= List of WTO dispute settlement cases =

This is a chronological list of World Trade Organization dispute settlement cases. As of September 2026, there have been 646 such cases.

== List ==
DS#	Respondent	Title	Complainant
18	Australia	Measures Affecting Importation of Salmon	Canada
28	Japan	Measures Concerning Sound Recordings	United States
42	Japan	Measures Concerning Sound Recordings	European Communities
46	Brazil	Export Financing Programme for Aircraft	Canada
58	United States	Import Prohibition of Certain Shrimp and Shrimp Products	India; Malaysia; Pakistan; Thailand
70	Canada	Measures Affecting the Export of Civilian Aircraft	Brazil
71	Canada	Measures Affecting the Export of Civilian Aircraft	Brazil
121	Argentina	Safeguard Measures on Imports of Footwear	European Communities
123	Argentina	Safeguard Measures on Imports of Footwear	Indonesia
160	United States	Section 110(5) of US Copyright Act	European Communities
164	Argentina	Measures Affecting Imports of Footwear	United States
222	Canada	Export Credits and Loan Guarantees for Regional Aircraft	Brazil
257	United States	Final Countervailing Duty Determination with respect to certain Softwood Lumber from Canada	Canada
264	United States	Final Dumping Determination on Softwood Lumber from Canada	Canada
267	United States	Subsidies on Upland Cotton	Brazil
312	South Korea	Anti-Dumping Duties on Imports of Certain Paper from Indonesia	Indonesia
344	United States	Final Anti-Dumping Measures on Stainless Steel from Mexico	Mexico
376	European Communities	Tariff Treatment of Certain Information Technology Products	Japan
381	United States	Measures Concerning the Importation, Marketing and Sale of Tuna and Tuna Products	Mexico
401	European Communities	Measures Prohibiting the Importation and Marketing of Seal Products	Norway
431	China	Measures Related to the Exportation of Rare Earths, Tungsten and Molybdenum	United States
439	South Africa	Anti-Dumping Duties on Frozen Meat of Fowls from Brazil	Brazil
448	United States	Measures Affecting the Importation of Fresh Lemons	Argentina
459	European Union	Certain Measures on the Importation and Marketing of Biodiesel and Measures Supporting the Biodiesel Industry	Argentina
464	United States	Anti-dumping and Countervailing Measures on large residential washers from Korea	Republic of Korea
480	European Union	Anti-Dumping Measures on Biodiesel from Indonesia	Indonesia
