= Brazil–United States cotton dispute =

Brazil v. United States
- Court: WTO Appellate Body
- Full case name: United States — Subsidies on Upland Cotton
- Argued: March 18 2003
- Decided: March 3, 2005
- Citation: DS267

Holding
- U.S. support for its cotton industry was inconsistent with its obligations under the SCM Agreement.

Laws applied
- SCM Agreement

The Brazil–United States cotton dispute was a World Trade Organization dispute settlement case (DS267) on the issue of unfair subsidies on cotton. In 2002, Brazil—a major cotton export competitor—expressed its growing concerns about United States cotton subsidies by initiating a WTO dispute settlement case (DS267) against certain features of the U.S. cotton program. On March 18, 2003, a Panel was established to adjudicate the dispute. Argentina, Canada, China, Taiwan, the European Communities, India, Pakistan, and Venezuela participated as third parties. Focusing on six specific claims relating to US payment programmes, Brazil argued that the US had failed to abide by its commitments in the Uruguay Round Agreement on Agriculture (AoA) and the Agreement on Subsidies and Countervailing Measures (SCM). On September 8, 2004, a WTO dispute settlement (DS) panel ruled against the United States on several key issues in case.

The United States is the second-largest producer and world’s largest exporter of cotton. In recent years, the United States has been exporting an increasing share of its annual production, due in large part to a decline in domestic mill use.

On August 31, 2009, after a series of recourses by both United States and Brazil, WTO issued a decision on the dispute DS267.

The implications of the ruling are that it shows that the US and European Union have used loopholes and creative accounting to continue dumping products on developing markets, hurting impoverished developing country farmers. The WTO dispute settlement panel also found that the USA misreported certain programmes as ‘non trade-distorting’, when in fact they were trade-distorting.

In October 2014, a mutually acceptable solution to the cotton dispute was reached just before Brazil was set to raise tariffs on hundreds of millions of dollars in American goods. This included cars, electronics, and pharmaceuticals. Under the terms of the agreement, the US granted a one-off payment of US$300 million to the Brazilian Cotton Institute.

== Implications for African countries ==
The International Cotton Advisory Committee (ICAC) estimates that subsidies reduce cotton prices by 10% and the World Bank estimates this number at 12.9%. This amounts to an annual revenue loss of $147 million to African countries. Oxfam estimates that the removal of U.S. cotton subsidies alone would increase prices 6-14% and thus increase the average household income in West Africa 2-9%-- enough to support food expenditure for 1 million people.

According to the ICAC, even though the United States may be the leading exporter of cotton, the cost of production is significantly higher than that of other countries. The average cost of production of a pound of cotton is $0.80 per pound in comparison to $0.35 in the West African country of Benin.

According to agricultural economics at the University of California, Davis, the removal of American subsidies would cause a permanent upward shift of the price of cotton. As a result, prices would fluctuate around a higher average price. Furthermore, farm prices are usually set prior to the marketing season each year, which means that farmers do not always feel the full volatility of the price fluctuations.

However, cotton subsidies in industrialized countries is not the only reason for the falling cotton prices over the past 50 years. Technological advancement and competition from synthetic fibers (such as nylon).

A study, commissioned by ICTSD and conducted by Mario Jales of Cornell University, suggests that cotton prices would have risen over a 1998-2007 base period if the US had cut subsidies that were deemed unlawful by a dispute panel at the WTO, following complaints by Brazil.

Farmers in poor countries could have gained from an average 6 percent increase in world cotton prices over the same base period, if the U.S. had accepted proposals made by African nations to slash the subsidies provided to producers in richer countries.

Cotton production in the United States could have declined by as much as 15 percent, the study suggests, if African proposals in the draft Doha accord were applied to historical output levels over the ten-year period examined by the study, and production in the EU could drop by as much as 30 percent. However, production volumes could increase by as much as 3-3.5 percent in Brazil, Central Asia and West Africa - with production values growing by up to 13 percent.

Similarly, if African proposals that are included in the Doha draft were applied to trade flows over the ten-year period that the study examines, U.S. export volumes would have fallen by 16 percent on average. Average export volumes would have increased dramatically for Brazil and India (12-14 percent), and by a lower but still substantial amount in Uzbekistan, the ‘C-4′ West African cotton producing countries (Benin, Burkina Faso, Chad and Mali), and Australia (2-2.5 percent).

== Resulting Legislation ==
Under a 2015 version of the U.S. farm bill, cotton would have the lowest subsidies of all U.S. field crops when it used to have the highest. The Senate and House versions of this bill will eliminate multiple aspects of U.S. cotton subsidies, including direct-payments to farmers counter-cyclical payments. The intention of both of these policies is to increase farmers' income when the price of cotton drops.

However, U.S. cotton farmers will still be protected to an extent. The House and Senate bills include the Stacked Income Protection Program (STAX), which serves as a form of income protection for the farmers.

STAX guarantees cotton farmers that they will receive between 70% and 90% of the expected revenue for their area which is determined by the United States Department of Agriculture (USDA). Federal subsidies cover 80% of the premiums for this insurance program. According to the Congressional Budget Office, the estimated cost of this program is $3.29 billion. The farm bill contains no limit to the payout that any individual cotton farmer can receive under the STAX program.

Brazil also agreed to not motion new WTO retaliatory sanctions against U.S. cotton programs while the current farm bill is in action or “against agricultural export guarantees.”

== Brazilian cotton industry ==
Brazil is the fifth largest cotton producer in the world.

According to the latest information from USDA, Brazil is the fifth largest cotton producing country and the third largest exporter in the world. Cotton prices have continued to decline - not due to changes in U.S. cotton policy (which is no longer considered a program crop under the 2014 Farm Bill) but rather due to Chinese cotton policy.

Today U.S. cotton producers rely only on insurance products (STAX Program) after having eliminated all Farm Bill support mechanisms

== See also ==
- List of WTO dispute settlement cases
- Cotton production in the United States
