= Beef hormone controversy =

Agricultural trade controversy

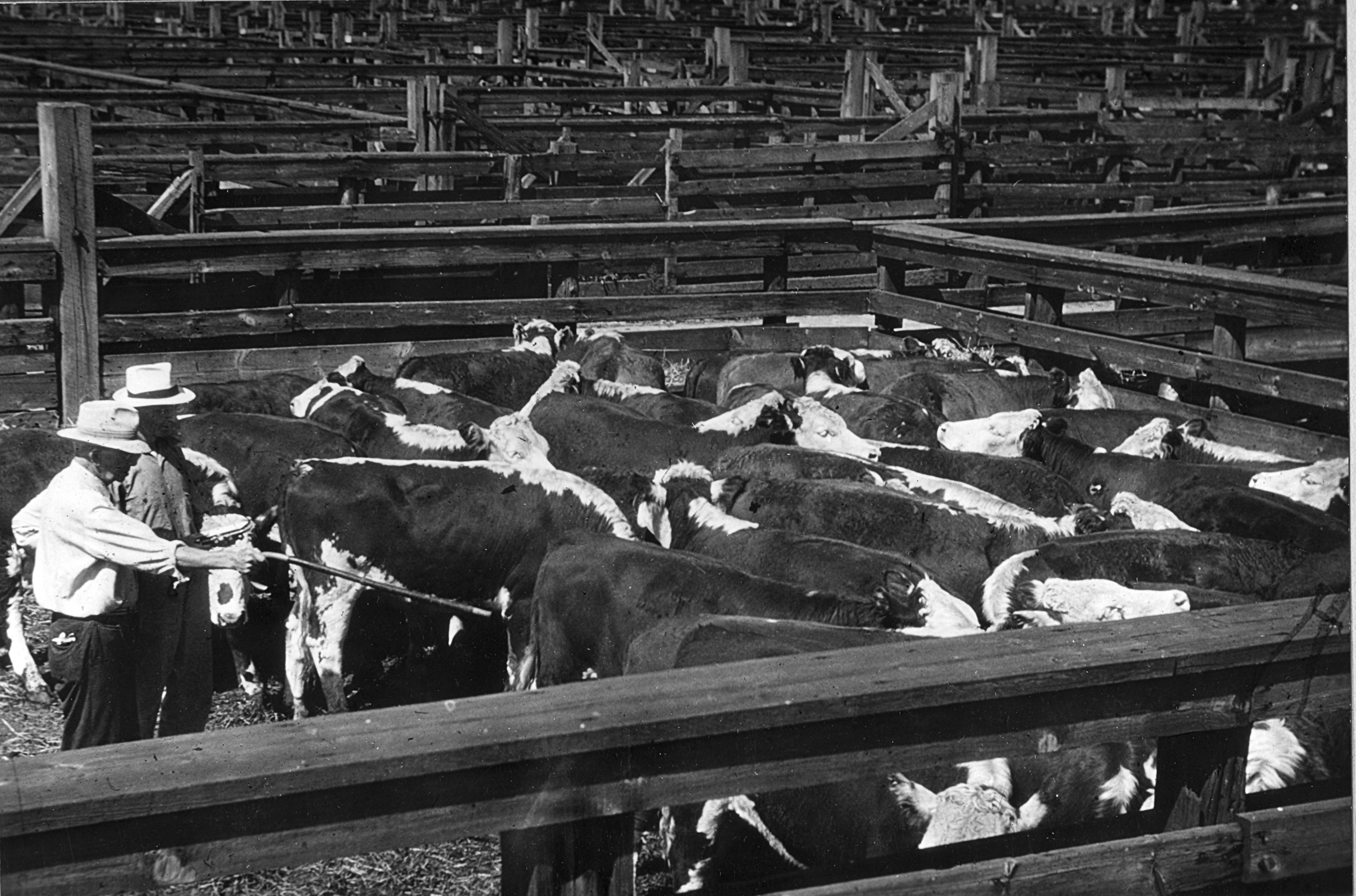
Agricultural Marketing Service (AMS) reporter views cattle for a livestock report in 1941

The beef hormone controversy or beef hormone dispute is a disagreement over the use of growth hormones in beef production.

In 1989, the European Communities banned the import of meat that contained artificial beef growth hormones, (Note: By the time of the EU ban (1989), all animal growth-promoting hormones allowed in the US were sex hormones (steroids and analogues that target the same receptor) as opposed to growth hormone, the specific peptide hormone produced in the brain. In 1993, the US Food and Drug Administration (FDA) approved the use of bovine somatotropin, which is a true growth hormone.) although they were approved for use in the United States. In 2003 estradiol-17β was permanently banned, while provisionally banning five others. World Trade Organization (WTO) rules permit such bans, but only where a signatory presents valid scientific evidence that the ban is a health and safety measure. Canada and the United States opposed this ban, taking the EU to the WTO Dispute Settlement Body. In 1997, the WTO Dispute Settlement Body ruled against the EU.

It remains one of the most intractable agricultural trade controversies since the establishment of the WTO. It is not the same as the UK–EU dispute over bovine spongiform encephalopathy, although both have been termed the "beef war".

== History ==
=== EU ban ===
The EU banned estradiol, progesterone, testosterone, zeranol, melengestrol acetate and trenbolone acetate. The first three are synthetic versions of endogenous hormones that are naturally produced in humans and animals, and in a wide range of foods, whereas the last two are synthetic, designed to mimic the behaviour of endogenous hormones. Zeranol (alpha-zearalanol) is produced semi-synthetically, but occurs naturally in some foods. It is one of several derivatives of zearalenone produced by certain Fusarium. Although its occurrence in animal products can be partly due to ingestion of such feeds, alpha-zearalanol can be produced endogenously in ruminants that have ingested zearalenone and some zearalenone derivatives. The EU did not impose an absolute ban. Under veterinary supervision, cattle farmers were permitted to administer the synthetic versions of natural hormones for cost-reduction and possibly therapeutic purposes, such as synchronising oestrus cycles. All six hormones were licensed for use in the US and in Canada.

Under the Agreement on the Application of Sanitary and Phytosanitary Measures, signatories have the right to impose restrictions on health and safety grounds subject to scientific analysis. The heart of the dispute was the fact that risk analysis is statistical, and thus unable to determine with absolute certainty the absence of health risks. While US and Canada beef producers claimed that beef produced with the use of hormones was safe, the EU asserted that it was not safe.

Hormones in cattle had been studied in North America for 50 years prior to the ban, accompanied by long-term use in over 20 countries. Canada and the United States asserted that these practices provided empirical evidence of long-term safety.

The EU had already established other measures that restricted the import of North American beef. The primary North American product affected by the new ban was edible offal.

A series of "hormone scandals" emerged in Italy in the late 1970s and early 1980s. The first, in 1977, was the discovery of premature puberty in northern Italian schoolchildren. Investigators cast suspicion on school lunches that used illegal hormone-treated meat. No concrete evidence was found–no samples of the suspect meals were available for analysis. In 1980 diethylstilbestrol (DES), another illegal synthetic hormone, was discovered in veal-based baby foods.

Little or no scientific evidence supported these restrictions. However, consumer groups successfully influenced the European Parliament to enact regulations in the 1980s, and influenced public perceptions. In the US at the time, consumer organizations evinced little interest prior to the 1980s, and regulations were driven by a coalition of export-oriented industry and farming interests, opposed only by organic farming groups.

Until 1980, the use of growth hormones was completely prohibited in Italy, Denmark, the Netherlands, and Greece. Germany, the EU's largest beef producer at the time, prohibited only exogenous growth hormones. The five other countries, including the second and third largest beef producers, France and the United Kingdom, respectively, permitted their use. This had resulted in disputes, with countries that had no prohibitions arguing that the restrictions by the others acted as non-tariff trade barriers. In response to the public outcry, in combination with the discovery that DES was a teratogen, in 1980 the EU began to issue regulations, beginning with prohibiting the use of stilbenes and thyrostatics by the European Community Council of Agriculture Ministers in 1980, and commissioning of a scientific study into the use of estradiol, testosterone, progesterone, trenbolone, and zeranol in 1981.

The European Consumers' Organisation (BEUC) lobbied for a total ban upon growth hormones, opposed, with partial success, by the pharmaceutical industry. (In 1987 the European Federation of Animal Health (FEDESA), formed to represent, amongst other things, companies that manufactured growth hormones.) Neither European farmers nor the meat processing industry took a stance on the matter. With the help of the BEUC consumer boycotts of veal products, sparked by the Italian scandals and similar reports in France and Germany, spread across the EU, causing companies such as Hipp and Alete to withdraw their veal products, while veal prices dropped in France, Belgium, West Germany, Ireland, and the Netherlands. Because of the fixed purchases guaranteed by the EU's Common Agricultural Policy, ECU 10 million came out of the EU budget.

The imposition of a general ban was encouraged by the European Parliament. A 1981 resolution passed by 177:1. The Council of Ministers was divided along lines that matched each country's domestic stance on growth hormones, with France, Ireland, the U.K., Belgium, Luxembourg, and Germany all opposing a general ban. The European Commission, leery of a Council veto and linked to both pharmaceutical and (via Directorate VI) agricultural interests, presented factual arguments and emphasized the problem of trade barriers.

=== 1998 WTO decision ===
The WTO Appellate Body affirmed the WTO Panel conclusion in a report adopted by the WTO Dispute Settlement Body on 13 February 1998. Section 208 of this report says:

[W]e find that the European Communities did not actually proceed to an assessment, within the meaning of Articles 5.1 and 5.2, of the risks arising from the failure of observance of good veterinary practice combined with problems of control of the use of hormones for growth promotion purposes. The absence of such risk assessment, when considered in conjunction with the conclusion actually reached by most, if not all, of the scientific studies relating to the other aspects of risk noted earlier, leads us to the conclusion that no risk assessment that reasonably supports or warrants the import prohibition embodied in the EC Directives was furnished to the Panel. We affirm, therefore, the ultimate conclusions of the Panel that the EC import prohibition is not based on a risk assessment within the meaning of Articles 5.1 and 5.2 of the SPS Agreement and is, therefore, inconsistent with the requirements of Article 5.1.

On 12 July 1999, an arbitrator appointed by the WTO Dispute Settlement Body authorized the US to impose retaliatory tariffs of US$116.8 million per year on the EU.

=== EU risk assessments ===
In 2002 the EU Scientific Committee on Veterinary Measures relating to Public Health (SCVPH) claimed that the use of beef growth hormones posed a potential health risk, and in 2003 the EU enacted Directive 2003/74/EC to amend its ban, but the US and Canada objected that the EU had not met WTO standards for scientific risk assessment.

The EC claimed that the hormones remain in the tissue, specifically 17-beta estradiol. However, the EC found no clear link to health risks in humans for the other five hormones. The EC reported that high amounts of hormones had been found in areas around dense cattle lots. This increase in hormones in groundwater affected waterways and nearby wild fish. Hormone contamination of North American waterways would not, however, have any health impacts on European consumers.

=== 2008 WTO decision ===
In November 2004, the EU requested WTO consultations, claiming that the United States should remove its retaliatory measures since the EU had removed the measures found to be WTO-inconsistent in the original case. In 2005, the EU initiated new WTO dispute settlement proceedings against the US and Canada, and a March 2008 panel report cited fault with all three parties (EU, United States, and Canada) on various substantive and procedural matters. In October 2008, the WTO Appellate Body issued a mixed ruling that allows continued imposition of trade sanctions on the EU by the United States and Canada, but also allowed the EU to continue its import ban.

In November 2008, the EU filed a new WTO challenge following the announcement by the USTR that it was seeking comment on possible modification of the list of EU products subject to increased tariffs, and in January 2009 the USTR announced changes to the list of EU products subject to increased tariffs. In September 2009, the United States and the European Commission signed a memorandum of understanding, which established a new EU duty-free import quota for grain-fed, high quality beef (HQB) as part of a compromise solution. However, in December 2016, the US took steps to reinstate retaliatory tariffs given continued concerns about EU market access, and in August 2019 they agreed to establish an initial duty-free tariff-rate quota of 18,500 tonnes annually, growing in phases over seven years to 35,000 tonnes (valued at approximately US$420 million) of the EU 45,000 tonnes quota of non-hormone treated beef.

== Effects upon EU policy ==
The EU often applies the precautionary principle very stringently in regards to food safety. The precautionary principle means that in a case of scientific uncertainty, the government may take appropriate measures proportionate to the potential risk (EC Regulation 178/2002). In 1996, the EU banned imported beef from the US and continued to do so after the 2003 Mad Cow scare. A more sophisticated risk assessment found there to be insufficient risk to ban certain hormones, but continued to ban others. Labeling of meat was another option, however warnings were also insufficient because of the criteria specified in the SPS (Sanitary and Phyto-Sanitary agreement). This agreement allows members to use scientifically based measures to protect public health. Most specifically the Equivalence provision in Article 4 which states the following: "an importing country must accept an SPS measure which differs from its own as equivalent if the exporting country’s measure provides the same level of health or environmental protection." Therefore, although the EU is a strong proponent of labels and banning meat that contains growth hormones, requiring the US to do the same would have violated this agreement.

== Effects upon US public opinion ==
One effect of the dispute in the US was to awaken the public's interest in the issue. This interest was not wholly unsympathetic to the EU. In 1989, for example, the Consumer Federation of America and the Center for Science in the Public Interest both pressed for an adoption of a ban within the US similar to that within the EU. In a study done in 2002, 85% of respondents wanted mandatory labeling on beef produced with growth hormones.

== See also ==
- Organic food
- Genetically modified food controversies
- JECFA
- Genetically modified organisms
- Dispute settlement in the WTO
- Pink slime
- The World According to Monsanto - a documentary about Monsanto's corporate practices
