= EC-IT product dispute =

European Communities and its Member States — Tariff Treatment of Certain Information Technology Products, also known by its short title EC - IT Products or its case number DS376, is a WTO dispute initiated by Japan against the European Communities and its member states. The dispute was initiated on 28 September 2008 and was settled on 16 August 2010, with the Dispute Settlement Body recognising violations by the European Communities.

== Products at issue ==
Products at issue in the Japan - European Union dispute were IT products such as FDPs (Flat panel display devices), that have digital DVI connectors used for connecting to computers and other equipment; STBCs (set-top boxes) which have a communication function of accessing Internet and recording; and MFMs (multifunctional digital machines), used for scanning, printing, copying, and faxing.

== History ==
The dispute was initiated by Japan, when it requested consultation with European Communities on September 28, 2008. Issue at hand was tariff treatment of certain information technology products. Japan claimed that tariff treatment was violating commitments of European Union to Information Technology Agreement of WTO. According to Japan, instead of duty-free tariff concessions (provided by ITA), European Union and its member states were imposing duties on certain Japanese technologies. On August 18, 2008, Japan, along with United States and Chinese Taipei jointly requested establishment of a panel. On 21 July 2009, the Chairman of the panel informed the Dispute Settlement Body (DSB) that due to complex nature of issue, panel would not be able to complete work in six months from the date of the creation of panel. It was estimated that the panel would issue final report in December 2009, but issuance was postponed several times, with final issuance date of July 2010. On August 16, 2010 panel was concluded and reports were circulated to Members.

== WTO findings and ruling ==
European Communities have committed to provide duty-free treatment of certain IT products in Information Technology Agreement (ITA). Panel found that measures at issue (tariffs) were not consistent with following Articles: Art. II:1(a) and II:1(b) of General Agreement on Tariffs and Trade of 1994. The articles require classification of certain FDPs, STBCs and MFMs under dutiable headings although these products fell under HS1996 subheadings which are supposed to be duty-free. Panel concluded that European Communities failed prompt publishing of explanatory notes to enable governments and traders to become acquainted with them. The Panel also found that the European Communities violated Art. X:2 by enforcing the explanatory notes before they were published officially.

== After WTO ruling ==
On October 25, 2010, the European Union informed Dispute Settlement Body that it intended to implement recommendations and rulings of the panel. It requested a reasonable period of time. Japan and European Union informed Dispute Settlement Body that the stated time period would be nine months and nine days (ending on 20 June 2011). On 20 July 2011, the European Union stated that it had adopted all measures necessary to follow DSB's rulings in June, although Japan said that it had several concerns about certain measures taken by European union and was not yet in a position to agree to the European Union's claim. In order to come to resolution and reduce scope of procedural disputes, Japan and the European Union had concluded a sequencing agreement.

== See also ==
- List of WTO dispute settlement cases
