= Antidumping case about washing machines =

2013–2019 WTO dispute

On August 29, 2013, an antidumping case involving South Korea began at the World Trade Organization over U.S. tariffs imposed on imported washing machines. South Korea exports around US$800 million–1 billion worth of washing machines to the United States per year. The machines are made in Mexico and South Korea. South Korea was notified by the WTO for consultations with the United States on anti-dumping and countervailing measures on South Korean "residential washers" by the US Department of Commerce. The case was brought by Whirlpool Corporation, one of the world's biggest appliance makers.

Whirlpool produces large residential washers in the United States under the Whirlpool, Maytag, Roper, Estate, Admiral, Amana, and Crosley brands.

The antidumping investigation came in response to a petition filed in December 2011 by Whirlpool Corporation, claiming washing machines imported from South Korea and Mexico were being sold at prices below fair market value. Whirlpool filed several complaints against imports from South Korea and Mexico.

== Dispute and results ==
The U.S International Trade Commission ruled 6–0 in favor of Whirlpool, finding that the U.S. washing machine industry was threatened by imports of residential washers from South Korea. Also, the commission stated South Korean producers, Daewoo, LG, and Samsung were dumping washing machines far below their market value. Investigation into the matter led to the finding that LG and Samsung's market sales in the United States were found significantly different and the differences were not taken into account using the average-to-average method. A countervailing duty of over 72 percent was set for Daewoo, while the two other South Korean companies were given much smaller duties of below two percent. LG Electronics Inc. faced a dumping margin of 13.02, while Samsung Electronics Co. Ltd. received a 9.29 percent dumping duty rate. Both LG and Samsung have since challenged Commerce's findings in the U.S. Court of International Trade, using the argument that the ITC improperly used the zeroing method to calculate dumping margins.

Consultations between South Korea and the United States were requested concerning the anti-dumping and countervailing issues on August 29, 2013. LG and Samsung objected to the analysis, Whirlpool's dumping allegations in the preliminary determination of the case, the Nails test, and also the use of weighting-average net prices in conducting the targeted dumping analysis. LG and Samsung also objected to the gap test used to detect the weighted-average sales in a target and non-target group. The WTO said South Korea has taken issue with the U.S. Department of Commerce's use of zeroing, a controversial method for calculating anti-dumping duties that has been the subject of other WTO cases against the U.S. Zeroing is a way of calculating anti-dumping duties that does not provide offsets for instances of "negative dumping" — that is, when an imported product is sold in the U.S. at prices equal to or higher than in its home country — in determining a dumping margin.

South Korea claims that the measures identified in its request for consultations are inconsistent with:

- Articles 1, 2.1, 2.4, 2.4.2, 5.8, 9.3, 9.4, 9.5, 11 and 18.4 of the Anti-Dumping Agreement
- Articles 1.1, 1.2, 2.1, 2.2, 10, 14 and 19.4 of the Subsidies and Countervailing Measures (SCM) Agreement
- Articles VI, VI:1, VI:2 and VI:3 of the GATT 1994
- Article XVI:4 of the WTO Agreement

In September 2013, China and Japan requested to join the consultations. In December 2013 South Korea requested the creation of a panel – this was deferred by the Dispute Settlement Body until January 22, 2014, when a panel that consisted of Brazil, Canada, China, the European Union, India, Japan, Norway, Thailand, and Turkey was formed.

On 10 June 2014, South Korea requested the Director-General to compose the panel. He composed the panel on 20 June 2014.

On 15 December 2014, the chair of the panel informed the Dispute Settlement Body (DSB) that the beginning of the panel's work was delayed due to a lack of available experienced lawyers in the Secretariat. The panel expects to issue its final report to the parties by the end of 2015.

In 2016, Korea won the case against US. WTO awarded South Korea $85 million against it.

== See also ==
- List of WTO dispute settlement cases
- Dumping (pricing policy)
