= Rare earths trade dispute =

2012–2014 World Trade Organization Case

The rare earths trade dispute, between China on one side and several countries (with the U.S. being the primary leader) on the other, was over China's export restrictions on rare earth elements as well as tungsten and molybdenum. Rare earth metals are used to make powerful neodymium, praseodymium, dysprosium and terbium magnets, defense products and many electronics.

The US, EU and Japan argued that the restrictions were a violation of the World Trade Organization (WTO) trade regulations, while China stated that the restrictions are aimed at resource conservation and environmental protection. In 2012, the Obama administration filed a case with the Dispute Settlement Body of the WTO. In 2014, the WTO ruled against China, which led China to drop the export quotas in 2015.

The 2010 episode generated increased investment in rare earth developments outside China.

== Products at issue ==
There are 17 rare-earth metals, and their production is a complex multi-stage process. Exports may be in the form of ores or goods at any stage, including mined rare-earth ores (all containing a minuscule amount of mixed rare earths), refined ore concentrates, refined highly pure metals, or products incorporating refined metals (car lithium batteries, magnets or magnet-incorporating windmill generators).

Known reserves of rare-earth ores are 120 million tonnes, with China possessing about one-third of these.

The first stage, the mining process, yields rare-earth ores. More than 60% of rare-earth metals (as of 2019) are mined by China and through controlled entities predominantly in Africa. The second stage is the refining process, when ores are separated into some pure metals and some concentrates of light rare earths or heavy rare-earth metals. The refining process is highly specific to the nature of the ore and target metals, with concentrates produced for other refineries to conduct further refining. China produces 85% of the global market share of anodes and also has a large share in the processing of the materials. It refines 68% of nickel globally, 40% of copper, 59% of lithium, and 73% of cobalt.

Production of parts and goods is another industrial process performed by many different companies. China produces a large share of these goods and accounts for the majority of the world's exports, especially lithium-ion batteries and neodymium magnets. It accounts for most of the global production of mineral-rich components for battery cells, including 70% of cathodes, 85% of anodes, 66% of separators, and 62% of electrolytes China holds 78% of the world's cell manufacturing capacity for electric vehicle batteries, which are then assembled into modules used to form a battery pack. China also hosts roughly 75% of the world's lithium-ion battery megafactories. This makes China the largest consumer of the minerals it refines.

The rare-earth elements (or rare earths) are 17 elements that have magnetic and conductive properties. They are used extensively in electronic products such as cellphones, and also in national defense equipment. Despite their name, the elements are not so "rare"; they can be found widely. They are not often found in economically exploitable concentrations, however, and their mining is environmentally hazardous. The rare earths were discovered and first put to industrial use in the United States, but in the 1990s, technology transferred from the US and Japan, lower labor costs, and less strict environmental regulations enabled China to become the world's main supplier of rare earths.

== History of the dispute ==
=== Early restrictions ===
In the 2000s, China began to restrict the rare earths industry out of a desire to control foreign investment in strategic industries, and exports of rare earths decreased. Because China was the world's biggest supplier of rare earths at the time it instituted export restrictions in the 2000s, its policies resulted in major disruption to global supply and significant price increases.

China was accused of unofficially banning of rare earths exports to Japan during a diplomatic standoff between the two countries after the 2010 Senkaku boat collision incident, though China denies such reports. Critics pointed at this incident to argue that China was not above using its dominance in rare earths production to gain leverage in international negotiations. In 2011, Japanese organizations invested in Lynas to support rare-earth mining and ore processing in Western Australia and rare-earth separation in Malaysia, an alternative supply chain that helped reduce Japan's reliance on China rare-earth imports from roughly 90 percent in 2010 to 60 to 70 percent by late 2025.

=== The WTO case ===
In 2012, the US brought a case to WTO's Dispute Settlement Body against the Chinese restrictions. The European Union and Japan also joined the case on the US side. The US argued that the Chinese restrictions were in breach of the accession treaty that China had signed when it joined the WTO in 2001. The treaty disallowed export duties and quotas, except for goods specifically listed. Rare earths were not among the goods specifically listed.

China argued that its restrictions were legal because WTO regulations allow countries to impose export duties and quotas for reasons of conservation and to protect plant, animal, and human safety.

In 2014, the WTO ruled against China, determining that its export controls were not justifiable according to the exceptions that China had contended.

==== Response to the WTO ruling ====
China expressed disappointment with the ruling (NYT) and filed an appeal repeating its conservation argument. The Appellate panel of the WTO, however, upheld the ruling. The US Trade Representative hailed the ruling as a victory for openness and fairness around the world. China dropped its export restrictions in January 2015.

China complied with the ruling, which also prompted increased policy coordination by central ministries and provided the impetus for further domestic reform.

In March 2015, the American news program 60 Minutes broadcast a segment in which the news anchor said that, due to the ubiquity of the use of the rare earths, especially in weaponry, the Chinese restrictions posed a national security threat to the US.

As a result of the higher prices China charged outside of China prior to the WTO ruling, many rare earth mining companies in the U.S. and Europe were able to raise capital, and in some instances publicly, through stock sales. Chevron Mining spun off the Molycorp-owned Mountain Pass rare earth mine as a free-standing public company in 2008. However, in response to the WTO action and this growth in competition, China dropped the price of rare earths significantly, making these entities less attractive for investment and, in the case of Molycorp, unsustainable, forcing it into bankruptcy in June 2015. In June 2017, the Molycorp mine was sold out of bankruptcy at auction and was purchased by MP Mine Operations LLC, a company in which Shenghe Resources, a Chinese minority shareholder, is granted the exclusive right to market all rare earths from the mine.

=== Later restrictions ===
China placed export restrictions on rare earth elements on April 4, 2025 as part of its sweeping response to U.S. President Donald Trump's tariffs. Seven categories of medium and heavy rare earths, including samarium, gadolinium, terbium, dysprosium, lutetium, scandium and yttrium-related items, were placed on an export control list as of April 4, according to a China Ministry of Commerce release.

On October 9, 2025 Beijing unveiled sweeping new export controls on rare earths and related technologies. Mirroring Washington’s semiconductor export bans, which restricted foreign chipmakers from selling products to China if they were made with U.S. technology, China for the first time extended its export restrictions to producers outside China. Previous measures focused mainly on upstream raw materials but the new rules broadened to cover midstream and downstream manufacturing materials and technologies.

After a meeting in the South Korean city of Busan on October 30, 2025 between US President Donald Trump and CCP General Secretary Xi Jinping, China agreed to suspend a planned expansion of export controls on rare earth elements for a year as part of a broad trade deal. As part of that deal, Trump agreed to lower tariffs on Chinese goods from 57% to 47%.

In June 2026, China escalated the dispute further by adding ten US companies to its export control list, including MP Materials and USA Rare Earth, two companies backed by the US government to reduce reliance on Chinese rare earths. The move was announced on June 22, 2026 by China's Ministry of Commerce, described as a response to the United States expanding its own list of Chinese military-linked entities. On June 24, 2026, China's Ministry of Commerce published Announcement No. 26 of 2026, which formalizes a reporting mechanism for violations involving strategic mineral export controls, effective July 1, 2026.

In May 2026, two Japanese nationals employed by a major Japanese company were detained in Dalian on allegations of smuggling rare-earth-related items subject to export restrictions, representing one of the first publicly known cases of foreign nationals detained in China over such violations.

== In popular culture ==
The rare earths dispute formed part of the storyline in Season 2 of the Netflix series House of Cards (Real Clear World) and Call of Duty: Black Ops II.

From February to May 2015, the Thyssen Bornemisza Museum ran an art exhibition titled RARE EARTHS related to the dispute, featuring seventeen commissioned works, one for each element. Contemporary artists from The European Union, China, Mexico, Congo and Russia contributed works. Artist and political activist Ai Weiwei was among the artists who contributed.

== Maps ==
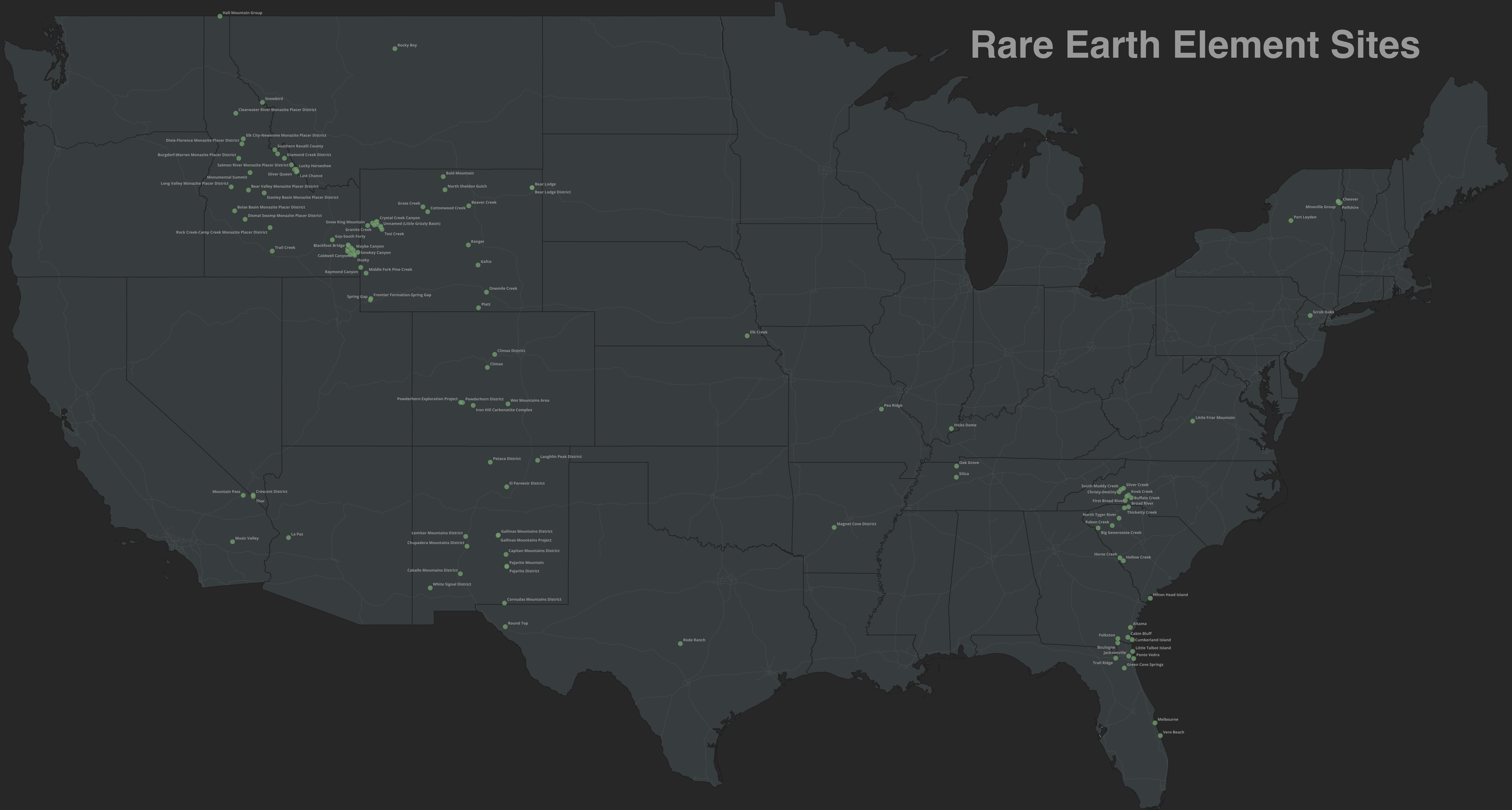
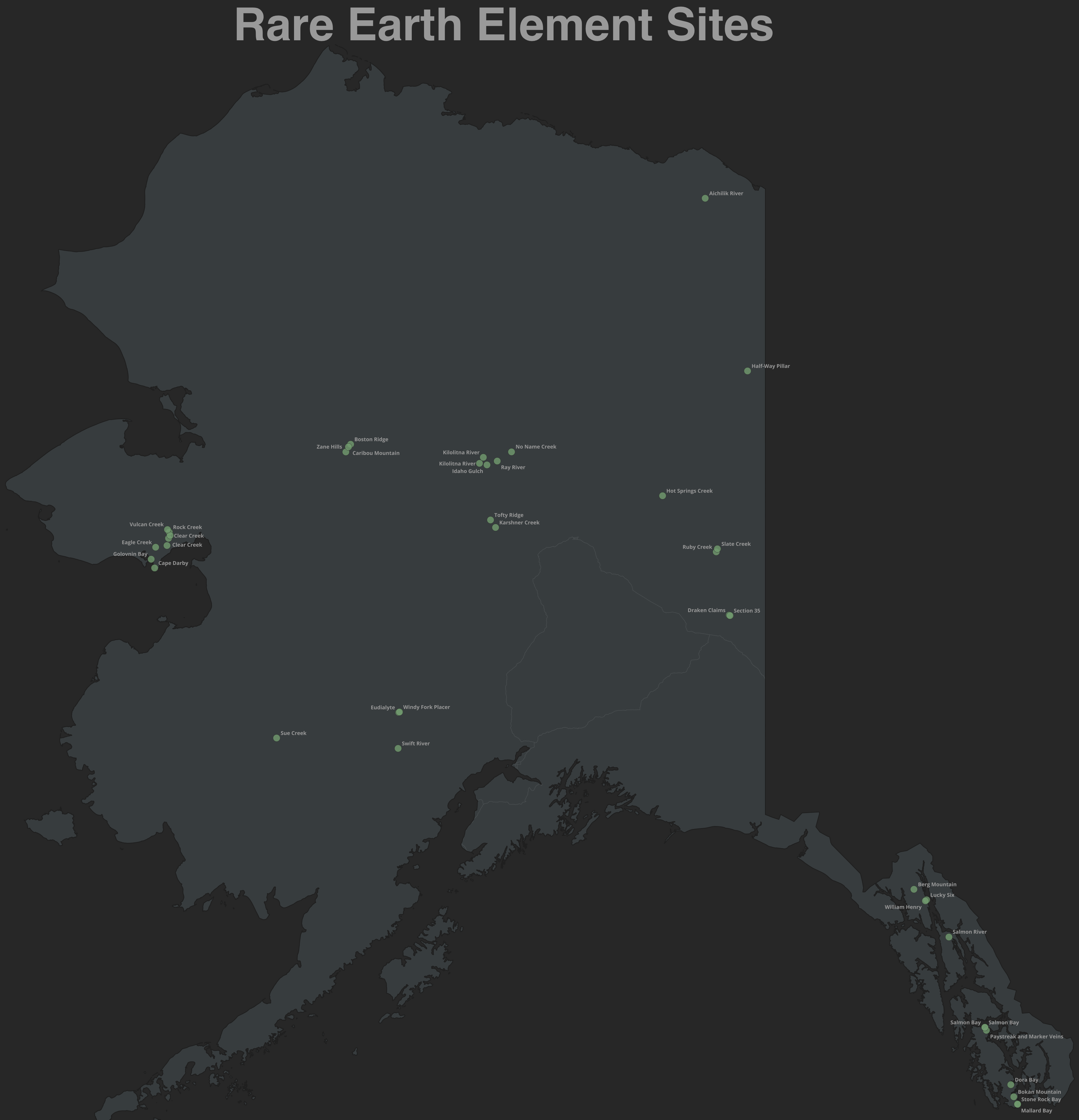
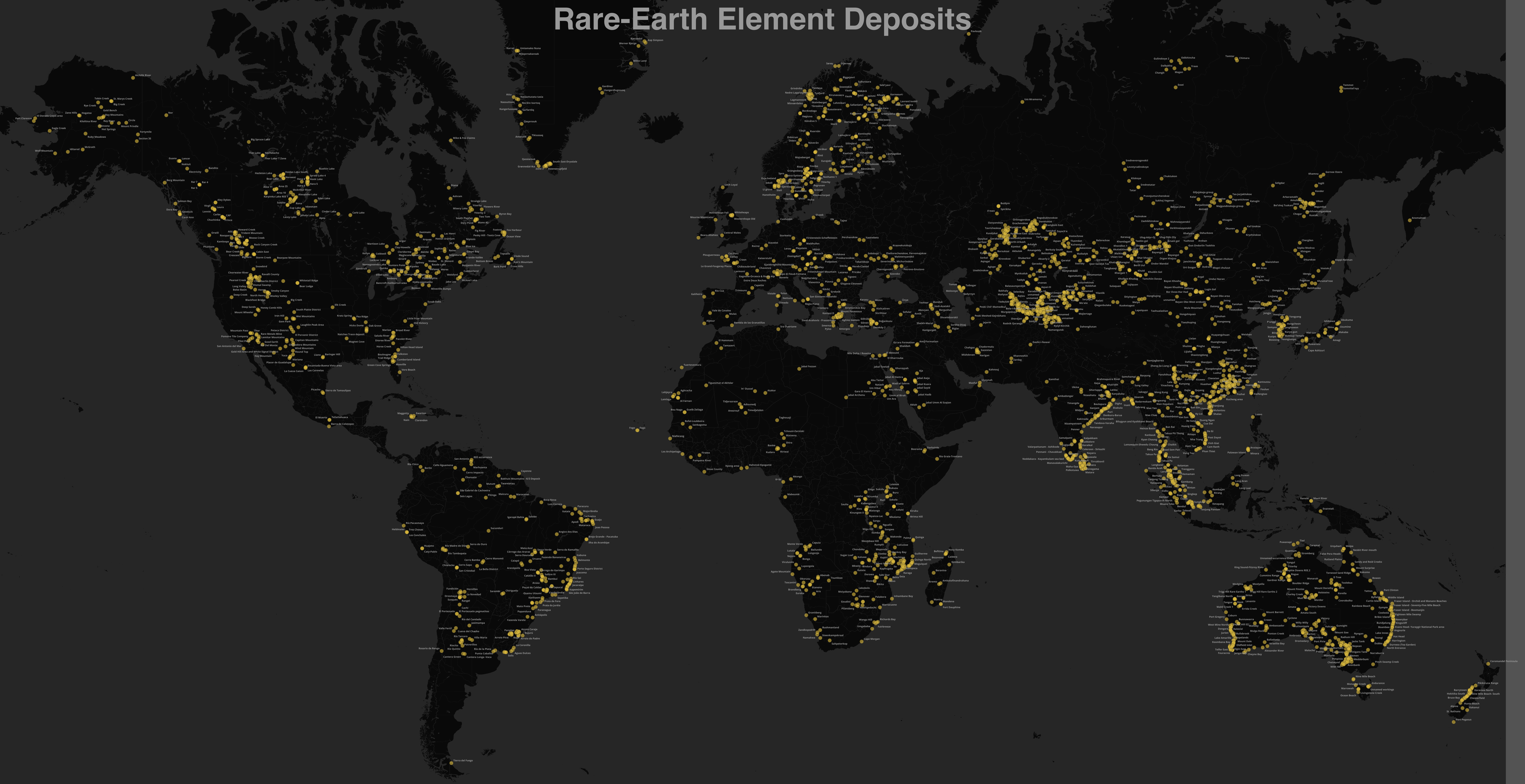
Rare-earth element deposit sites

== See also ==
- List of WTO dispute settlement cases
- United States Bureau of Mines
