= Japanese Sound Recording Trade Disputes =

In 1996, the European Community and United States filed complaints with the WTO against Japan concerning their distribution and protection of sound recordings that originated in their respective states. Both disputes accused Japan of violating numerous articles of the TRIPS Agreement. Both disputes were settled in December 1997, with the involved parties finding mutually agreeable solutions. DS28 was the first case ever brought to the WTO's dispute settlement body based on the TRIPS Agreement.

== DS28 ==
Since the 1980s, the Office of the United States Trade Representative had been monitoring Japan's distribution of American intellectual property and had been looking to retaliate against them under Section 301 of the Trade Act of 1974.

The United States first filed a request for consultation to the WTO's Dispute Settlement Body on February 14, 1996. The United States claimed that Japan, as a developed country, was not granting the United States most favoured nation status or criminally prosecuting piracy and requested a meeting for February 20, 1996.

Japan was accused of violating the following articles of the TRIPS Agreement:

- Article 3 – Members may not treat any member's good any less favorably than their own.
- Article 4 – All intellectual property has most favored nation status.
- Article 14 – Protection of performers or producers from the unauthorized reproduction or broadcast of their work
- Article 61 – The provision of criminal procedure to prevent the willful or commercial copying of intellectual property.
- Article 65 – Transitional rights for developing and developed nations.
- Article 70 – Protection of existing works.

On February 22, the European Community sent a communication to the involved parties requesting to join in the dispute against Japan, and claimed that there were over 100 million euro worth of pirated or otherwise illegally distributed Japanese recordings, including those of The Beatles, The Who, Eric Clapton, Leonard Bernstein, Berlin Philharmonic Orchestra and Vienna Philharmonic Orchestra in circulation in Japan. On February 29, Japan formally announced to the Dispute Settlement Body that they accepted the European Community's request to join the consultations with the United States.

== DS42 ==
On May 24, 1996, the European Community filed another request for consultation to the WTO's Dispute Settlement Body, under the pretense Japanese copyright law did not provide a sufficiently long period of protection for foreign producers and performers. Japanese copyright law offered protection to all foreign works produced after January 1, 1971. The European Community claimed that Japan should expand their protection to a fifty-year period, starting January 1, 1946 to comply with the WTO standards on intellectual property.

Japan was accused of violating Article 22.1 of the Uruguay Round of the GATT, as well as the following articles of the TRIPS Agreement:

- Article 14.6 – Protection of performers or producers from the unauthorized reproduction or broadcast of their work as per the Rome Convention and Berne Convention.
- Article 70.2 – Protection of existing works copyrighted under the Berne Convention.

On June 6, 1996, the United States requested to join these consultations, citing an estimated 500 million dollars' worth of forgone royalties on recordings from 1946 to 1971 in Japan. Their request to join case DS42 is noted as explicitly different concern from case DS28. Japan formally announced to the Dispute Settlement Body that they had accepted the United States' request to join consultations on June 13.

== Results ==
On February 5, 1997, the United States and Japan notified the Settlement Dispute Body that they had formally settled case DS28. In conclusion, it was agreed that under the TRIPS agreement, WTO members protected the rights of a recording from their country or could request to protect a work for at least fifty years after the end of the calendar year in which the recording was performed or fixed. Japan agreed to modify their copyright laws to fit these new parameters, effective March 1997. Charlene Barshefsky, the United States Trade Representative who negotiated the consultations, described the outcome as a victory for the protection and profitability of iconic American music: "We sought – and will now obtain – protection for U.S. sound recordings from one of the most vibrant and popular periods in the history of American music – from the swing music of Duke Ellington, the bebop jazz of John Coltrane, the rock and roll of Elvis Presley, Chuck Berry, Little Richard, Johnny Cash, Patsy Cline and the Sixties sounds of Bob Dylan, the Beach Boys and Otis Redding. The remarkable range and stature of the music produced in that quarter-century makes it an important part of our heritage."

Subsequently, on June 4, 1997, the European Community ended the dispute settlement proceedings for case DS42 after concluding the revisions made in response to DS28 had sufficiently solved the issues of protecting existing, copyrighted sound recordings.

== See also ==
- List of WTO dispute settlement cases
