= Dispute settlement in the World Trade Organization =

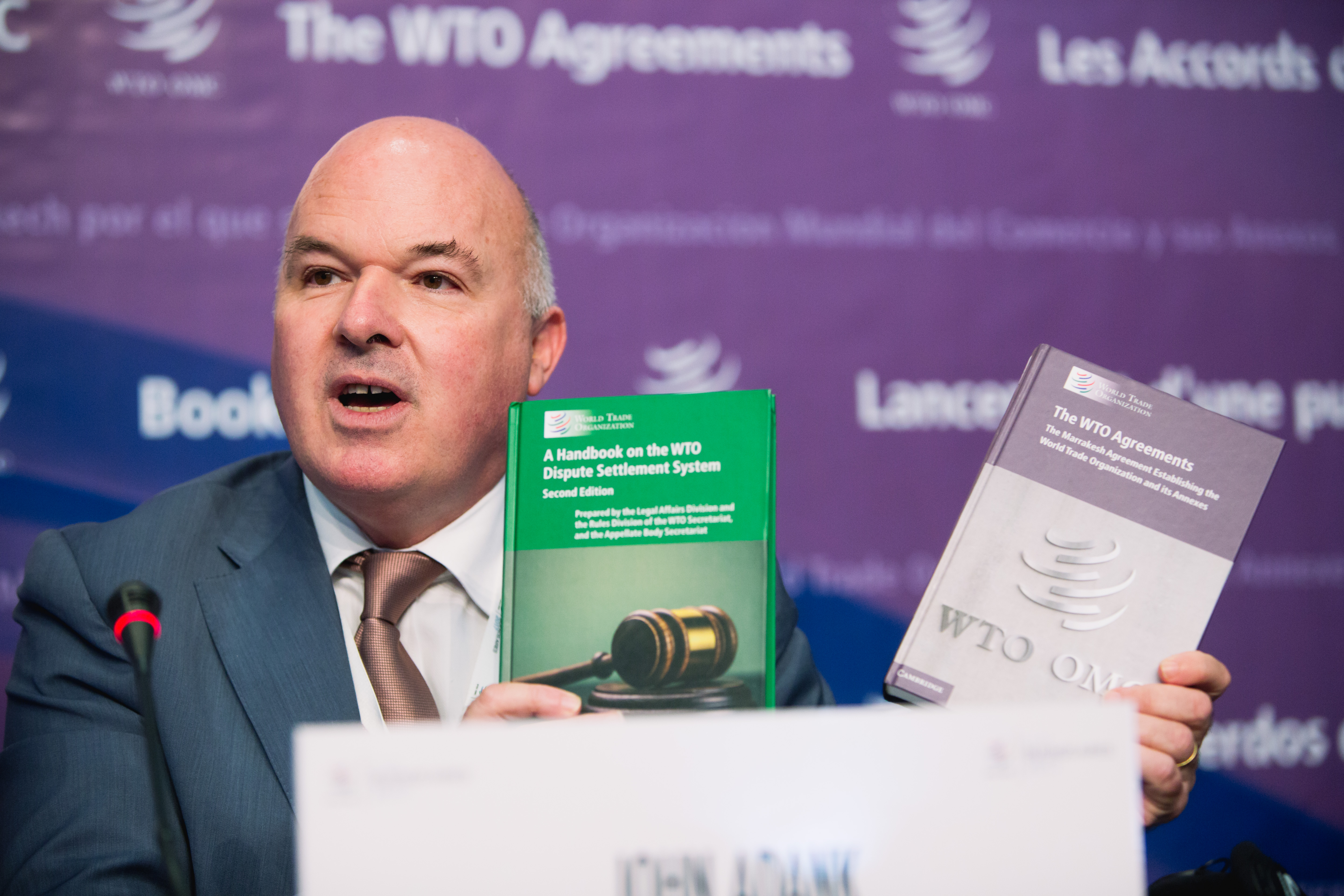
Guidance regarding trade disputes is found throughout many WTO publications.

Dispute settlement or dispute settlement system (DSS) is regarded by the World Trade Organization (WTO) as the central pillar of the multilateral trading system, and as the organization's "unique contribution to the stability of the global economy". A dispute arises when one member country adopts a trade policy measure or takes some action that one or more fellow members consider to be a breach of WTO agreements or to be a failure to live up to obligations. By joining the WTO, member countries have agreed that if they believe fellow members are in violation of trade rules, they will use the multilateral system of settling disputes instead of taking action unilaterally — this entails abiding by agreed procedures—Dispute Settlement Understanding—and respecting judgments, primarily of the Dispute Settlement Board (DSB), the WTO organ responsible for adjudication of disputes.

A former WTO Director-General characterized the WTO dispute settlement system as "the most active international adjudicative mechanism in the world today." Chad P. Bown of the Peterson Institute for International Economics and Petros Mavroidis of Columbia Law School remarked on the 20th anniversary of the dispute settlement system that the system is "going strong" and that "there is no sign of weakening". The dispute settlement mechanism in the WTO is one way in which trade is increased.

Since 2019, the WTO's dispute settlement mechanism has been de facto paralysed due to the United States vetoing all appointments of judges to the WTO's Appellate Body. Without a functioning Appellate Body, no final rulings can be made. This has since severely impacted the effectiveness of the WTO. This action has been criticised by many countries. As of 2022, a group of 127 countries had put forth 61 proposals to resume the appointment process, all of which were vetoed by the United States.

== Dispute Settlement Understanding ==
Prompt compliance with recommendations or rulings of the DSB is essential in order to ensure effective resolution of disputes to the benefit of all Members.

— World Trade Organization, Article 21.1 of the DSU

In 1994, the WTO members agreed on the Understanding on Rules and Procedures Governing the Settlement of Disputes or Dispute Settlement Understanding (DSU) (annexed to the "Final Act" signed in Marrakesh in 1994). Pursuant to the rules detailed in the DSU, member states can engage in consultations to resolve trade disputes pertaining to a "covered agreement" or, if unsuccessful, have a WTO panel hear the case. The priority, however, is to settle disputes, through consultations if possible. By January 2008, only about 136 of the nearly 369 cases had reached the full panel process.

Duration of a Dispute Settlement procedure
These approximate periods for each stage of a dispute settlement procedure are target figures The agreement is flexible. In addition, the countries can settle their dispute themselves at any stage. Totals are also approximate.
60 days	Consultations, mediation, etc.
45 days	Panel set up and panellists appointed
6 months	Final panel report to parties
3 weeks	Final panel report to WTO members
60 days	Dispute Settlement Body adopts report (if no appeal)
Total = 1 year (without appeal)
60–90 days	Appeals report
30 days	Dispute Settlement Body adopts appeals report
Total = 1 year 3 months (with appeal)
Source:Understanding the WTO: Settling Disputes - A unique contribution

The operation of the WTO dispute settlement process involves the parties and third parties to a case and may also involve the DSB panels, the Appellate Body, the WTO Secretariat, arbitrators, independent experts, and several specialized institutions. The General Council discharges its responsibilities under the DSU through the Dispute Settlement Body (DSB). Like the General Council, the DSB is composed of representatives of all WTO Members. The DSB is responsible for administering the DSU, i.e. for overseeing the entire dispute settlement process. It also has the authority to establish panels, adopt panel and Appellate Body reports, maintain surveillance of implementation of rulings and recommendations, and authorize the suspension of obligations under the covered agreements. The DSB meets as often as necessary to adhere to the timeframes provided for in the DSU.

== From complaint to final report ==
If a member state considers that a measure adopted by another member state has deprived it of a benefit accruing to it under one of the covered agreements, it may call for consultations with the other member state. If consultations fail to resolve the dispute within 60 days after receipt of the request for consultations, the complainant state may request the establishment of a Panel. It is not possible for the respondent state to prevent or delay the establishment of a Panel, unless the DSB by consensus decides otherwise. The panel, normally consisting of three members appointed ad hoc by the Secretariat, sits to receive written and oral submissions of the parties, on the basis of which it is expected to make findings and conclusions for presentation to the DSB. The proceedings are confidential, and even when private parties are directly concerned, they are not permitted to attend or make submissions separate from those of the state in question. Disputes can also arise under Non-violation nullification of benefits claims.

The final version of the panel's report is distributed first to the parties; two weeks later it is circulated to all the members of the WTO. In sharp contrast with other systems, the report is required to be adopted at a meeting of the DSB within 60 days of its circulation, unless the DSB by consensus decides not to adopt the report or a party to the dispute gives notice of its intention to appeal. A party may appeal a panel report to the standing Appellate Body, but only on issues of law and legal interpretations developed by the panel. Each appeal is heard by three members of the permanent seven-member Appellate Body set up by the Dispute Settlement Body and broadly representing the range of WTO membership. Members of the Appellate Body have four-year terms. They must be individuals with recognized standing in the field of law and international trade, not affiliated with any government. The Appellate Body may uphold, modify or reverse the panel's legal findings and conclusions. Normally appeals should not last more than 60 days, with an absolute maximum of 90 days. The possibility for appeal makes the WTO dispute resolution system unique among the judicial processes of dispute settlement in general public international law.

Members may express their views on the report of the Appellate Body, but they cannot derail it. The DSU states unequivocally that an Appellate Body report shall be adopted by the DSB and unconditionally accepted by the parties, unless the DSB decides by consensus within thirty days of its circulation not to adopt the report. Unless otherwise agreed by the parties to the dispute, the period from establishment of the panel to consideration of the report by the DSB shall as a general rule not exceed nine months if there is no appeal, and twelve months if there is an appeal.

The Secretariat has an influential role on dispute settlements. The Secretariat selects panelists, exercises financial control, writes an initial issues paper for adjudicators, provide economic expert advice, participate in internal deliberations and draft the actual ruling.

== WTO Appellate Body ==
The WTO Appellate Body of judges was first established in 1995. While a full complement consists of seven judges, the Appellate Body can hear an appeal with a minimum of three. The full term for an Appellate Body judge's appointment lasts four years with the a possibility of a reappointment for a second term.

By July 2018, there were only four judges remaining, as others had completed their 4-year terms and the term for one of these judges ends later in 2018. According to an article by the Waterloo, Ontario-based independent think tank Centre for International Governance Innovation (CIGI)—supported by the Canadian federal government, the Office of the United States Trade Representative, which is seeking WTO reforms, has blocked any re-appointments.

The Appellate Body is designated with a level of authority, pertaining to procedural issues. The Appellate Body has been met with much criticism, as it is said to have the potential to threaten the balance and exacerbate existing inequalities. The Appellate Body has accomplished several significant reforms; broadened access of third parties in appellate proceedings, opened the door to amicus curiae submissions by private individuals, and endorsed private counsels to represent governments.

According to a 2022 study, the creation of the Appellate Body and the manner of its evolution was largely unanticipated by WTO member states.

== Compliance ==
The DSU addresses the question of compliance and retaliation. Within thirty days of the adoption of the report, the member concerned is to inform the DSB of its intentions in respect of implementation of the recommendations and rulings. If the member explains that it is impracticable to comply immediately with the recommendations and rulings, it is to have a "reasonable period of time" in which to comply. This reasonable amount of time should not exceed 15 months. If no agreement is reached about the reasonable period for compliance, that issue is to be the subject of binding arbitration; the arbitrator is to be appointed by agreement of the parties. If there is a disagreement as to the satisfactory nature of the measures adopted by the respondent state to comply with the report, that disagreement is to be decided by a panel, if possible the same panel that heard the original dispute, but apparently without the possibility of appeal from its decision. The DSU provides that even if the respondent asserts that it has complied with the recommendation in a report, and even if the complainant party or the panel accepts that assertion, the DSB is supposed to keep the implementation of the recommendations under surveillance.

== Compensation and retaliation ==
If all else fails, two more possibilities are set out in the DSU:

- If a member fails within the "reasonable period" to carry out the recommendations and rulings, it may negotiate with the complaining state for a mutually acceptable compensation. Compensation is not defined, but may be expected to consist of the grant of a concession by the respondent state on a product or service of interest to the complainant state.
- If no agreement on compensation is reached within twenty days of the expiry of the "reasonable period", the prevailing state may request authorization from the DSB to suspend application to the member concerned of concessions or other obligations under the covered agreements. The DSU makes clear that retaliation is not favored, and sets the criteria for retaliation. In contrast to prior GATT practice, authorization to suspend concessions in this context is semi-automatic, in that the DSB "shall grant the authorization [...] within thirty days of the expiry of the reasonable period", unless it decides by consensus to reject the request. Any suspension or concession or other obligation is to be temporary. If the respondent state objects to the level of suspension proposed or to the consistency of the proposed suspension with the DSU principles, still another arbitration is provided for, if possible by the original panel members or by an arbitrator or arbitrators appointed by the Director-General, to be completed within sixty days from expiration of the reasonable period.

While such "retaliatory measures" are a strong mechanism when applied by economically powerful countries like the United States or the United Kingdom or organisations like the European Union, when applied by economically weak countries against stronger ones, they can often be ignored. Whether or not the complainant has taken a measure of retaliation, surveillance by the DSB is to continue, to see whether the recommendations of the panel or the Appellate Body have been implemented.

== Developing countries ==
Like most of the agreements adopted in the Uruguay Round, the DSU contains several provisions directed to developing countries. The Understanding states that members should give "special attention" to the problems and interests of developing country members. Further, if one party to a dispute is a developing country, that party is entitled to have at least one panelist who comes from a developing country. If a complaint is brought against a developing country, the time for consultations (before a panel is convened) may be extended, and if the dispute goes to a panel, the deadlines for the developing country to make its submissions may be relaxed. Also, the Secretariat is authorized to make a qualified legal expert available to any developing country on request. Formal complaints against least developed countries are discouraged, and if consultations fail, the Director-General and the Chairman of the DSB stand ready to offer their good offices before a formal request for a panel is made. As to substance, the DSU provides that the report of panels shall "explicitly indicate" how account has been taken of the "differential and more favorable treatment" provisions of the agreement under which the complaint is brought. Whether or not a developing country is a party to a particular proceeding, "particular attention" is to be paid to the interests of the developing countries in the course of implementing recommendations and rulings of panels. In order to assist developing countries in overcoming their limited expertise in WTO law and assist them in managing complex trade disputes, an Advisory Centre on WTO Law was established in 2001. The aim is to level the playing field for these countries and customs territories in the WTO system by enabling them to have a full understanding of their rights and obligations under the WTO Agreement.

== Paralyzation ==
In the 2010s, the United States began expressing opposition to the WTO's Appellate Body, the WTO's highest court for dispute resolution. The Barack Obama administration began vetoing some appointments to the body in 2016. After Donald Trump became president, he complained that the WTO was "biased against the US" and threatened to pull the U.S. out. As of 2017 the U.S. won over 90 percent of its disputes against other countries, but lost nearly as many of the cases filed against it. The U.S. complained that China was too rich to continue receiving exemptions meant for developing countries, and believed the WTO's law enforcement was crippling the U.S. while enabling China's growth as a mercantilist superpower.

As Appellate Body members' terms expired, the Trump administration refused to approve any new appointments. Joe Biden continued to block replacements during his presidency. By December 2019, the Appellate Body lost the ability to rule on dispute cases because it lacked the necessary quorum of seven judges to hear appeals. The WTO dispute settlement mechanism has since been paralyzed. Without a functioning Appellate Body to make a final ruling, any case appealed to it is forcibly halted. As of April 2025, the WTO reported that 32 dispute panel rulings had been "appealed into the void", including 2 filed by the United States and 11 filed against it.

In March 2020, the European Union and 15 other WTO members agreed to a Multiparty Interim Appeal Arbitration Arrangement (MPIA). This gave access to an alternative appellate mechanism (arbitration as an appellate mechanism) while the Appellate Body was nonfunctional. As of August 2023, the MPIA consisted of just 27 out of the 164 WTO members and had issued two rulings.

== Timing of trade disputes ==
In an article published in the Journal of International Economics in 2017, WTO disputes filed by the United States between 1995 and 2014 were examined. The article's authors developed a theoretic model to explain that incumbent presidential candidates regularly filed trade disputes involving industries in swing states in the year prior to presidential elections.

== See also ==
- List of WTO dispute settlement cases
- Beef hormone dispute
- Trade barrier
