= Bombardier Aerospace and Embraer S.A. government subsidy controversy =

Series of trade disputes

Brazil and Canada engaged in the Bombardier Aerospace and Embraer S.A. government subsidy controversy over government subsidies to domestic plane-makers in the late 1990s and early 2000s. It was an international, adjudicated trade dispute.

== WTO cases ==
The following were brought to the World Trade Organization (WTO):

- WTO Dispute DS46: Brazil — Export Financing Programme for Aircraft (Complainant: Canada), 19 June 1996
- WTO Dispute DS70: Canada — Measures Affecting the Export of Civilian Aircraft (Complainant: Brazil), 10 March 1997
- WTO Dispute DS71: Canada — Measures Affecting the Export of Civilian Aircraft (Complainant: Brazil), 10 March 1997
- WTO Dispute DS222: Canada — Export Credits and Loan Guarantees for Regional Aircraft (Complainant: Brazil), 22 January 2001

There was also a more recent fifth case, WTO Dispute DS522, filed on 8 February 2017 by Brazil. It was based on Brazil's allegations that the Canadian government unfairly subsidized the Bombardier CSeries. Embraer SA claimed that the subsidies are an "unsustainable practice that distorts the entire global market, harming competitors at the expense of Canadian taxpayers." In late September 2017, the WTO announced that it would consider this dispute. A government of Canada spokesman provided the following comment. "All aircraft-producing countries provide some form of support to their aircraft industry ... Canada will be examining closely Brazilian government support." The WTO is not expected to issue a ruling until 2019 at the earliest.

== Rulings against Brazil ==
Brazil ran an illegal subsidy program, Proex, benefiting its national aviation industry, Embraer, from at least 1999 to 2000.

=== 1999 DS46 conclusion ===
A 1999 WTO ruling named a Brazilian scheme paying banks providing loans to Embraer clients, the Proex program, an illegal subsidy. The ruling concluded, "...PROEX interest rate equalization payments on exports of Brazilian regional aircraft are subsidies... (b) PROEX interest rate equalization payments... are not "permitted"... 8.2. Accordingly, we find that payments on exports of regional aircraft under the PROEX interest rate equalization scheme are export subsidies... ...[W]e recommend that Brazil withdraw the subsidies identified above without delay. [W]e conclude that Brazil shall withdraw the subsidies within 90 days."

=== 2000 DS46 conclusion ===
A 2000 WTO ruling requested the Brazilian government eliminate the Proex (Programa de Financiamento às Exportações) program, as it was, in fact, an illegal subsidy. The ruling stated, "...we conclude that Brazil has failed to implement the ...1999 recommendation that it withdraw the export subsidies for regional aircraft under PROEX within 90 days."

=== Program modification ===
As a result of the 2000 WTO ruling, Brazil presented a modified program that satisfied the WTO, Proex III.

The WTO states, "our conclusion that the PROEX III programme, as such, is not inconsistent [with the ruling] is based on the view that it is legally possible for Brazil to operate the PROEX III programme in such a way that it will: (a) not result in a benefit being conferred on producers of regional aircraft and, hence, not constitute a subsidy... 6.3 We wish to be clear, however, that it does not necessarily follow from our conclusion that future application of the PROEX III programme will, likewise, be consistent [with the ruling]."

== Rulings against Canada ==
A WTO panel also ruled that Canada illegally subsidized its indigenous regional airliner industry, comprising Bombardier Aerospace.

=== 1999 DS70 conclusion ===
In 1999, a WTO ruling found Canadian "assistance programs" in contravention of WTO anti-subsidy policy. While rejecting some of Brazil's claims, the ruling suggested Canada remove these subsidies and determined that "(b) ...Canada Account debt financing since 1 January 1995 for the export of Canadian regional aircraft constitutes export subsidies..."

=== 2002 DS222 conclusion ===
A 2002 WTO ruling named some low-interest loans from the Canadian government designed to aid Bombardier in gaining market share as illegal subsidies. CBC reported on one of the six illegal Canadian subsidies in late 2001 months prior to the actual ruling. While dismissing some of Brazil's claims that Canadian aircraft financing deals were illegal subsidy events, the 2002 ruling did: "(e) uphold Brazil's claim that the EDC Canada Account financing to Air Wisconsin constitutes a prohibited export subsidy... (f) ...that the EDC Canada Account financing to Air Nostrum constitutes a prohibited export subsidy... (g) ...that the EDC Corporate Account financing to Comair in July 1996, August 1997 and February 1999 constitutes a prohibited export subsidy..."

== See also ==
- Competition between Airbus and Boeing
- List of WTO dispute settlement cases
