= Cotton production in the United States =

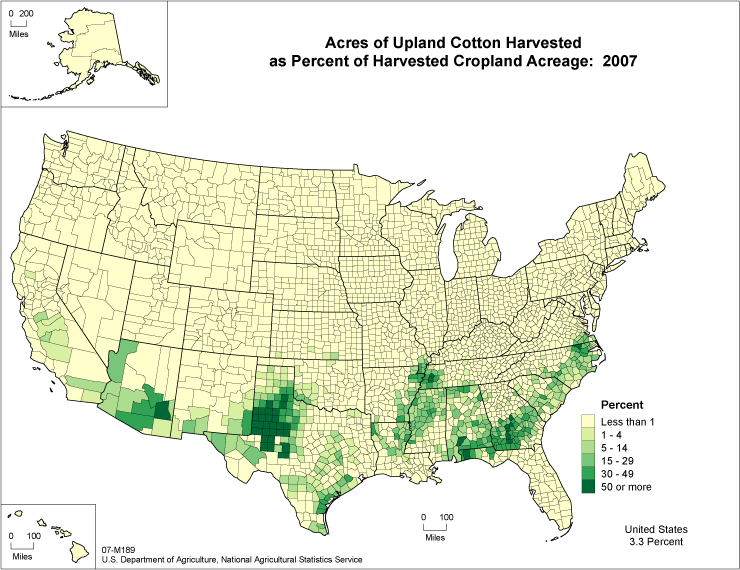
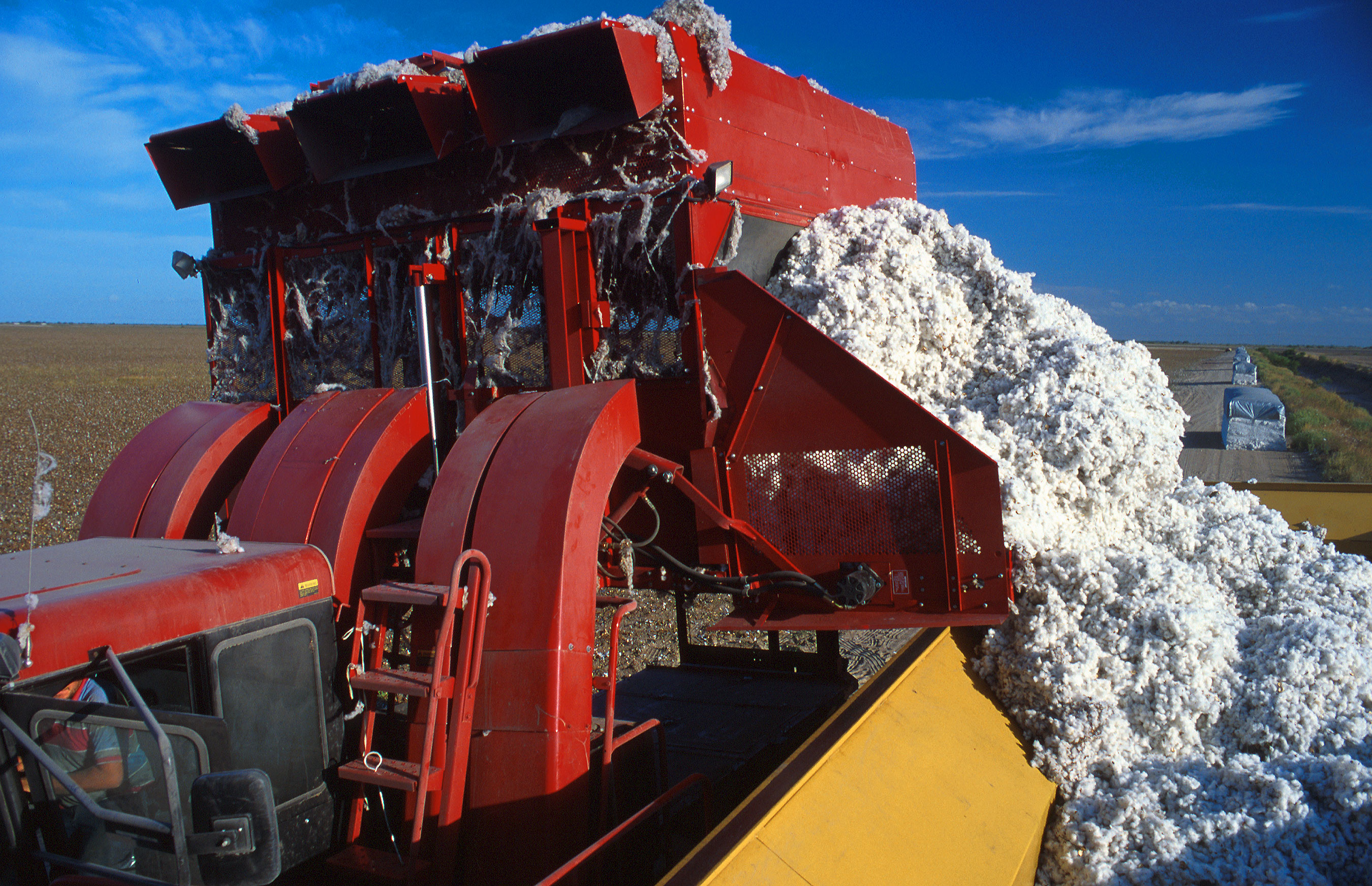
Left: Acres of upland cotton harvested as a percent of harvested cropland acreage (2007). Right: Unloading freshly harvested cotton using a mechanical cotton picker in Texas.

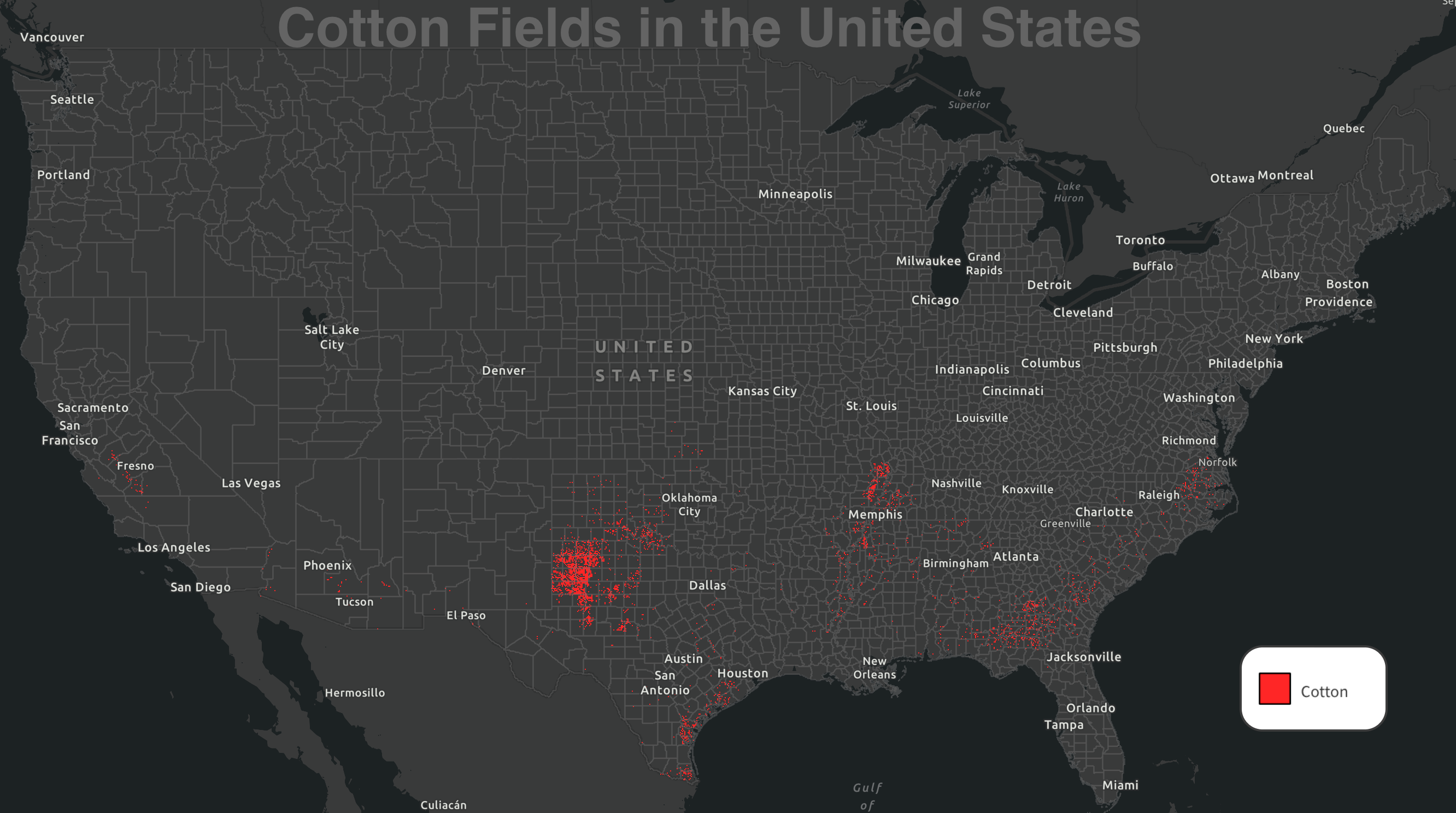
Cotton fields in the United States

The United States exports more cotton than any other country, though it ranks third in total production, behind China and India. Almost all of the cotton fiber growth and production occurs in the Southern United States and the Western United States, dominated by Texas, California, Arizona, Mississippi, Arkansas, and Louisiana. More than 99 percent of the cotton grown in the US is of the upland variety, with the rest being American Pima. Cotton production is a US$21 billion-per-year industry in the United States, employing over 125,000 people in total, as against growth of 40 billion pounds a year from 77 million acres (310,000 km^{2}) of land covering more than eighty countries. The final estimate of U.S. cotton production in 2012 was 17.31 million bales, with the corresponding figures for China and India being 35 million and 26.5 million bales, respectively. Cotton supports the American textile mills market and the global apparel manufacturing market that produces garments for wide use, which were valued at $748 billion and $786 billion, respectively, in 2025. Placing it 2nd among the American Crops after Corn for Grain ahead of Soybeans 3rd and Wheat 4th. Making it the 3rd most valued American commodity after Corn and Cattle for Beef. Furthermore, cotton supports a $3 trillion global fashion industry, which includes clothes with unique designs from reputed brands, with global clothing exports valued at $1.3 trillion in 2016.

Early cotton production in the United States is associated with slavery. By the late 1920s around two-thirds of all African-American tenants and almost three-fourths of the croppers worked on cotton farms, and two in three black women from black landowning families were involved in cotton farming. Cotton farming was one of the major areas of racial tension in its history, where many whites expressed concerns about the mass employment of blacks in the industry and the dramatic growth of black landowners. Southern black cotton farmers faced discrimination and strikes often broke out by black cotton farmers. Although the industry was badly affected by falling prices and pests in the early 1920s, the mechanization of agriculture created additional pressures on those working in the industry. Social pressures caused by returning African-American World War I veterans demanding increased civil rights being met by a resurgence of the Ku Klux Klan and the violence the Klan inflicted on rural African Americans explains why many African Americans moved to northern American cities in the 1920s through the 1950s during the "Great Migration" as mechanization of agriculture was introduced, leaving many unemployed. The Hopson Planting Company produced the first crop of cotton to be entirely planted, harvested, and baled by machinery in 1944.

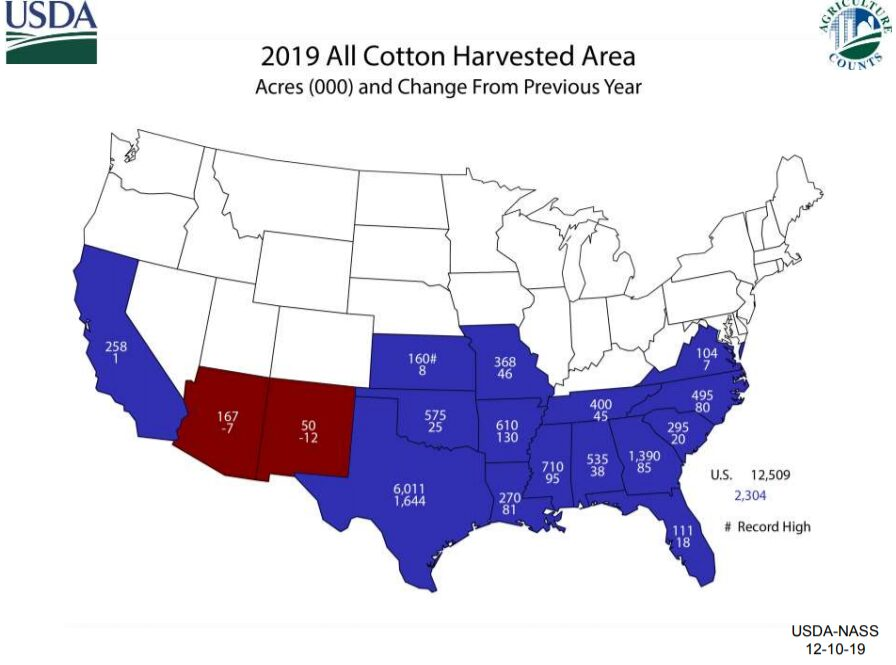

== History ==
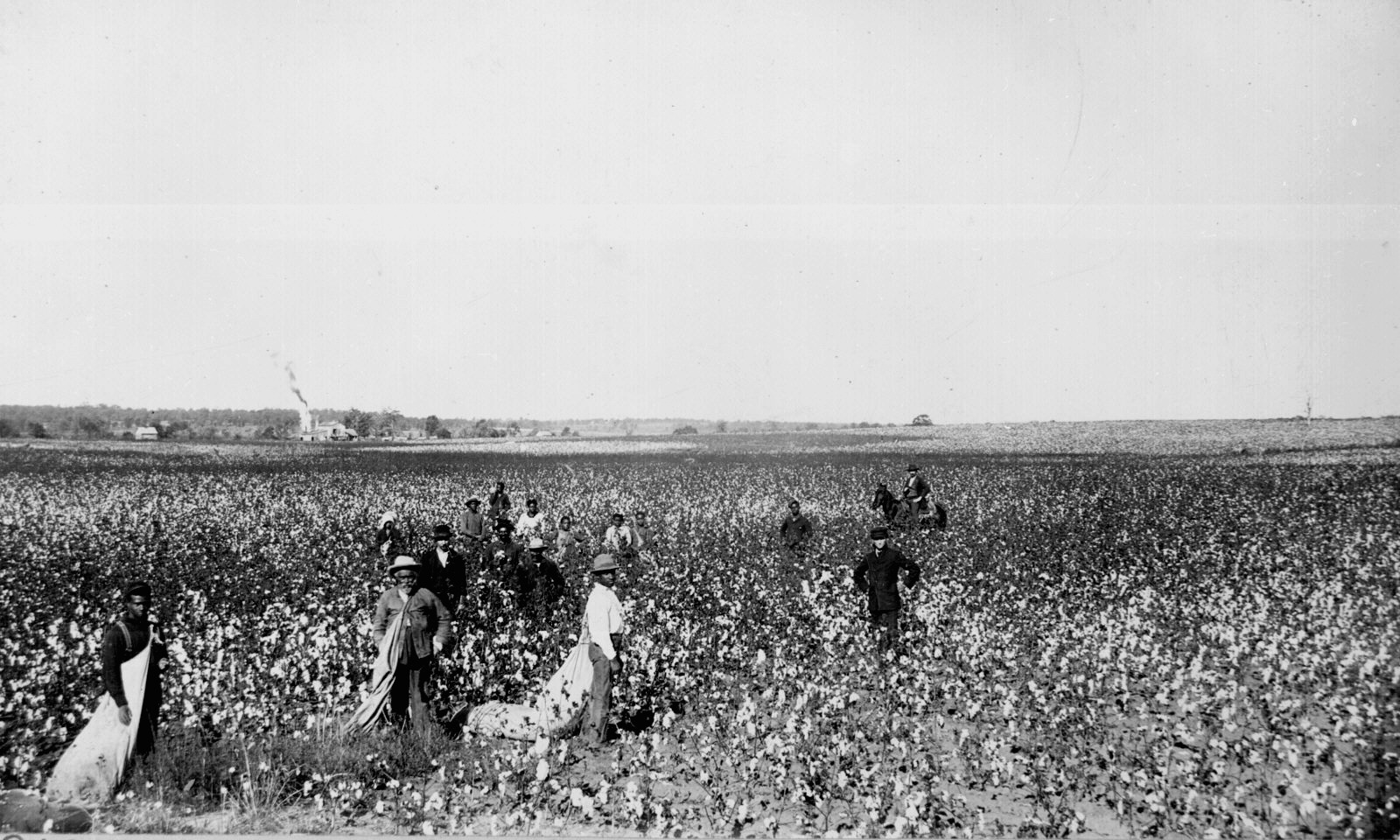
Picking cotton in Oklahoma (1897)

=== Background ===
Native Americans were observed growing cotton by the Coronado expedition in the early 1540s. This also ushered the slave trade to meet the growing need for labor to grow cotton, a labor-intensive crop and a cash crop of immense economic worth. As the chief crop, the southern part of the United States prospered thanks to its slavery-dependent economy. Over the centuries, cotton became a staple crop in American agriculture. Cotton farming was also subsidized in the country by the U.S. government, as a trade policy, specifically to the "corporate agribusiness" almost ruined the economy of people in many underdeveloped countries such as Mali and many other developing countries (in view of low profits in the light of stiff competition from the United States, the workers could hardly make both ends meet to survive with cotton sales).

=== Early period ===
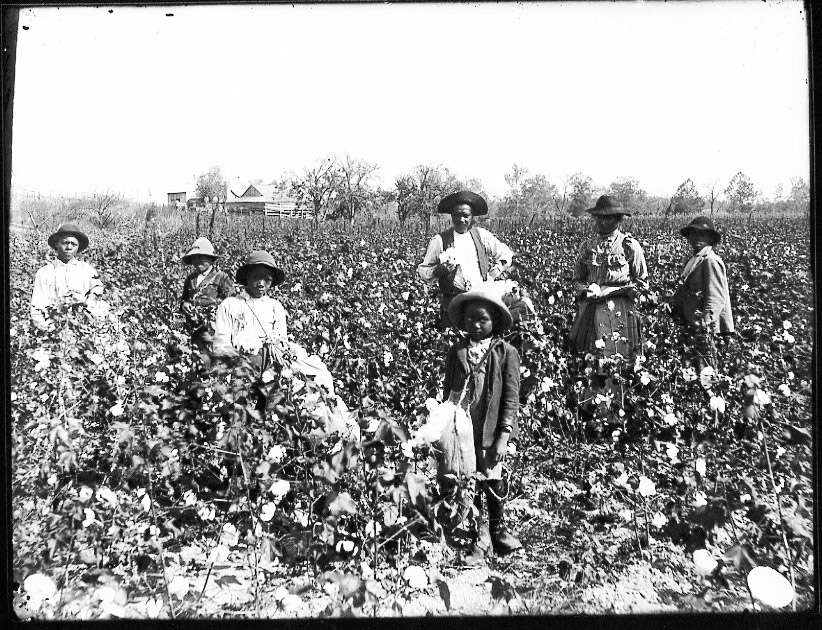
Black cotton farming family

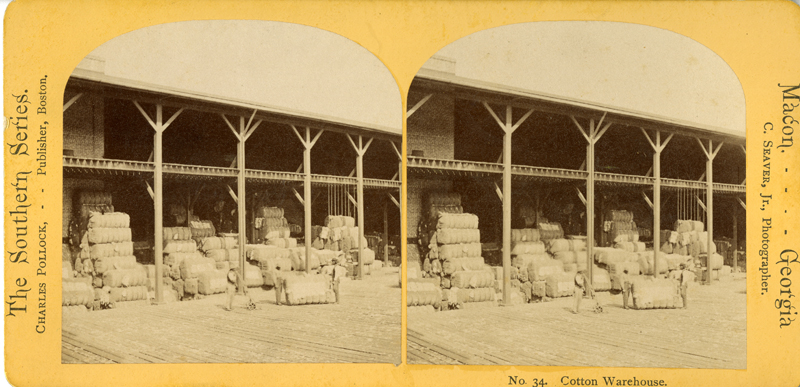
Adams & Bazemore Cotton Warehouse, Macon, GA, c. 1877

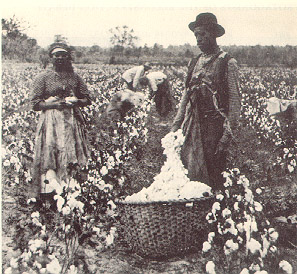
Black cotton workers, 1886

Cotton has been planted and cultured in the United States since before the American Revolution, especially in South Carolina. It expanded to the west very dramatically after 1800—all the way to Texas—thanks to the cotton gin (also known as a cotton engine). Plantation owners enslaved people from Africa and the Caribbean to hoe and harvest the crop. Prior to the U.S. Civil War, cotton production expanded from 750,000 bales in 1830 to 2.85 million bales in 1850. It was by far the nation's main export, providing the basis for the rapidly growing cotton textile industry in Britain and France, as well as the Northeastern United States.

After the Civil War, cotton production expanded to small farms, operated by white and black tenant farmers and sharecroppers. The quantity exported held steady, at 3,000,000 bales, but prices on the world market fell. Although there was some work involved in planting the seeds, and cultivating or holding out the weeds, the critical labor input for cotton was in the picking. How much a cotton operation could produce depended on how many hands (men women and children) were available. Finally, in the 1950s, new mechanical harvesters allowed a handful of workers to pick as much as 100 had done before. The result was a large-scale exodus of the white and black cotton farmers from the south. However, a different issue arose when certain bugs took a liking to cotton, the boll weevils, and pink bollworms. The invasion of these bugs began in the 1950s, a time in which cotton farms were facing a multitude of struggles. The bugs were destroying these cotton fields resulting in many farms losing their cotton crop. This obstacle heavily impacted the cotton industry because it caused many small plot farms to fall due to the inability to produce, loss of market connections, and financial difficulties. Faced with this hardship, the National Cotton Council of America created a special task group known as the Industry Wide Committee on the Future of the Cotton Council to study the potential future of the cotton industry as it was facing difficulties. More organizations within the NCC continued to be created in an attempt to resurrect the industry and the most important one created was the Cotton Producers Institute. This organization focused on promoting research and marketing itself to stand a chance against the synthetic fiber companies and raise money for themselves. However, not enough money was being raised, and the title was changed to Cotton Incorporated, CI, as it gained new leadership. Under this new leadership, the organization rebranded the image of cotton, marketing the luxuriousness of cotton-made clothing, etc. Anything they could to show the public how good cotton is trying to increase consumerism. Over the years, CI overcame obstacles and prevailed and in 1988 partnered with textile mills forming the Engineered Fiber System which spread globally. As cotton began to spread, consumers began expecting more, and the cotton market took off. Thanks to CI, cotton became popular with consumers and its budget had increased exponentially giving them a way into the world of fashion. By the 1970s, with technological advancements, most cotton was grown in large automated farms in the Southwest, and the production of cotton became even more efficient.

In the 19th century, the introduction of machinery such as the spinning jenny, power loom, and cotton gin brought in more profits, and "cotton towns" (settlements that formed an economy based on the cotton trade) sprung up throughout the U.S. Following the Civil War and the abolition of slavery in the United States, the boll weevil, a pest believed to come from Central Mexico, began to spread across the United States, affecting yields drastically as it moved east. The fashion cloth of the blue jeans furthered the boom of cotton for three decades. The adoption of chemical pesticides to reduce diseases and thus increase the yield of the crop further boosted production. Further innovations in the form of genetic engineering and of nanotechnology are an encouraging development for the growth of cotton.

=== 20th century ===
The United States, observed in 1940 that "many thousands of black cotton farmers each year now go to the polls, stand in line with their white neighbors, and mark their ballots independently without protest or intimidation, in order to determine government policy toward cotton production control." However, discrimination towards blacks continued as it did in the rest of society, and isolated incidents often broke out. On September 25, 1961, Herbert Lee, a black cotton farmer and voter-registration organizer, was shot in the head and killed by white state legislator E. H. Hurst in Liberty, Mississippi. Yet the cotton industry continued to be very important for blacks in the southern United States, much more so than for whites. By the late 1920s around two-thirds of all African-American tenants and almost three-fourths of the croppers worked on cotton farms. Three out of four black farm operators earned at least 40% of their income from cotton farming during this period. Studies conducted during the same period indicated that two in three black women from black landowning families were involved in cotton farming.

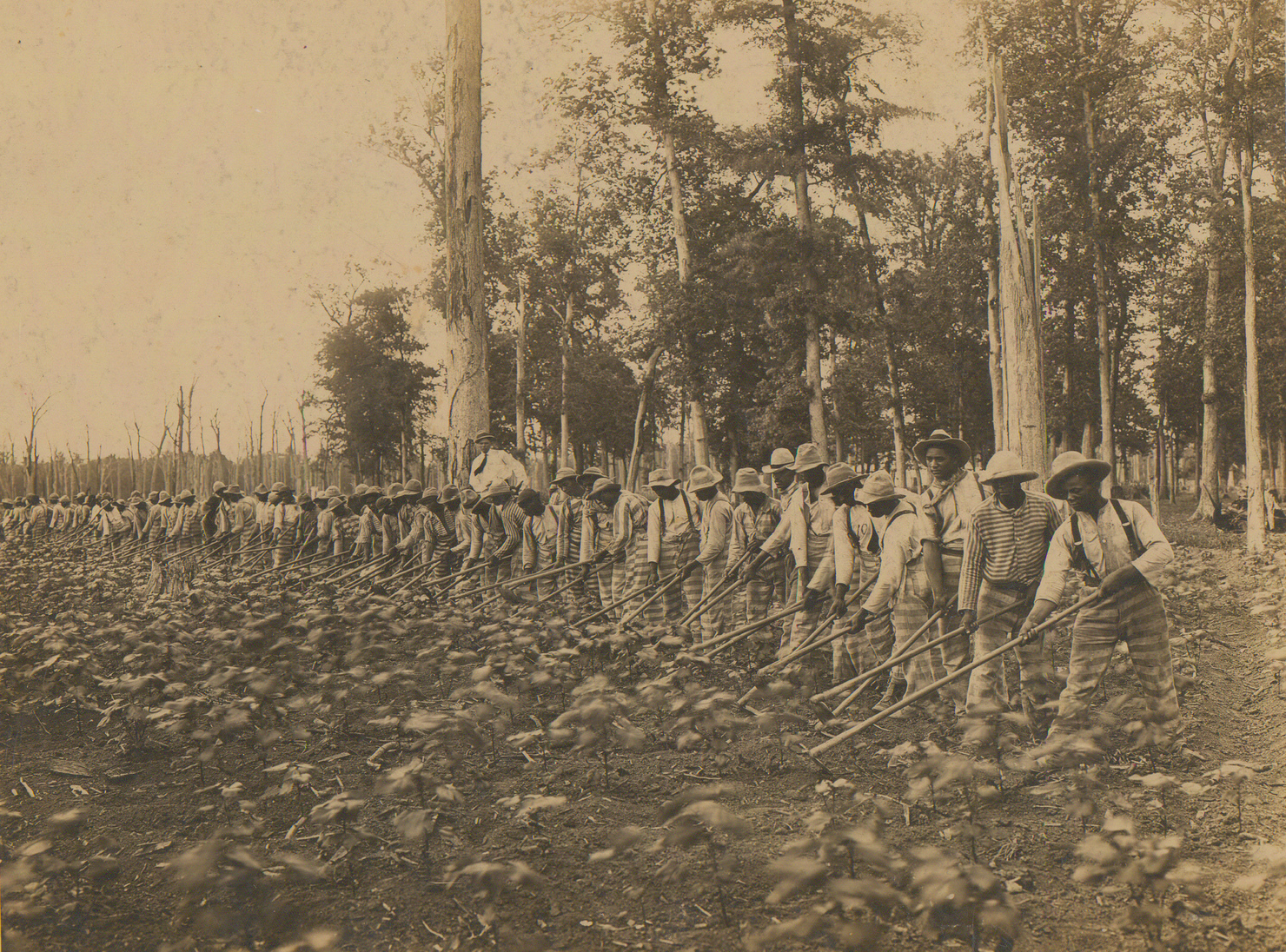
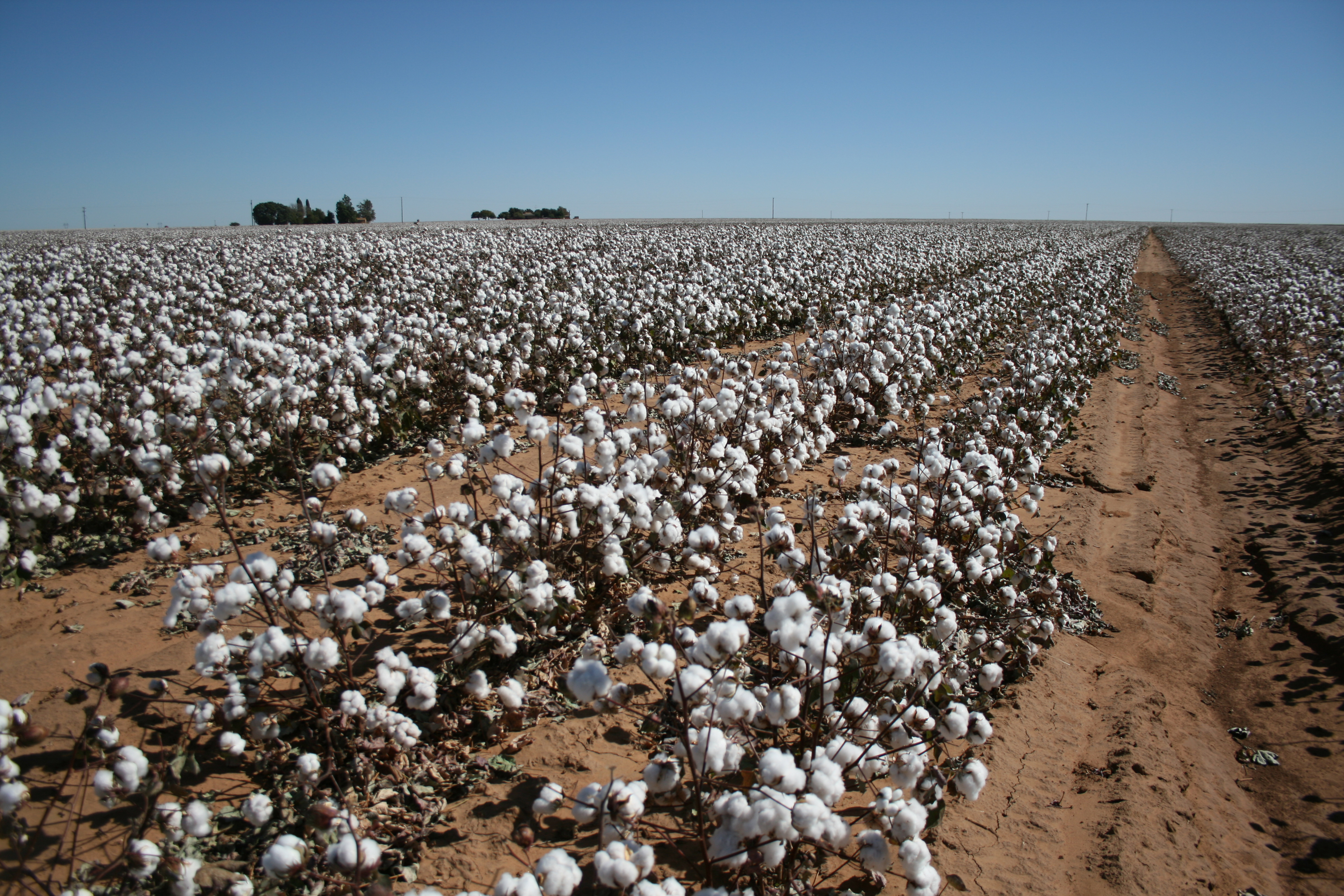
Left: Cotton farming in Mississippi using Parchman prison convicts (1911).
Right: Cotton field ready for harvest in West Texas (2007).

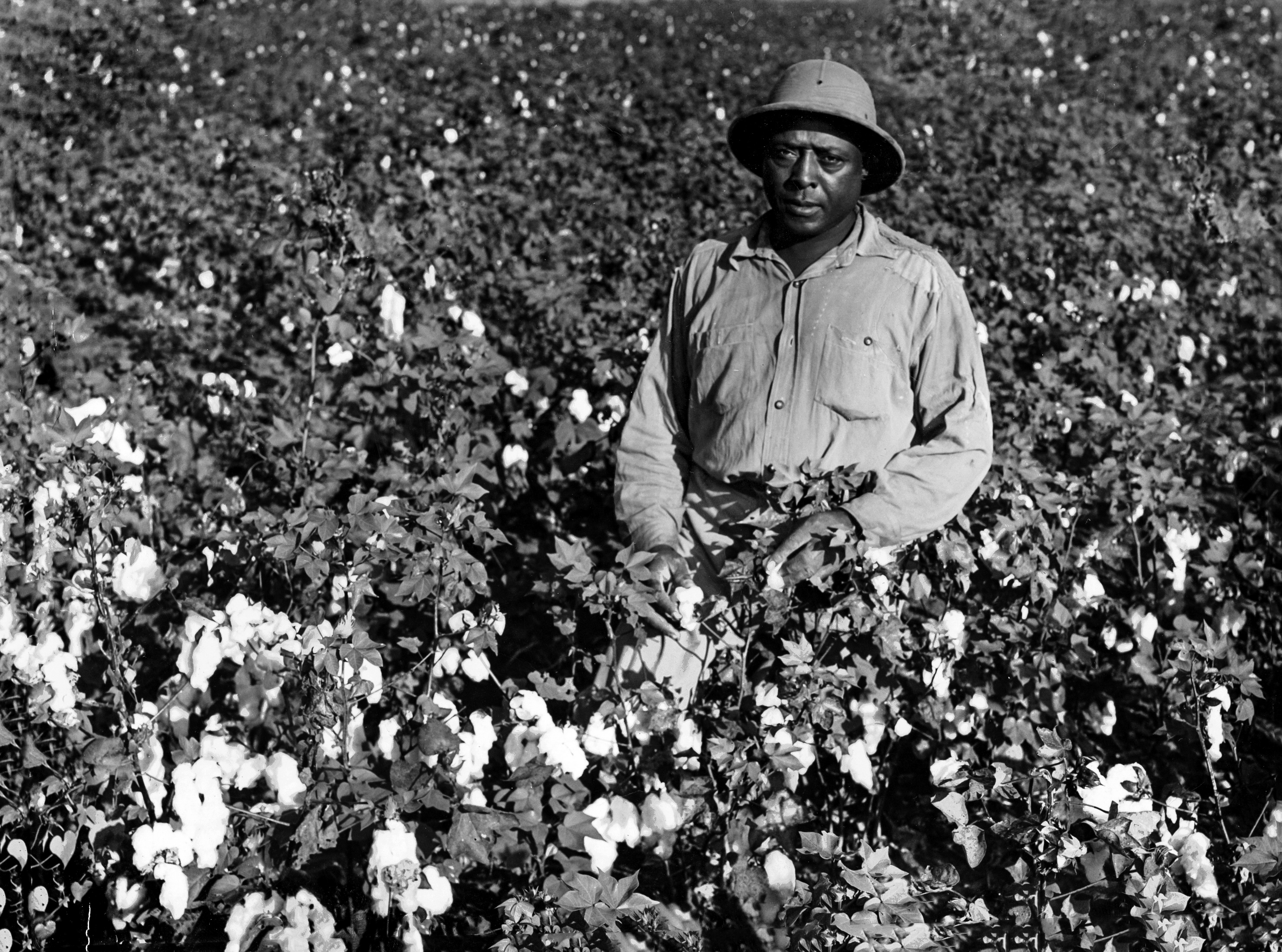
Farm Worker in East Texas Cotton Field -- 1940s

The average production of lint per acre in 1914 was estimated by the United States Department of Agriculture to be 209 pounds, a nominal change from 1911 when it was 208 pounds. In the early 1910s, the average yield per acre varied between states: North Carolina (290 pounds), Missouri (279 pounds), South Carolina (255 pounds), and Georgia (239 pounds); the yield in California (500 pounds) was attributed to growth on irrigated land. By 1929, the cotton ranches of California were the largest in the US (by acreage, production, and number of employees). By the 1950s, after many years of development, the mechanical cotton picker had become effective enough to be commercially viable, and it quickly gained appeal and affordability throughout the U.S. cotton growing area.

The cotton industry in the United States hit a crisis in the early 1920s. Cotton and tobacco prices collapsed in 1920 following overproduction and the boll weevil pest wiped out the sea island cotton crop in 1921. Annual production slumped from 1,365,000 bales in the 1910s to 801,000 in the 1920s. In South Carolina, Williamsburg County production fell from 37,000 bales in 1920 to 2,700 bales in 1922 and one farmer in McCormick County produced 65 bales in 1921 and just 6 in 1922. As a result of the devastating harvest of 1922, some 50,000 black cotton workers left South Carolina, and by the 1930s the state population had declined some 15%, largely due to cotton stagnation. Although the industry was badly affected by falling prices and pests in the early 1920s, the main reason is undoubtedly the mechanization of agriculture in explaining why many blacks moved to northern American cities in the 1940s and 1950s during the "Great Migration" as mechanization of agriculture was introduced, leaving many unemployed. The Hopson Planting Company produced the first crop of cotton to be entirely planted, harvested, and baled by machinery in 1944. These bales usually measure approximately 17 cubic feet (0.48 cubic meters) and weigh 500 pounds (230 kilograms).

=== Recent period ===
In 2020, production totaled 14.061 million bales. This is a drop of over 5 million bales from the previous year. The average price was $0.58 per pound. The 1914-1915 season totaled 16.5 million bales. A report published by the USDA National Agricultural Statistics Service ranked the highest cotton-producing states of 2020 as Texas, Georgia, Arkansas, Mississippi, Alabama, Missouri, Oklahoma, Tennessee, California, and North Carolina.

== Pests ==
The boll weevil (Anthonomus grandis) and pink bollworm (Pectinophora gossypiella) are significant insect pests of cotton. During much of the 20th century, these pests caused substantial economic damage to the U.S. cotton industry, impacting producers and local economies. Both pests were introduced to the United States from Mexico; the boll weevil in the 1890s and the pink bollworm in 1917.

The United States Department of Agriculture's Animal and Plant Health Inspection Service (APHIS) initiated the Boll Weevil Eradication Program in 1978 to combat the boll weevil. The program was expanded to several states in 1988 and ultimately eradicated the pest from over 99% of U.S. cotton acreage. In 2018, APHIS, in collaboration with industry partners, successfully eradicated the pink bollworm from commercial cotton production in the United States.

According to a study by the University of Georgia College of Agricultural and Environmental Sciences, deer are a significant pest to the state's cotton crop, causing an estimated $152 million in annual damages. The study surveyed 525 growers, 29 consultants, and 16 university personnel, encompassing over one million acres of cotton. The results indicated that deer consumed between 33% and 41% of the surveyed cotton crop. The deer population in Georgia has experienced substantial growth, increasing from approximately 6,000 in 1950 to an estimated 1.1-1.2 million today.

== Exports ==
The United States is the world's top exporter of cotton. Four out of the top five importers of U.S.-produced cotton are in North America; the principal destination is Honduras, with about 33% of the total, although this has been in decline slightly over recent years. The next most important importer is Mexico, with about 18%, a figure which has been broadly stable, and then the Dominican Republic, although exports have declined as a proportion of the total in recent years. China imported about 11% of U.S. cotton last year, which was a sharp increase over previous seasons, allowing it to overtake El Salvador, which has consistently imported about 8-9% of the total. Cotton exports to China grew from a value of $46 million in 2000 to more than $2 billion in 2010. In Japan, especially Texas cotton is very highly regarded as its strong fibers lend themselves perfectly to low tension weaving.

== Cotton production by state ==
=== South Carolina ===
In 2020, producers in South Carolina harvested 179,000 acres of upland cotton.

=== Texas ===
Texas produces more cotton than any other state in the United States. With eight production regions around Texas, and only four geographic regions, it is the state's leading cash crop. Texas produces approximately 25% of the country's cotton crop on more than 6 million acres, the equivalent of over 9,000 square miles (23,000 km^{2}) of cotton fields. Texas Cotton Producers includes nine certified cotton grower organizations; it addresses national and statewide cotton grower issues, such as the national farm bill and environmental legislation.

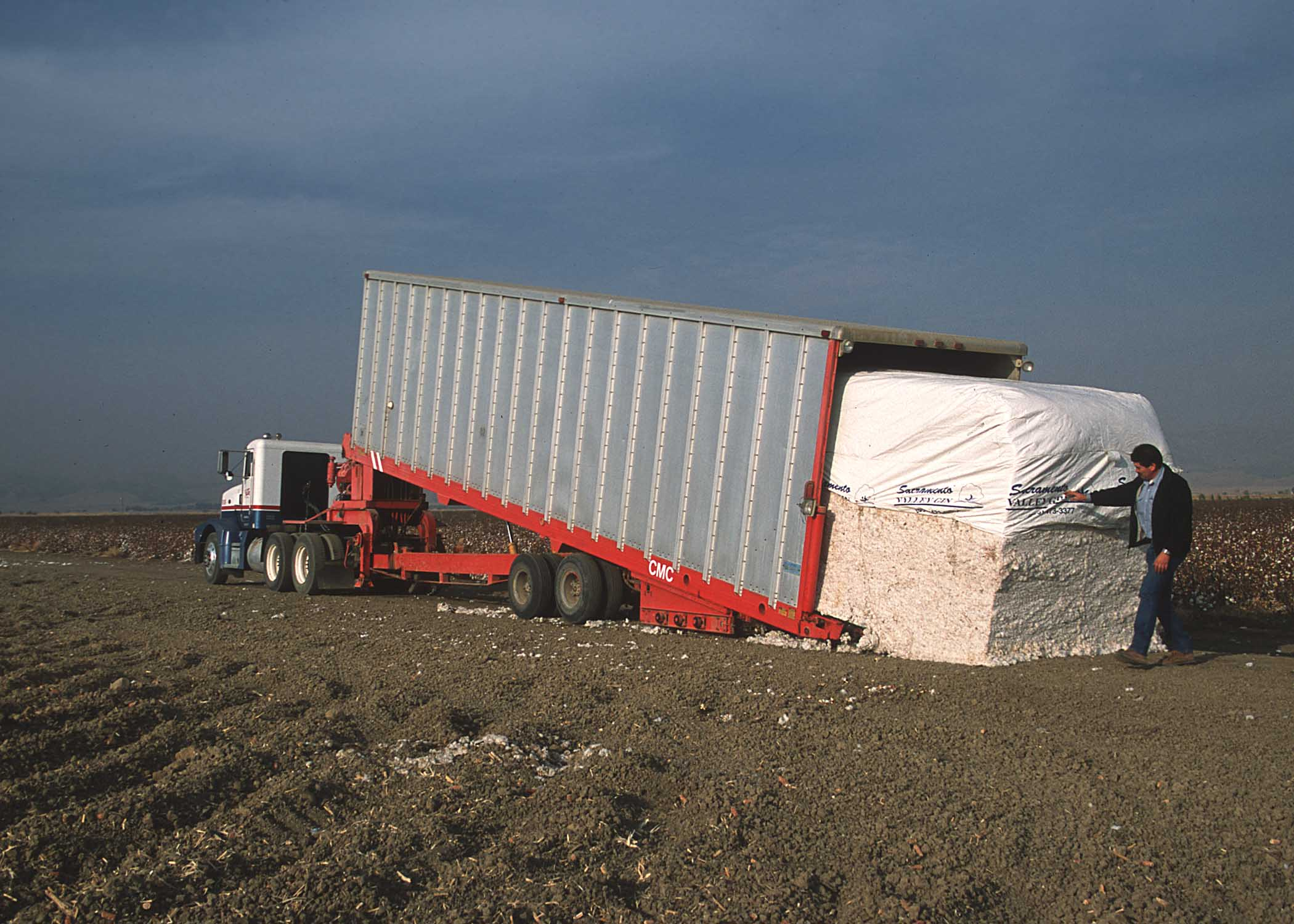
Loading cotton module in California (2002)

=== California ===
Cotton was grown in Mexican California. It became a major crop in the 1930s. California’s cotton is mostly grown in seven counties within the San Joaquin Valley, though Imperial Valley and Palo Verde Valley also have acres planted. In the 1990s cotton was also planted in the Sacramento Valley. California is the largest producer of Pima cotton in the United States. The California cotton industry provides more than 20,000 jobs in the state and generates revenues in excess of $3.5 billion annually.

=== Arizona ===
In the late 19th and early 20th century, federal agricultural engineers worked in the Arizona Territory on an experimental farm in Sacaton. It was here that Pima Indians cultivated various cotton hybrids seeking ideal traits. By the early 1900s, the botanist Thomas Henry Kearney (1874–1956) created a long staple cotton which was named Pima after the Indians who grew it. In 1910, it was released into the marketplace. While in 1987, Arizona was producing 66% of the country’s Pima cotton, it has dropped to only 2% in recent years.

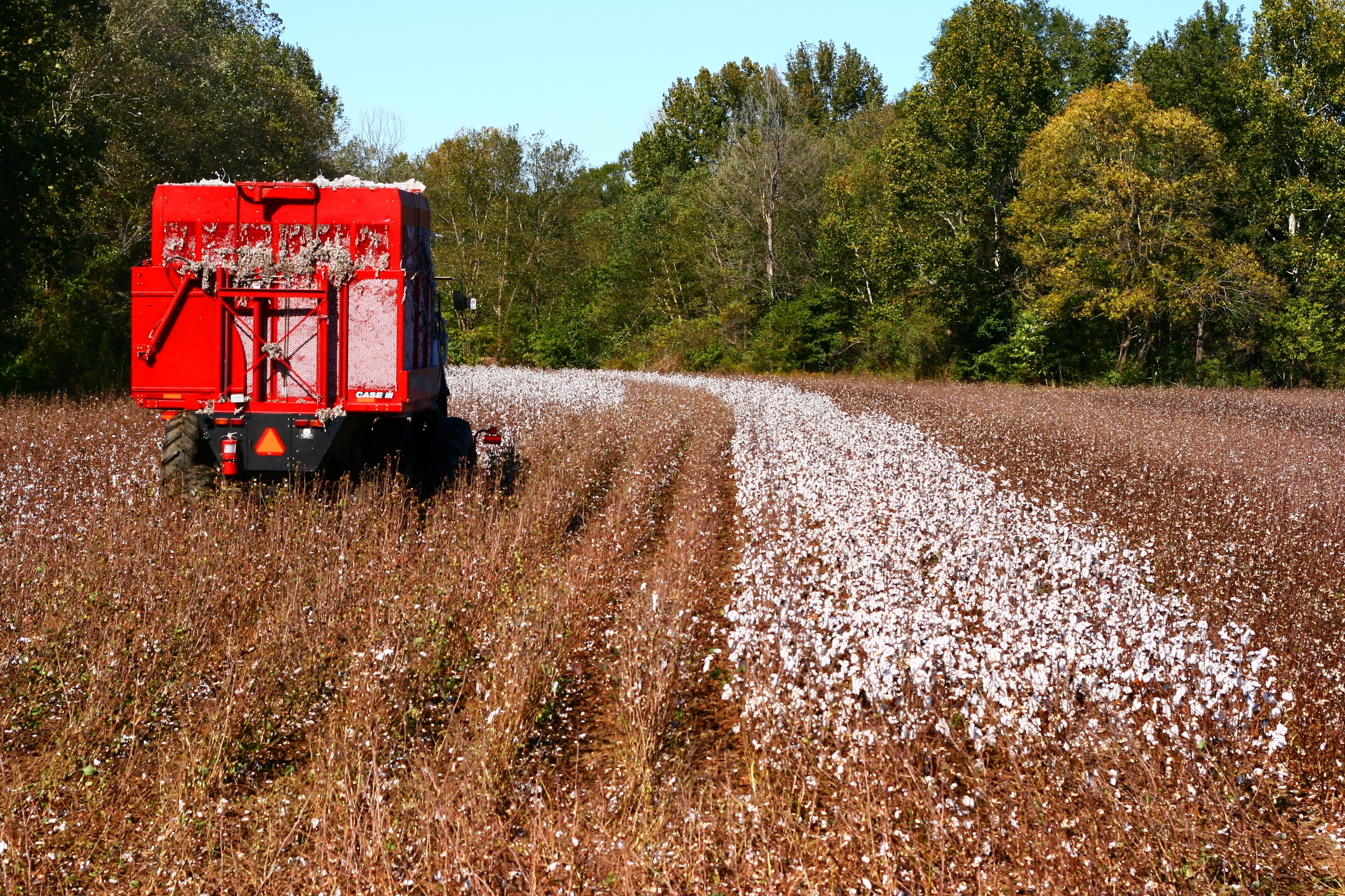
Cotton harvester in Mississippi (2007)

=== Mississippi ===
From 1817, when it became a state, to 1860 Mississippi was the largest cotton-producing state in the United States. Cotton is a major crop in Mississippi with approximately 1.1 million acres planted each year. The highest acreage recorded was in 1930 (4.163 million acres); the highest production year was 1937 (2.692 million bales produced over 3.421 million acres); the highest cotton yields were in 2004 (1034 pounds of lint produced per acre).

=== Missouri ===
The industry faces challenges from increases in cotton production elsewhere where US cotton exports had gone and shifts to less expensive synthetic fibers, such as polyesters.

From 2012-2016, Missouri was ranked eighth in cotton production in the United States with the average production value of $191,004,400. Missouri soil allows for the growth of upland cotton with the average bale weighing approximately five hundred pounds. The cottonseed from Missouri cotton production is used as livestock feed. According to the University of Missouri, cotton production per acreage in this state peaked in the 1953 and decreased to its lowest point in 1967. In terms of yield, Missouri yielded a record low of 281 pounds/acre in 1957 and a record high of 1,097 pounds/acre in 2015.

The top four upland cotton producing counties in Missouri are New Madrid (197,000 bales in 2016), Dunklin (171,200 bales in 2016), Stoddard (110,000 bales in 2016), and Pemiscot (72,000 bales in 2016). Other combined counties in Missouri produced 15,800 bales in 2016. In 2017, total Missouri cottonseed sales were 179,000 tons. Missouri upland cotton production in 2017 was valued at $261,348,000 with 750,000,480 pound bales produced in that year. According to the United States Department of Agriculture, upland cotton in Missouri was valued at 0.751 $ / pound in 2017. Cottonseed production was less valuable that year in terms of dollar value, with a total production being 255,000 tons valued at $39,824,000 ($152/ton).

Missouri grows upland cotton, and cottonseed, which is a valuable livestock feed.

=== Florida ===
Cotton growing is largely confined to western parts of the Panhandle. Over 50% of the Santa Rosa County's harvest is of cotton.

== See also ==
- Black Belt in the American South
- Cotton Research and Promotion Act
- King Cotton
- Slavery in the United States
- Brazil–United States cotton dispute
