= Argentina — Safeguard Measures on Imports of Footwear =

Argentina – Safeguard Measures on Imports of Footwear refers to two related disputes brought before the World Trade Organization (WTO) concerning Argentina's use of safeguard measures to restrict footwear imports.

The first case, officially known as WT/DS121, was initiated by the European Communities (now the European Union), which challenged the legality of Argentina’s safeguard duties on imported footwear. The WTO ruled against Argentina, marking the first significant use of the legal principle of parallelism—a requirement that a country conducting a safeguard investigation and applying measures must assess and apply those measures to the same group of countries or products throughout the process.

A second, nearly identical complaint was filed by Indonesia (case WT/DS123) over the same safeguard measures. Indonesia argued that Argentina’s import restrictions violated Article XIX of the General Agreement on Tariffs and Trade (GATT 1994) and provisions of the WTO Agreement on Safeguards. This case confirmed the ruling in DS121 and concluded with a determination that Argentina had indeed acted inconsistently with its WTO obligations.

== See also ==
- List of WTO dispute settlement cases
