= South Africa-Brazil Frozen Chicken Trade Dispute =

Trade dispute regarding dumping of frozen poultry products

In 2012, South Africa imposed anti-dumping duties on Brazilian imports of frozen poultry products. Brazil brought its case to the World Trade Organization, and South Africa chose to impose a general tariff on chicken imports, rather than anti-dumping duties against Brazilian importers.

== Origins of the dispute ==
In June 2011, the Southern African Poultry Association (SAPA) filed a complaint with the International Trade Administration Commission (ITAC) of South Africa about the alleged dumping of Brazilian frozen chicken products in the Southern African Customs Union (SACU) countries, Botswana, Lesotho, Namibia and South Africa. ITAC launched its investigation in June 2011. After examining the relevant data in the South African market between 2008 and 2010, the ITAC imposed provisional anti-dumping duties of between 6% and 63% in January 2012, following an investigation that concluded that three major Brazilian exporters sold chicken products at prices below their domestic market cost.

The ITAC concluded that SACU chicken suffered material injury due to price undercutting, lower profit margins, reduced market share, lower revenue growth and under-utilization of production capacity. The Commission's report estimates the dumping margin for whole frozen chickens at 63 percent and 47 percent for boneless cuts.

The Brazilian Poultry Association (UBABEF) argued that the duties were put in place to protect the inefficient South African poultry industry, and that higher costs would be passed onto consumers, approximately US$70 million per year.

Brazil made informal attempts to resolve the dispute, such as by proposing a trade-off between Brazilian chicken and South African wine, which the South Africans rejected.

== Case Brought Before WTO ==
On 21 June 2012, Brazil requested consultations with South Africa in the WTO regarding the imposition of anti-dumping duties on Brazilian chicken, formally beginning the WTO's dispute resolution process. Brazil argued that South Africa acted on incomplete information, and that their initiation and conduct of the investigation were inconsistent with South Africa's obligations under the General Agreement on Tariffs and Trade and the Anti-Dumping Agreement.

In particular, Brazil took issue with the determination of injury, South Africa's definition of domestic industry, the evidence used and the process of investigation, asserting that ITAC failed to produce positive evidence for injury and questioned the methodology of the investigation as flawed.

Brazil said the South African Poultry Association had "grossly overstated" statistics on chicken imports and cited SA's "uncooperativeness" and "unreasonable attitude" as reasons to raise the dispute with the WTO.

== Resolution ==
After negotiation with the Brazilian government, South African trade and industry minister Rob Davies declined to implement the ITAC recommendations. He acknowledged the stiff competition that South African producers faced from Brazil, but said that there was need for a more “comprehensive strategy” that dealt with all poultry exporters to South Africa, to the dismay of the SAPA.

Instead of definitive anti-dumping duties, South Africa chose to impose import tariffs of up to 82% (up from 27%) on all poultry products originating from countries from which South Africa has no preferential trade arrangements, on the basis that the domestic industry was affected by all chicken imports, not only those from Brazil.

Davies acknowledged the need to protect South African producers, but said that the antidumping duties had failed to have the desired effect, and that a general tariff increase would likely be more effective.

== Reaction and aftermath ==
The South African Poultry Association was dissatisfied with this result, taking the position that to be effective, a general tariff would have to be imposed on all frozen chicken imports. However, this is not possible because of the EU-South African Trade and Development Cooperation Agreement, which states that no tariffs may be applied by South Africa to goods originating from the EU.

Between January 2012 and May 2013, SAPA reported 5,000 job losses and the closure of five small-to-medium poultry farms, citing increased foreign competition.

SAPA estimated that ZAR 3.5 billion (US$390 million) worth of "unrealistically priced" chicken entered the South African market in 2012 alone, equivalent to approximately 5 million chickens per week, and that 20,000 jobs would be created if these chickens were produced domestically.

The South African Food and Allied Workers’ Union (FAWU) supported SAPA's calls for increased government intervention. In April 2013, protestors marched to Parliament to hand a memorandum to the Department of Trade of Industry to place stricter import tariffs on poultry imports from Brazil in order to protect 40,000 jobs in the sector.

Association of Meat Importers and Exporters CEO David Wolpert said that the removal of import duties would be beneficial to the South African consumers, as it would keep prices at “reasonable levels”.

== See also ==
- List of WTO dispute settlement cases
