= Argentina–United States lemon dispute =

World Trade Organization dispute settlement case

The Argentina–United States lemon dispute was a World Trade Organization dispute settlement case (DS448) challenging U.S. import laws. On September 3, 2012, Argentina requested the assistance of the World Trade Organization in hosting consultations to discuss the United States procedures. Argentina claimed that the prohibition of imports of this fruit for the previous 11 years, and other restrictive measures, lacked scientific justification. Argentina asserted that the United States was trying to cancel or impair the benefits that it should enjoy under the World Trade Agreements.

Lemon production in the United States primarily takes place in California and Arizona. In the 2013/14 season, lemon-bearing acres totaled 54,500, with California accounting for 46,000 acres and Arizona for 8,500 acres. The value of U.S. lemon production during that season reached $647 million, with California's growers earning 92 percent of the total value and Arizona's growers earning 8 percent. Over the period from 2008/09 to 2012/13, the average annual fresh lemon production in the United States was approximately 497,350 metric tons (MT). Imports averaged about 45,751 MT per year, while exports averaged about 95,574 MT per year.

== Proposed Rule and its Effects ==
The proposed rule aims to allow the importation of lemons from northwest Argentina into the continental United States. To assess the potential effects of this rule, a partial equilibrium model of the U.S. lemon sector was utilized. Under the assumption that no displacement of lemon imports from other countries would occur, importing an estimated 18,000 MT of fresh lemons from Argentina would lead to a price decrease of approximately 4 percent. Consumer welfare gains of about $25 million would outweigh producer welfare losses of about $22 million, resulting in a net welfare gain of around $3 million. Similar effects were observed for import scenarios of 15,000 MT and 20,000 MT.

Considering the likelihood of partial import displacement, where some of the fresh lemons imported from Argentina would replace other imported lemons, price and welfare effects would be proportional to the net increase in U.S. lemon imports. If half of the quantity of fresh lemons imported from Argentina displaces U.S. imports from elsewhere, the price decline for the 18,000 MT scenario would be approximately 2 percent. Consumer welfare gains and producer welfare losses would amount to about $12.2 million and $10.9 million, respectively, resulting in a net welfare benefit of about $1.3 million.

== Impact on Small Entities ==
The majority of businesses that may be affected by the proposed rule are small entities, including lemon producers, packers, wholesalers, and related establishments. The Animal and Plant Health Inspection Service (APHIS) welcomes public comment to better understand the potential impact on U.S. small entities.

== Executive Order 12988 ==
If the proposed rule is adopted, State and local laws and regulations concerning lemons imported under this rule would be preempted while the fruit is in foreign commerce. Fresh lemons imported into the United States are typically intended for immediate distribution and sale to consumers and remain in foreign commerce until sold to the ultimate consumer.

== Paperwork Reduction Act ==
The information collection and recordkeeping requirements outlined in the proposed rule have been submitted for approval to the Office of Management and Budget (OMB). The public is invited to provide comments on the proposed information collection and recordkeeping requirements. These comments will help evaluate the necessity, accuracy, and burden of the proposed information collection, and seek to enhance its quality, utility, and clarity while minimizing the burden on respondents.

== Origins of dispute ==
The U.S., along with Japan, filed their complaints over the import licensing system earlier in August (2012) and the European Union lodged a nearly identical case in May. Following others complaints, Mexico became the fourth country to challenge the Argentine policies. The four challengers assert the same basic allegation: That Argentina has used import licensing and registration requirements as an informal trade balancing program to favor domestic producers, withholding the licenses from importers unless they agree to certain export quotas. In March, 2012, 14 members of the WTO Council for Trade in Goods, including the U.S., EU and Mexico, said the regulations were creating long delays and resulting in huge costs for many of the companies doing business with Argentina. The countries said the policies were unbefitting a WTO nation, and urged Argentina to dismantle the licensing program.

U.S. Trade Representative spokeswomen, Nkenge Harmon said, "We are concerned with a disturbing trend in which countries engaged in actions that are inconsistent with their WTO obligations retaliate with counter-complaints rather than fix the underlying problem raised in complaint”. This particular case seems to be a part of larger problem and an act of retaliation.

== Problems ==
Argentina's National Plant Protection Organization (NPPO) requested that the Animal and Plant Health Inspection Service (APHIS) of the United States amend these regulations to allow lemons from the northwest region of Argentina (the Provinces of Catamarca, Jujuy, Salta, and Tucumán) to be imported into the continental United States. Northwest Argentina is the primary lemon-producing region in the country, and it experiences different pests than other citrus-producing areas in Argentina.

To evaluate Argentina's request, APHIS conducted a pest risk assessment (PRA) and risk management document (RMD). The PRA, titled "Risk Assessment for the Importation of Fresh Lemon (Citrus limon (L.) Burm. f.) Fruit from Northwest Argentina into the Continental United States," analyzed the potential pest risks associated with importing fresh lemons from northwest Argentina into the continental United States.

The PRA identified nine pests of quarantine significance present in Argentina that could potentially follow the pathway for lemons from northwest Argentina to the United States. These pests included Brevipalpus californicus (citrus flat mite), B. obovatus (scarlet tea mite), B. phoenicis (false spider mite), B. chilensis (Chilean false red mite), Ceratitis capitata (Mediterranean fruit fly), Cryptoblabes gnidiella (honeydew moth), Elsinoë australis (causal agent of sweet orange scab disease), Gymnandrosoma aurantianum (citrus borer), and Xanthomonas citri subsp. citri (causal agent of citrus canker disease).

However, the decision to lift the ban on lemon imports from northwestern Argentina faced opposition from the California citrus industry and industry advocacy groups such as the California Citrus Mutual. They expressed concerns about the potential introduction of pests that could damage U.S. groves and criticized the Trump administration's decision to allow the imports. Some lawmakers, including Rep. Julia Brownley and Sen. John McCain, also voiced opposition, citing fears of the spread of invasive pests and diseases that could harm domestic crops. Despite the opposition, the USDA proceeded with its decision to lift the ban, taking into account the negotiations and technical assessments conducted over several years. The USDA's decision was seen as a significant step in trade relations between Argentina and the United States, with Argentina aiming to gain a foothold in the U.S. market and provide a more stable supply of lemons year-round.

The Argentina lemon dispute and the proposed rule to allow the importation of lemons from northwest Argentina into the United States have sparked discussions and raised concerns about the potential impact on the U.S. lemon sector. The economic analysis suggests possible price declines, consumer welfare gains, and producer welfare losses, which could vary depending on the extent of import displacement. Public feedback on the proposed rule, particularly regarding its potential impact on small entities, is crucial for a comprehensive assessment of the situation.

== See also ==
- List of WTO dispute settlement cases
