= Korea — Anti-Dumping Duties on Imports of Certain Paper from Indonesia =

Korea — Anti-Dumping Duties on Imports of Certain Paper from Indonesia or Korea — Certain Paper or WT/DS312 is a dispute between Indonesia on April 7, 2010 forwarded to the World Trade Organization ( WTO ) and South Korea over Indonesian paper imports. South Korea accused Indonesia of "dumping" (pricing below cost) paper export, and forced some Indonesian paper producers to pay a higher tariff. On June 4, 2004 Indonesia requested that South Korea hold bilateral consultations. However, a bilateral consultation on July 7, 2004 failed to reach an agreement.

== See also ==
- List of WTO dispute settlement cases
