= Anti-Dumping Measures on Biodiesel by the European Union =

WTO Dispute Settlement case

Anti-Dumping Measures on Biodiesel by the European Union is a WTO Dispute Settlement case. Argentina and Indonesia were the two biggest exporters of biodiesel to the European Union. Together, they were responsible for about 90% or 2.5M tonnes of the biodiesel imports of the European Union in 2012. But by mid-2012, the European Union accused Argentina and Indonesia of dumping their biodiesel in the European Union, meaning that they were both selling their biodiesel under the price of the home market and implemented anti-dumping tariffs on biodiesel from the two countries, effectively halting flows.

== Background ==
According to the findings of the investigations set by the European Union, Argentine and Indonesian companies benefit from an unfair advantage because of the access they have to raw materials at prices that are low compared to the world market prices available to the EU producers of biodiesel. This is because of the high export taxes that the Argentine and Indonesian government imposes on raw materials used in the biodiesel production. The investigation found that the dumping margin of Argentina was around 41.9% and 49.2%, and for Indonesia between 8.8% and 23.3%. However, by applying the EU “Lesser duty rule”, the anti-dumping duties will be imposed at the level of the injury margin, for most exporting producers, which is for Argentina between 22% and 25.7%, and for Indonesia between 8.8% and 20.5%. In other words, the duties were fixed not to constitute a punishment, but to prevent further injury to the EU industry.

== Definitive Anti-Dumping duties on Biodiesel for Argentina and Indonesia ==
As of November 2013, the EU has imposed definitive anti-dumping duties on imports of biodiesel from Argentina and Indonesia. The anti-dumping measures consist of an additional duty of about 24.6% for Argentina and 21.3%, which measures were based on decisions taken by the Council after a 15-month investigation that the European Commission carried out in 2012. The investigation revealed that Argentine biodiesel products were being dumped in the EU market, just as thought by the congress. This Dumping have had a significant negative effect on the financial and operational performance of European producers. Also, the European commission has proposed tariffs of 217 Euros per ton of biodiesel imported, this has caused the sales of the biodiesel imported more expensive than the one produced nationally, causing the sales of the Argentine and Indonesia biodiesel to decrease, considering that the sales had decrease severely due to the strict import laws on biodiesel newly applied. The amount of biodiesel imported to the European Union has decreased a 36% overall in 2013, and just from Argentina's overall imports decreased a 57%. Also, the European government has started to charge a $1 tax per gallon of biodiesel in 2013, and it has constantly been increasing since then, making the biodiesel more expensive for the consumers. So as we can see, Europe has not only decreased the amount of imports of biodiesel from Argentina and Indonesia, but from other countries too. As a result, even though the total amount of imports have decreased drastically, the domestic producers of biodiesel have seen a huge increase in sale and in revenues thanks to the taxes and tariffs applied to imports that caused the drops in total imports.

=== Argentina ===
Argentina has presented a case (DS459) to a special group against the EU in relations to the biodiesel dispute in May 2013. This case was against certain restrictions in the imports and commercialization of biodiesel in Europe and also claims that say that the European Union was unfairly subsidizing the national biodiesel industry. In October 2016 the dispute panel found in favour of Argentina and ruled that the anti-dumping tariffs must be reduced. The European Commission is in the process of passing these proposals but so far has met with strong opposition from Europe's main biodiesel and oilseed producer states. A decision is expected in September 2017.

=== Indonesia ===
In Switzerland, Indonesia has officially launched a complaint against the EU (DS480) at the World Trade Organization (WTO) over anti-dumping tariffs Europe has lodged against Indonesian biodiesel imports since May 2013. The WTO established a dispute panel over similar charges already made by Argentina.
