= Chad P. Bown =

American economist

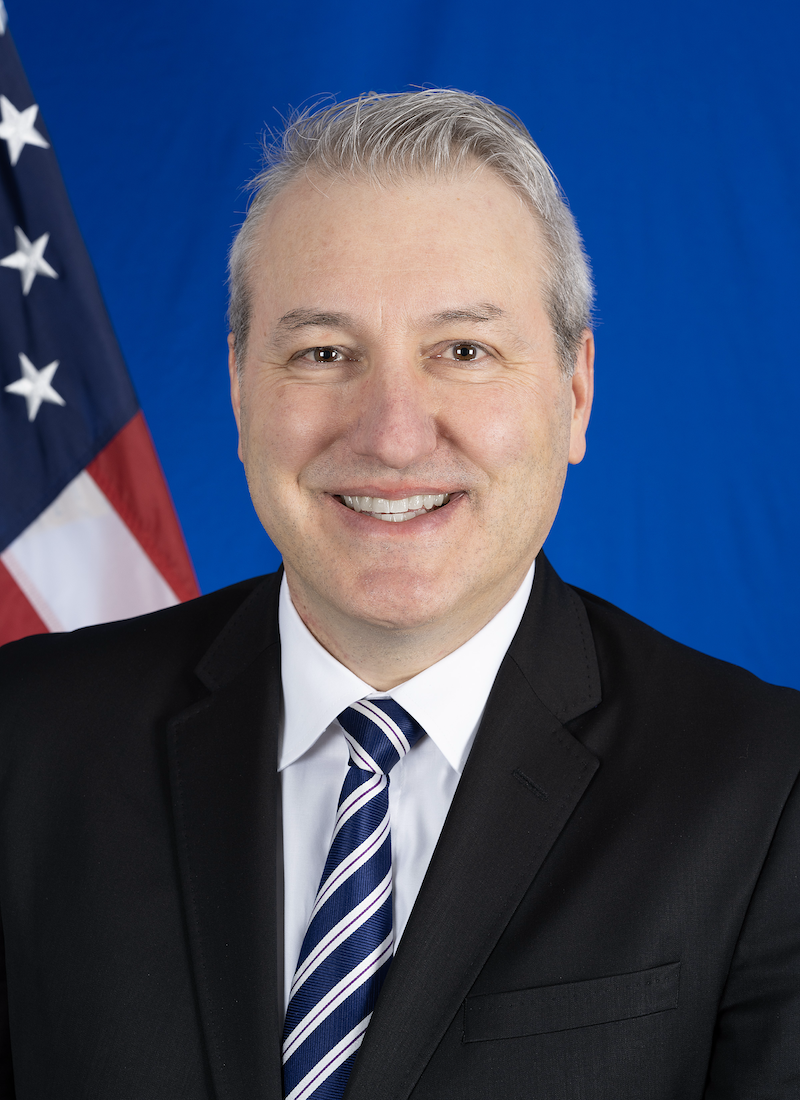
- Official portrait, 2024

Chief Economist of the United States Department of State
- In office January 29, 2024 – January 17, 2025
- President: Joe Biden

Personal details
- Education: Bucknell University (BA); University of Wisconsin, Madison (PhD)

Chad P. Bown is an American economist who served as chief economist at the U.S. Department of State in the Biden administration from January 2024 to January 2025.

== Education ==
Bown holds a BA in economics and international relations from Bucknell University and a PhD in economics from the University of Wisconsin, Madison.

== Career ==
Bown was a senior fellow at the Peterson Institute for International Economics (PIIE) from 2016 to 2023. Prior to joining PIIE he served as senior economist for international trade and investment on the White House Council of Economic Advisers from 2010 to 2011 and as a lead economist at the World Bank. He returned to PIIE in early 2025 after his service as chief economist at the Department of State from 2024 to 2025. He "has written extensively on industrial policy, supply chains, trade policy enforcement".
