= Anti-dumping measures on stainless steel from Mexico =

US-Mexico Trade Dispute: Stainless Steel (2006, USA/Mexico)

The US-Mexico Trade Dispute - Stainless Steel Sheets and Coils dumping is a trade dispute between the governments of The United States and Mexico. On May 26, 2006 Mexico requested consultations with the United States about a number of final anti-dumping judgments made by the US Department of Commerce. The judgments concerned the imports of stainless steel sheets and strips from Mexico, which were supposedly illegal dumping through the use of a "Zeroing" technique by the US Department of Commerce. Mexico believed that some of the laws, regulations, administrative practices and methodologies implemented by the US impaired and nullified the benefits added to Mexico, directly or indirectly, under the World Trade Organization Agreement on Customs Valuation, and that the anti-dumping laws were unwarranted. The consultations were held to discuss activities carried on between January 1999 and June 2004. This led to a panel being established in December 2006, the proceedings of which continued until May 2013, with a mutually agreeable solution being reached. Japan asked to join the consultation in June 2006.

== Products in question ==
Stainless steel, specifically in the form of sheets and coils, was at the center of the dispute. Stainless steel is an alloy containing at least 10.2% chromium.

== The complaint ==
On May 26, 2006, Mexico asked for an audience with the US concerning Anti-Dumping laws for stainless steel sheet and coils imported from Mexico to the US from 1999 to 2004. The consultations concerned:

- The statement of Administrative Action that corresponded with Uruguay Round Agreements Act
- Title 19 of the US Code of Federal Regulations of the US Department of Commerce regulations
- The 1997 edition of the Import Administration Anti-dumping Manual
- The method employed by the US department of Commerce to decide the space of dumping for the original product under investigation, which allowed the department to disregard negative dumping margins (a practice called to as "Zeroing".

Mexico believed that these laws and practices violated their rights under the World Trade Organization agreement and argued that no dumping was taking place. Specifically, Mexico stated that the US laws were inconsistent with:

- Articles VI:1 and VI:2 of the GATT 1994
- Articles 1, 2.1, 2.4, 2.4.2, 5, 6.10, 9 (including 9.3, but not limited to it), 11, 18 of the Anti-Dumping Agreement
- Article XVI:4 of the World Trade Organization agreement

== Panel history and decisions ==
On October 12, 2006, Mexico requested the production of a panel, which the dispute settlement body established on October 26, 2006. On December 20, 2006, the Director General finalized the panel's membership. In May 2007, the Chairman of the panel informed the dispute settlement body that the panel would not be able to complete the work until November 2007 due to scheduling conflicts.

On December 20, 2007, the panel report was published to all members. The panel concluded that the Zeroing Model used by the US department of commerce was not agreed with the Anti-Dumping Agreement. On the other hand, it also concluded that Simple Zeroing in periodic review was not inconsistent with the Anti Dumping Agreement. Mexico was thus only partially satisfied with the results of their complaint to the World Trade Organization.

On January 31, 2008, Mexico notified the appellate body that it would like to appeal some of the issues of law covered in the panel report, and that it wished to cover some of the legal interpretations covered by the panel. On March 26, 2008, the chairman of the appellate body informed the dispute settlement body that the 60-day period would not be sufficient to finalize the report.

On April 30, 2008, the appellate report was circulated to the Members. The new decision reversed the previous panel's decision stating that Simple Zeroing in periodic review was not in violation of the Anti-Dumping Agreement and reversed the ruling that the US was not in compliance with the Anti-Dumping Agreement. For the purposes of resolving the dispute, the panel also found it unnecessary to make an additional finding on Mexico's claim that Simple Zeroing in periodic review (as applied to the five periodic reviews at issue in the dispute) was inconsistent with the Anti-Dumping Laws. Additionally, the new decision did not find that the previous panel failed to discharge its duties.

As a result, the appellate body recommended to the dispute settlement body that the United States bring the issues and practices found to be inconsistent with the anti-dumping agreement, into conformity with the obligations standing under the agreement. On May 20, 2008, the dispute settlement body adopted the appellate body and the panel reports.

== Post-ruling and implementation ==
On June 2, 2008, at the dispute settlement body meeting, the United States notified the dispute settlement body that it intended to comply with the World Trade Organization obligations and requested a reasonable period of time to start implementation. After the lengthy process of appointing of an arbitrator, a decision was made on October 31, 2008, that the United States would have 11 months and ten days from the adoption of the Panel to implement the recommendations and rulings made by the appellate body. The reasonable time period expired on April 30, 2009.

On May 18, 2009, Mexico and the United States informed the dispute settlement body of an agreement regarding procedures. The next day, Japan requested to join the consultations. On September 7, 2010, Mexico requested the establishment of a compliance panel. After a number of years of work with the compliance panel, on May 31, 2012, Mexico requested that any work be suspended until further notice. The panel agreed to the request. On May 6, 2013, the panel circulated a report to the members, in which the panel had reached the conclusion that the two parties had reached a mutually satisfactory solution on April 8, 2013. As the case was settled and closed the panel issued a report that was limited to a brief description of the case and the statement of the conclusion.
