= Dispute Settlement Body =

Board of the WTO

The Dispute Settlement Body (DSB) of the World Trade Organization (WTO) makes decisions on trade disputes between governments that are adjudicated by the Organization. Its decisions generally match those of the Dispute Panel.

== Institutional structure ==
The DSB is, in effect, a session of the General Council of the WTO: that is, all of the representatives of the WTO member governments, usually at ambassadorial level, meeting together. It decides the outcome of a trade dispute on the recommendation of a Dispute Panel and (possibly) on a report from the Appellate Body of WTO, which may have amended the Panel recommendation if a party chose to appeal. Only the DSB can make these decisions: Panels and the Appellate Body are limited to making recommendations.

The DSB uses a special decision procedure known as 'reverse consensus' or 'consensus against' that makes it almost certain that the Panel recommendations in a dispute will be accepted. The process requires that the recommendations of the Panel (as amended by the Appellate Body) should be adopted "unless" there is a consensus of the members against adoption. This has never happened, and because the nation 'winning' under the Panel's ruling would have to join this reverse consensus, it is difficult to conceive of how it ever could.

Once it has decided on the case, i.e., whether the complaint had been shown to be right or wrong, the DSB may direct the 'losing' Member to take action to bring its laws, regulations or policies into conformity with the WTO Agreements. This is the only direction that emerges from a WTO dispute. There is no concept of "punishment" or even restitution. The DSB will give the losing party a "reasonable period of time" in which to restore the conformity of its laws etc.

If the losing party fails to restore the conformity of its laws within the "reasonable period of time", the DSB may—on an exceptional basis—authorise a successful complainant to take retaliatory measures to induce action on the part of the losing party. This is very rare. Almost all WTO members "voluntarily" implement DSB decisions in time. Of course, when a losing country brings its laws etc. into conformity it may choose how to do so; indeed, it may not necessarily make the changes that the winning party would prefer.

== List of chairs of the DSB ==
- David Walker (diplomat) 2019
- Junichi Ihara 2017

== Prominent cases ==
- US requirements for Turtle excluder devices (Shrimp-Turtle Case)
- The 2002 United States steel tariffs
- US exceptions to secondary broadcasting rights
- European Union (EC) restrictions on genetically modified food
- EC regulation of asbestos

== See also ==
- World Trade Organization Dispute 160
