= History of the World Trade Organization =

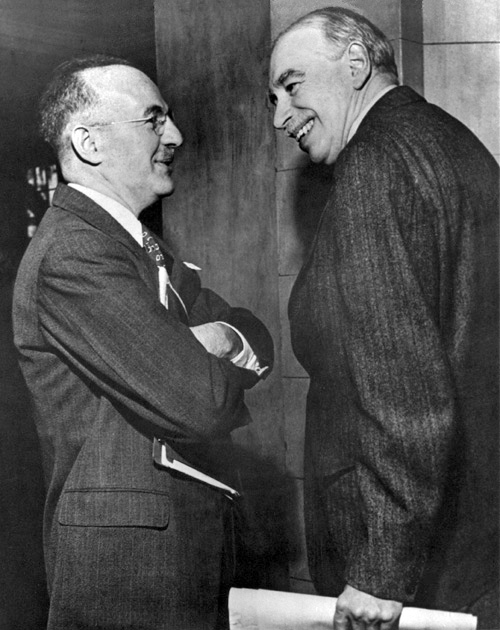
The economists Harry White (left) and John Maynard Keynes at the Bretton Woods Conference. Both had been strong advocates of a central-controlled international trade environment and recommended the establishment of three institutions: the IMF (for fiscal and monetary issues); the World Bank (for financial and structural issues); and the ITO (for international economic cooperation).

The World Trade Organization (WTO) is an intergovernmental organization which regulates international trade. The WTO officially commenced on 1 January 1995 under the Marrakesh Agreement, signed by 123 nations on 15 April 1994, replacing the General Agreement on Tariffs and Trade (GATT), which commenced in 1948. The WTO deals with regulation of trade between participating countries by providing a framework for negotiating trade agreements and a dispute resolution process aimed at enforcing participants' adherence to WTO agreements, which is signed by representatives of member governments and ratified by their parliaments. Most of the issues that the WTO focuses on derive from previous trade negotiations, especially from the Uruguay Round (1986–1994).

The World Trade Organization's predecessor, the General Agreement on Tariffs and Trade (GATT), was established after World War II in the wake of other new multilateral institutions dedicated to international economic cooperation – notably the Bretton Woods institutions known as the World Bank and the International Monetary Fund. A comparable international institution for trade named the International Trade Organization was successfully negotiated. The ITO was to be a United Nations specialized agency and would address not only trade barriers but other issues indirectly related to trade, including employment, investment, restrictive business practices, and commodity agreements. But the ITO treaty was not approved by the U.S. and a few other signatories and never went into effect.

In the absence of an international organization for trade, the GATT would over the years "transform itself" into a de facto international organization.

== GATT rounds of negotiations ==
The GATT was the only multilateral instrument governing international trade from 1946 until the WTO was established on 1 January 1995. Despite attempts in the mid-1950s and 1960s to create some form of institutional mechanism for international trade, the GATT continued to operate for almost half a century as a semi-institutionalized multilateral treaty regime on a provisional basis. Eight rounds of negotiations occurred under GATT.

=== From Geneva to Tokyo ===
The first real GATT trade rounds concentrated on further reducing tariffs. Then, the Kennedy Round in the mid-sixties brought about a GATT anti-dumping Agreement and a section on development. The Tokyo Round during the seventies was the first major attempt to tackle trade barriers that do not take the form of tariffs, and to improve the system, adopting a series of agreements on non-tariff barriers, which in some cases interpreted existing GATT rules, and in others broke entirely new ground. Because these plurilateral agreements were not accepted by the full GATT membership, they were often informally called "codes". Several of these codes were amended in the Uruguay Round and turned into multilateral commitments accepted by all the WTO members. Only four remained plurilateral (those on government procurement, bovine meat, civil aircraft, and dairy products), but in 1997 WTO members agreed to terminate the bovine meat and dairy agreements, leaving only two.

=== Uruguay Round ===
Well before GATT's 40th anniversary, its members concluded that the GATT system was straining to adapt to a new globalizing world economy. In response to the problems identified in the 1982 Ministerial Declaration (structural deficiencies, spill-over impacts of certain countries' policies on world trade GATT could not manage, etc.), the eighth GATT round – known as the Uruguay Round – was launched in September 1986, in Punta del Este, Uruguay.

It was the biggest negotiating mandate on trade ever agreed: the talks were going to extend the trading system into several new areas, notably trade in services and intellectual property, and reforming trade in the sensitive sectors of agriculture and textiles; all the original GATT articles were up for review. The Final Act concluding the Uruguay Round and officially establishing the WTO regime was signed 15 April 1994, during the ministerial meeting at Marrakesh, Morocco, and hence is known as the Marrakesh Agreement.

The GATT still exists as the WTO's umbrella treaty for trade in goods, updated as a result of the Uruguay Round negotiations (a distinction is made between GATT 1994, the updated parts of GATT, and GATT 1947, the original agreement which is still the heart of GATT 1994). GATT 1994 is not, however, the only legally binding agreement included via the Final Act at Marrakesh; a long list of about 60 agreements, annexes, decisions, and understandings was adopted. The agreements fall into a structure with six main parts:

- The Agreement Establishing the WTO
- Goods and investment – the Multilateral Agreements on Trade in Goods including the GATT 1994 and the Trade Related Investment Measures (TRIMS)
- Services – the General Agreement on Trade in Services (GATS)
- Intellectual property – the Agreement on Trade-Related Aspects of Intellectual Property Rights (TRIPS)
- Dispute settlement (DSU)
- Reviews of governments' trade policies (TPRM).

In terms of the WTO's principle relating to tariff "ceiling-binding" (No. 3), the Uruguay Round has been successful in increasing binding commitments by both developed and developing countries, as may be seen in the percentages of tariffs bound before and after the 1986–1994 talks.

== Ministerial conferences ==
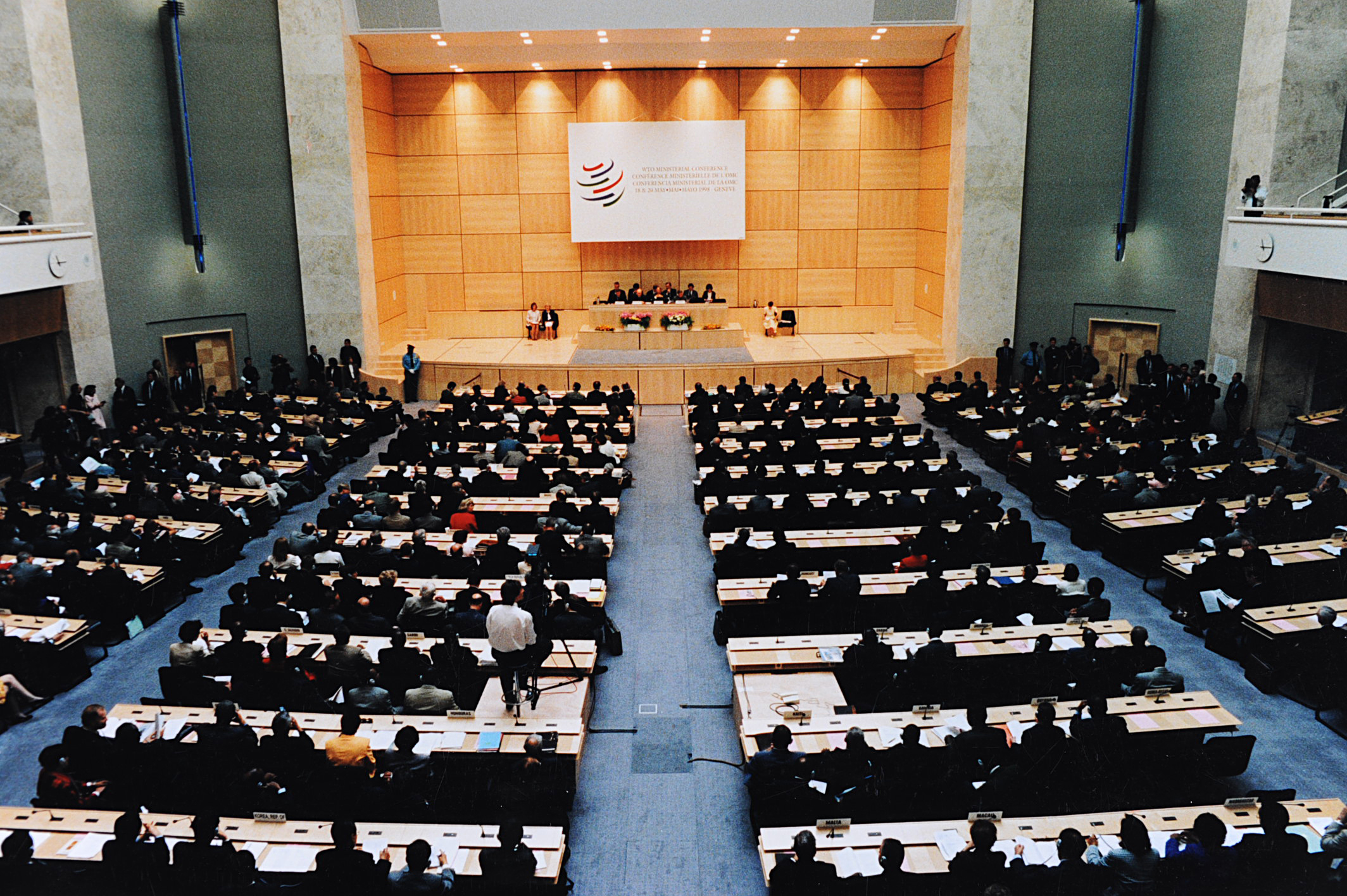
The World Trade Organization Ministerial Conference of 1998, in the Palace of Nations (Geneva, Switzerland)

The highest decision-making body of the WTO is the Ministerial Conference, which usually meets every two years. It brings together all members of the WTO, all of which are countries or customs unions. The Ministerial Conference can take decisions on all matters under any of the multilateral trade agreements.

- The inaugural ministerial conference (1996) was held in Singapore. Disagreements between largely developed and developing economies emerged during this conference over four issues initiated by this conference, which led to them being collectively referred to as the "Singapore issues".
- The second ministerial conference (1998) was held in Geneva in Switzerland.
- The third conference (1999) in Seattle, Washington ended in failure, with massive demonstrations and police and National Guard crowd-control efforts drawing worldwide attention.
- The fourth ministerial conference (2001) was held in Doha in the Persian Gulf nation of Qatar. The Doha Development Round was launched at the conference. The conference also approved the joining of China, which became the 143rd member to join.
- The fifth ministerial conference (2003) was held in Cancún, Mexico, aiming at forging agreement on the Doha round. An alliance of 22 southern states, the G20 developing nations (led by India, China, Brazil, ASEAN led by the Philippines), resisted demands from the North for agreements on the so-called "Singapore issues" and called for an end to agricultural subsidies within the EU and the US. The talks broke down without progress.
- The sixth WTO ministerial conference (2005) was held in 13–18 December 2005 in Hong Kong. It was considered vital if the four-year-old Doha Development Round negotiations were to move forward sufficiently to conclude the round in 2006. In this meeting, countries agreed to phase out all their agricultural export subsidies by the end of 2013, and terminate any cotton export subsidies by the end of 2006. Further concessions to developing countries included an agreement to introduce duty-free, tariff-free access for goods from the Least Developed Countries, following the Everything but Arms initiative of the European Union – but with up to 3% of tariff lines exempted. Other major issues were left for further negotiation to be completed by the end of 2010.

The WTO General Council, on 26 May 2009, agreed to hold a seventh WTO ministerial conference session in Geneva from 30 November–3 December 2009. A statement by chairman Amb. Mario Matus acknowledged that the prime purpose was to remedy a breach of protocol requiring two-yearly "regular" meetings, which had lapsed with the Doha Round failure in 2005, and that the "scaled-down" meeting would not be a negotiating session, but "emphasis will be on transparency and open discussion rather than on small group processes and informal negotiating structures". The general theme for discussion was "The WTO, the Multilateral Trading System and the Current Global Economic Environment"

== Doha Round (Doha Agenda) ==
The WTO launched the current round of negotiations, the Doha Development Round, at the fourth ministerial conference in Doha, Qatar in November 2001. This was an ambitious effort to make globalization more inclusive and help the world's poor, particularly by slashing barriers and subsidies in farming. The initial agenda comprised both further trade liberalization and new rule-making, underpinned by commitments to strengthen substantial assistance to developing countries.

The negotiations have been highly contentious. Disagreements continue over several key areas including agriculture subsidies, which emerged as critical in July 2006. According to a European Union statement, "The 2008 Ministerial meeting broke down over a disagreement between exporters of agricultural bulk commodities and countries with large numbers of subsistence farmers on the precise terms of a 'special safeguard measure' to protect farmers from surges in imports." The position of the European Commission is that "The successful conclusion of the Doha negotiations would confirm the central role of multilateral liberalisation and rule-making. It would confirm the WTO as a powerful shield against protectionist backsliding." An impasse remains and, as of August 2013, the agreement has not been reached, despite intense negotiations at several ministerial conferences and at other sessions. On 27 March 2013, the chairman of agriculture talks announced "a proposal to loosen price support disciplines for developing countries’ public stocks and domestic pp aid." He added: "...we are not yet close to agreement – in fact, the substantive discussion of the proposal is only beginning."

GATT and WTO trade rounds
Name	Start	Duration	Countries	Subjects covered	Achievements
(Switzerland) Geneva	April 1947	7 months	23	Tariffs	Signing of GATT, 45,000 tariff concessions affecting $10 billion of trade
(France) Annecy	April 1949	5 months	34	Tariffs	Countries exchanged some 5,000 tariff concessions
(United Kingdom) Torquay	September 1950	8 months	34	Tariffs	Countries exchanged some 8,700 tariff concessions, cutting the 1948 tariff levels by 25%
(Switzerland) Geneva II	January 1956	5 months	22	Tariffs, admission of Japan	$2.5 billion in tariff reductions
(Switzerland) Dillon	September 1960	11 months	45	Tariffs	Tariff concessions worth $4.9 billion of world trade
(Switzerland) Kennedy	May 1964	37 months	48	Tariffs, anti-dumping	Tariff concessions worth $40 billion of world trade
(Japan) Tokyo	September 1973	74 months	102	Tariffs, non-tariff measures, "framework" agreements	Tariff reductions worth more than $300 billion achieved
Uruguay	September 1986	87 months	123	Tariffs, non-tariff measures, rules, services, intellectual property, dispute settlement, textiles, agriculture, creation of WTO, etc.	The round led to the creation of WTO, and extended the range of trade negotiations, leading to major reductions in tariffs (about 40%) and agricultural subsidies, an agreement to allow full access for textiles and clothing from developing countries, and an extension of intellectual property rights.
(Qatar) Doha	November 2001	?	159	Tariffs, non-tariff measures, agriculture, labor standards, environment, competition, investment, transparency, patents etc.	The round has not yet concluded. The last agreement to date, the Bali Package, was signed on 7 December 2013.
