= Ministerial Conference =

Top decision making body of the World Trade Organization

The Ministerial Conference is the top decision making body of the World Trade Organization (WTO). There have been thirteen ministerial conferences from 1996 to 2024, usually every two years.

== Ministerial conferences ==
#	Date	Host city
1st	9–13 December 1996	Singapore
2nd	18–20 May 1998	Geneva, Switzerland
3rd	30 November – 3 December 1999	Seattle, United States
4th	9–14 November 2001	Doha, Qatar
5th	10–14 September 2003	Cancún, Mexico
6th	13–18 December 2005	Hong Kong
7th	30 November – 2 December 2009	Geneva, Switzerland
8th	15–17 December 2011	Geneva, Switzerland
9th	3–6 December 2013	Bali, Indonesia
10th	15–18 December 2015	Nairobi, Kenya
11th	10–13 December 2017	Buenos Aires, Argentina
12th	12–16 June 2022	Geneva, Switzerland
13th	26–29 February 2024	Abu Dhabi, United Arab Emirates
14th	26–29 March 2026	Yaoundé, Cameroon

=== First ministerial conference ===
The inaugural ministerial conference was held in Singapore in 1996. Its primary purpose was to initiate an international effort among global trading nations to overhaul the structure and mechanisms of the General Agreement on Tariffs and Trade (GATT) while preserving the considerable progress and success achieved by that system since its inception in 1948.

Disagreements, largely between developed and developing economies, emerged over four issues initiated by this conference; afterward, these were collectively referred to as the "Singapore issues".

=== Second ministerial conference ===
Was held in Geneva in Switzerland.

=== Third ministerial conference ===
The third conference in Seattle, United States ended in failure, with massive demonstrations and police and National Guard crowd control efforts drawing worldwide attention.

=== Fourth ministerial conference ===
The fourth conference was held in Doha In Persian Gulf nation of Qatar. The Doha Development Round was launched at the conference. The conference also approved the joining of China, which became the 143rd member to join.

=== Fifth ministerial conference ===
The ministerial conference was held in Cancún, Mexico, aiming at forging agreement on the Doha round. An alliance of 22 southern states, the G20 (led by India, China and Brazil), resisted demands from the North for agreements on the so-called "Singapore issues" and called for an end to agricultural subsidies within the EU and the US. The talks broke down without progress.

=== Sixth ministerial conference ===
The sixth WTO Conference Ministerial was held in Hong Kong from 13 December – 18 December 2005. It was considered vital if the four-year-old Doha Development Agenda negotiations were to move forward sufficiently to conclude the round in 2006. In this meeting, countries agreed to phase out all their agricultural export subsidies by the end of 2013, and terminate any cotton export subsidies by the end of 2006. Further concessions to developing countries included an agreement to introduce duty-free, tariff-free access for goods from the Least Developed Countries, following the Everything But Arms initiative of the European Union — but with up to 3% of tariff lines exempted. Other major issues were left for further negotiation to be completed by the end of 2006.

=== Seventh ministerial conference ===
Was held 30 November – 2 December 2009 in Geneva, Switzerland. The general theme for discussion was "The WTO, the Multilateral Trading System and the Current Global Economic Environment".

=== Eighth ministerial conference ===
Was held 15–17 December 2011 in Geneva, Switzerland. Membership agreement were made for Russia, Samoa, and Montenegro.

=== Ninth ministerial conference ===
Was held 3–6 December 2013 in Bali, Indonesia. 159 members of World Trade Organization agreed to the Bali Package which eases barriers to international trade.

=== Tenth ministerial conference ===
The WTO's 10th Ministerial Conference was held in Nairobi, Kenya, from 15 to 19 December 2015. The completion of Afghanistan and Liberia's accession to the WTO was on the agenda. It culminated in the adoption of the "Nairobi Package", a series of six Ministerial Decisions on agriculture, cotton and issues related to least-developed countries (LDCs). The Conference was chaired by Kenya's Cabinet Secretary for Foreign Affairs and International Trade, Amina Mohamed.

=== Eleventh ministerial conference ===
The WTO's 11th Ministerial Conference was held in Buenos Aires, Argentina, from 11 to 13 December 2017. It was chaired by Minister Susana Malcorra of Argentina. The Conference ended with a number of ministerial decisions, including on fisheries subsidies and e-commerce duties, and a commitment to continue negotiations in all areas.

=== Twelfth ministerial conference ===
The agreement to host the 12th WTO Ministerial Conference in Nur-Sultan, Kazakhstan was signed on 30 October 2019. The Ministerial Conference was scheduled for 8–11 June 2020, but was postponed and took place in June 2022 in Geneva, Switzerland, due to the COVID-19 pandemic. It ran from 12 to 17 June 2022: although it was initially scheduled to end on 15 June, the meeting was extended by two days to allow more time for negotiations.

=== Thirteenth ministerial conference ===
Two proposals were received to host the thirteenth Ministerial Conference, from Cameroon and from the United Arab Emirates (UAE). It took place in Abu Dhabi, United Arab Emirates, from 26 February to 2 March 2024, and was chaired by Thani bin Ahmed Al Zeyoudi, the UAE's Minister of State for Foreign Trade. A concluding Ministerial Declaration was issued on the final day of the conference.

=== Fourteenth ministerial conference ===
The WTO's 14th Ministerial Conference took place in Yaoundé, Cameroon from 26 March to 29 March 2026.

== Doha Round ==
The WTO launched the current round of negotiations, the Doha Development Agenda (DDA) or Doha Round, at the Fourth Ministerial Conference in Doha, Qatar in November 2001. The Doha round was to be an ambitious effort to make globalization more inclusive and help the world's poor, particularly by slashing barriers and subsidies in farming. The initial agenda comprised both further trade liberalization and new rule-making, underpinned by commitments to strengthen substantial assistance to developing countries.

The negotiations have been highly contentious and agreement has not been reached, despite the intense negotiations at several Ministerial Conferences and at other sessions. As of 2008, disagreements still continued over several key areas including agriculture subsidies.

GATT and WTO trade rounds
Name	Start	Duration	Countries	Subjects covered	Achievements
(Switzerland) Geneva	April 1947	7 months	23	Tariffs	Signing of GATT, 45,000 tariff concessions affecting $10 billion of trade
(France) Annecy	April 1949	5 months	34	Tariffs	Countries exchanged some 5,000 tariff concessions
(United Kingdom) Torquay	September 1950	8 months	34	Tariffs	Countries exchanged some 8,700 tariff concessions, cutting the 1948 tariff levels by 25%
(Switzerland) Geneva II	January 1956	5 months	22	Tariffs, admission of Japan	$2.5 billion in tariff reductions
(Switzerland) Dillon	September 1960	11 months	45	Tariffs	Tariff concessions worth $4.9 billion of world trade
(Switzerland) Kennedy	May 1964	37 months	48	Tariffs, anti-dumping	Tariff concessions worth $40 billion of world trade
(Japan) Tokyo	September 1973	74 months	102	Tariffs, non-tariff measures, "framework" agreements	Tariff reductions worth more than $300 billion achieved
Uruguay	September 1986	87 months	123	Tariffs, non-tariff measures, rules, services, intellectual property, dispute settlement, textiles, agriculture, creation of WTO, etc.	The round led to the creation of WTO, and extended the range of trade negotiations, leading to major reductions in tariffs (about 40%) and agricultural subsidies, an agreement to allow full access for textiles and clothing from developing countries, and an extension of intellectual property rights.
(Qatar) Doha	November 2001	?	159	Tariffs, non-tariff measures, agriculture, labor standards, environment, competition, investment, transparency, patents etc.	The round has not yet concluded. The last agreement to date, the Bali Package, was signed on 7 December 2013.

== See also ==
- World Bank
- International Monetary Fund
- International Trade Organization
- Bretton Woods system
