= Trade barrier =

Restrictions limiting international trade

Trade barriers are government-induced restrictions on international trade. Most trade barriers work on the same principle: the imposition of some sort of cost (money, time, bureaucracy, quota) on trade that alters the price or availability of the traded products. Barriers take the form of tariffs (which impose a financial burden on imports) and non-tariff barriers to trade (which uses other overt and covert means to restrict imports and occasionally exports). Trade barriers have been criticized for their negative impacts on consumers and their unequal applications to developing countries.

The use of trade barriers has shifted throughout history. Protectionist policies were commonplace in the mercantilist era, but a combination of industrialization and liberalization led to a shift towards free trade in the mid-to-late 19th century. The interwar period led to a regression back to protectionism, but post-WWII there was a near-universal commitment to multilateralism and the creation of international organizations that led to lower tariffs and decreased protectionism. While organizations like the World Trade Organization still provide an avenue for trade negotiations, in recent times there has been a shift away from trade openness and towards plurilateral agreements and regionalism.

== Overview ==
The merits of trade barriers are often disputed. Proponents of free trade point to the overall economic gains that result from trade via the theory of comparative advantage, while protectionists argue that trade barriers are necessary to sustain “weak” industries and create a self-sufficient economy. High-income countries tend to have fewer trade barriers than middle income countries which, in turn, tend to have fewer trade barriers than low income countries. The most common goods subject to trade barriers are on agricultural goods, textiles, and apparel.

Trade barriers can be split into two categories, tariff and non-tariff. Tariffs are taxes levied on imports, and can serve as a revenue source for a country, a protection for domestic industries, or a retaliatory measure against another state.

Non-tariff barriers take a variety of forms, including import and export licenses, quotas, subsidies, and embargoes. National firms often lobby their own governments to enact regulations that are designed to keep out foreign firms, though modern trade deals are one way to reduce these barriers to trade. Georgetown University Professor Marc L. Busch and McGill University Professor Krzysztof J. Pelc note that modern trade deals are long and complex because they usually tackle these non-tariff barriers to trade, and these barriers are often more complicated to negotiate than tariffs. Intellectual property (IP) regulations, for example, is a non-tariff barrier to trade that is difficult to regulate: developing countries see IP protections as inadequate while developing countries see the protections themselves as a barrier, creating a conflict that makes negotiation very difficult.

== Historical Trends ==
=== Pre-1914 ===
Before the emergence of liberalism in Europe, mercantilism dominated global trade from the 16th to 18th century. In this era, wealth was equated with power and military capability, and as such, any economic gain that another country experienced was seen as a loss for one’s own country. This view discouraged trade that would be mutually beneficial, believing that in some cases short-term economic sacrifices (e.g. limiting trade) were necessary for long-term security and prosperity.

Mercantilist nations aimed to promote trade surpluses, prioritizing exports and discouraging imports through the use of tariffs, colonial restrictions on trade with other nations, and other policies that limited foreign trade. According to Ronald Findlay and Kevin H. O’Rourke, "during the mercantilist era price gaps were as likely to be due to trade monopolies, pirates, and wars as to transport costs and tariffs, which are more easily quantifiable." One mercantilist-era non-tariff barrier to trade, the Navigation Acts, lasted from 1651 to 1849, restricting foreign ships from engaging in trade with any part of the British Empire–including colonies–and prohibiting imports from any non-British territory in Asia, Africa, and America.

In the 19th century, informed by Adam Smith’s theory of absolute advantage and David Ricardo’s theory of comparative advantage, supporters of free trade in Britain and Western Europe began to advocate against tariffs, duties, and other trade barriers. By 1860, Britain had both repealed the Corn Laws (a major restriction on grain imports) and entered into the Cobden–Chevalier Treaty (a bilateral free-trade agreement with France), marking a decisive shift away from protectionism and towards economic interdependence.

However, despite the overall increase in world trade driven in large part by the fall of transport costs in the mid-19th century, a global recession beginning in 1870 meant that, with the exception of the UK and Netherlands, industrialized countries had raised tariff rates and adopted protectionist policies in the years leading up to World War I.

=== Interwar Period ===
Though economic growth did continue in the years marked by World War I and II, a rise in transportation costs, tariffs, and protectionism meant that world trade slowed significantly. From 1913 to 1937 trade per capita had only grown at an average of 3% per decade compared to a rate of 34% from 1881 to 1913. The trust in liberal, free trade economic interdependence to maintain peace had been broken, and industrial nations abandoned previous policies of economic openness.

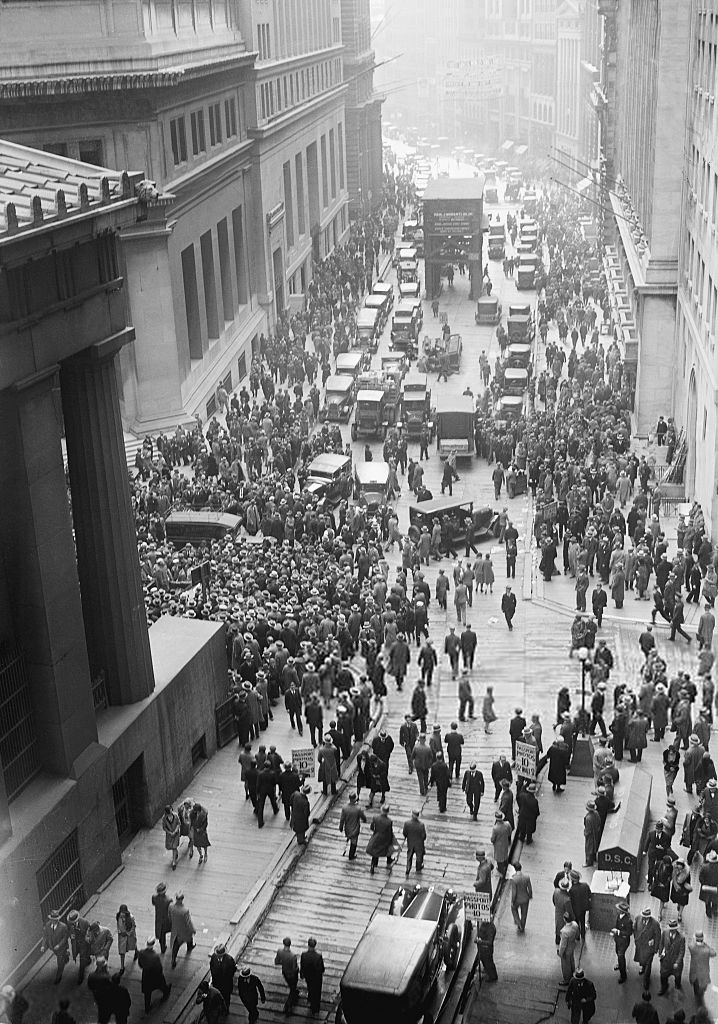
The crowd outside the Stock Exchange following the market crash.

The political and economic instability that characterized the interwar period was compounded by the Wall Street crash of 1929 and the subsequent global economic depression. From 1929 to 1932, global import and export volume fell by 30%, in large part due to tariff and non-tariff barriers to trade, decrease in demand, and exchange rate policies. While the relative weight of these factors is somewhat disputed, many scholars point specifically to tariffs to explain this trend, with one study attributing 41% of the fall in world trade to increased trade barriers.

Influential tariff policies of this time period included the Smoot–Hawley Tariff and the British Importation Act of 1931, followed by the Import Duties Act of 1932. Though the Fordney–McCumber Tariff of 1922 meant that tariff rates in the United States were already high, in 1930 congress passed the Smoot–Hawley Tariff, which quickly led to retributions against US exports from the rest of the world, especially when the US began to alter their status as an international creditor, withdrawing on and failing to offer new international loans.

In 1932, however, with the election of Franklin D. Roosevelt, US trade policy began to shift once again. In 1934, under his presidency, the Reciprocal Trade Agreement Act (RTAA) was passed, legislation that shifted trade control from the congress to the president by allowing the executive to adjust Smoot–Hawley Tariff levels by up to 50% in trade negotiations. While protectionism still dominated global politics, the RTAA and the resulting twenty-one reciprocal most-favored-nation trade agreements over the next five years set the stage for post World War II trade liberalization.

=== Post-World War II ===
If the interwar period is defined by protectionism and the increase of trade barriers, then the era post-World War II is marked by an increased commitment to liberalism, free trade, and the evolution of an international rules-based order. The RTAA not only laid the foundations for global trade liberalization, but it also put the United States as a leader of that push. Unlike the pre-1914 era of liberalization, this new era of lowered trade barriers was created in tandem with international organizations meant to support the development of freer trade.

The 1944 Bretton Woods Conference and the subsequent creation of the International Monetary Fund and the World Bank was the first step in the establishment of an international commitment to multilateralism. This did not mean progress towards free trade was linear, however. In 1948, the United States–who had been a lead advocate for international laws regulating trade–failed to ratify participation in the International Trade Organization (ITO), which would have regulated barriers to trade, including “tariff and nontariff barriers, restrictive business practices, economic reconstruction and development, and intergovernmental commodity agreements.”

The trade barrier rules and tariff concessions that had been drafted before the establishment of the ITO remained in the form of the General Agreement on Tariffs and Trade (GATT). After the formation of the ITO failed, GATT was “transformed from a temporary agreement into a normative institutional framework in which governments pursued multilateral regulation and discussed trade policy.” Though countries were still able to pursue their own domestic economic interests, GATT regulated trade barriers–both tariff and non-tariff–by establishing norms and principles of nondiscrimination, reciprocity, and liberalization.

The GATT, over a long series of negotiation rounds, significantly reduced tariffs on industrial goods and in 1979 also began to regulate non-tariff barriers such as subsidies, technical standards, and import licensing procedures during the Tokyo Round. These regulations–both on tariff and non-tariff barriers–were not without exemptions, however. Developing countries received special and differential treatment (SDT) through exemptions to the most-favored-nation principle (MFN) when it came to exports to wealthy market exports in order to help them compete; governments have the ability to raise tariffs short-term if a certain industry is struggling; measures that protect the environment, public health, or moral standards are also permitted as exceptions to reciprocity and liberalization.

A map of WTO members (green/blue), observers (yellow), and non-members (red).

Though the GATT was able to function well enough to successfully lower trade barriers through negotiation rounds, it lacked an institutional structure. The Uruguay Round, which lasted from 1987-1994, resulted in the establishment of the World Trade Organization (WTO), which established GATT principles within an institutional structure. The WTO adopted a number of new agreements, including TRIPS, SPS, and TBT, streamlined the dispute process, and imposed legally binding compliance obligations. The creation of the WTO was a further enshrinement of principles of trade liberalization, international cooperation, and the lowering of trade barriers within the international economy.

In recent years, especially in the United States, there has been a decisive shift away from a wholly liberal rules-based order and towards protectionism and smaller scale Regional Trade Agreements. Tariffs declined in use as the influence of the World Trade Organization grew, but this shrinkage was accompanied by the rise of non-tariff barriers. The WTO’s Doha Development Round failure after over a decade of attempted negotiations led states to begin to regulate trade on a regional and plurilateral basis as opposed to a multilateral one. Additionally, the 2008 financial crisis and the subsequent effects on the global economy sparked a wariness of the economic interdependence that resulted from free trade, leading to increases in populist nationalism, decreased flow of global capital, and over 7,000 worldwide trade-reductive policies enacted since 2008. In the United States, both of Trump’s presidential terms have been marked by protectionist policies: the trade war with China in his first term and the dramatic increase in tariffs across the board in his second.

== Impacts ==
=== On consumers ===
Trade barriers can serve to both help and harm consumers. On one hand, trade barriers can ensure health, safety, and environmental standards on imported goods, overall increasing the quality of available products. However, the economic impact of trade barriers–both tariff and non-tariff–is usually detrimental to consumers. Lee and Swagel identify that the “benefits of trade protection typically accrue to a narrow group of stakeholders in the protected industry, whereas what costs are spread out over a much larger number of consumers.” While the costs, when spread out, are small on an individual level, it is still a cost that consumers must bear.

=== On the Global South ===
Trade barriers are often criticized for the unequal effects they have on the developing world. Some critical theorists identify patterns of trade imbalances resulting from colonial trade that still exist today, where developing countries “are heavily reliant on exports of primary products, while high-value activities are mainly carried out in the Global North.” Additionally, GATT and WTO negotiations often favor wealthy, powerful countries: until the Uruguay Round, markets of interest to developing countries, such as textiles and agriculture, went largely unaddressed by trade negotiations. Even after the Uruguay round, goods that developing countries are most efficient at producing still face higher levels of protection from the North than other non-agricultural products.

Trade barriers such as tariffs on food imports or subsidies for farmers in developed economies lead to overproduction and dumping on world markets, thus lowering world prices to the disadvantage of farmers in developing economies. Additionally, Bernhardt identifies the use of tariffs to discourage developing countries from processing their own agricultural products, with “Canada, the EU, and Japan, for example, charg[ing] tariffs of 42, 24, and 65%, respectively, on fully processed food items but only 3, 15, and 35%, respectively, on the least processed products in this sector.” The Commitment to Development Index measures the effect that rich country trade policies actually have on the developing world.

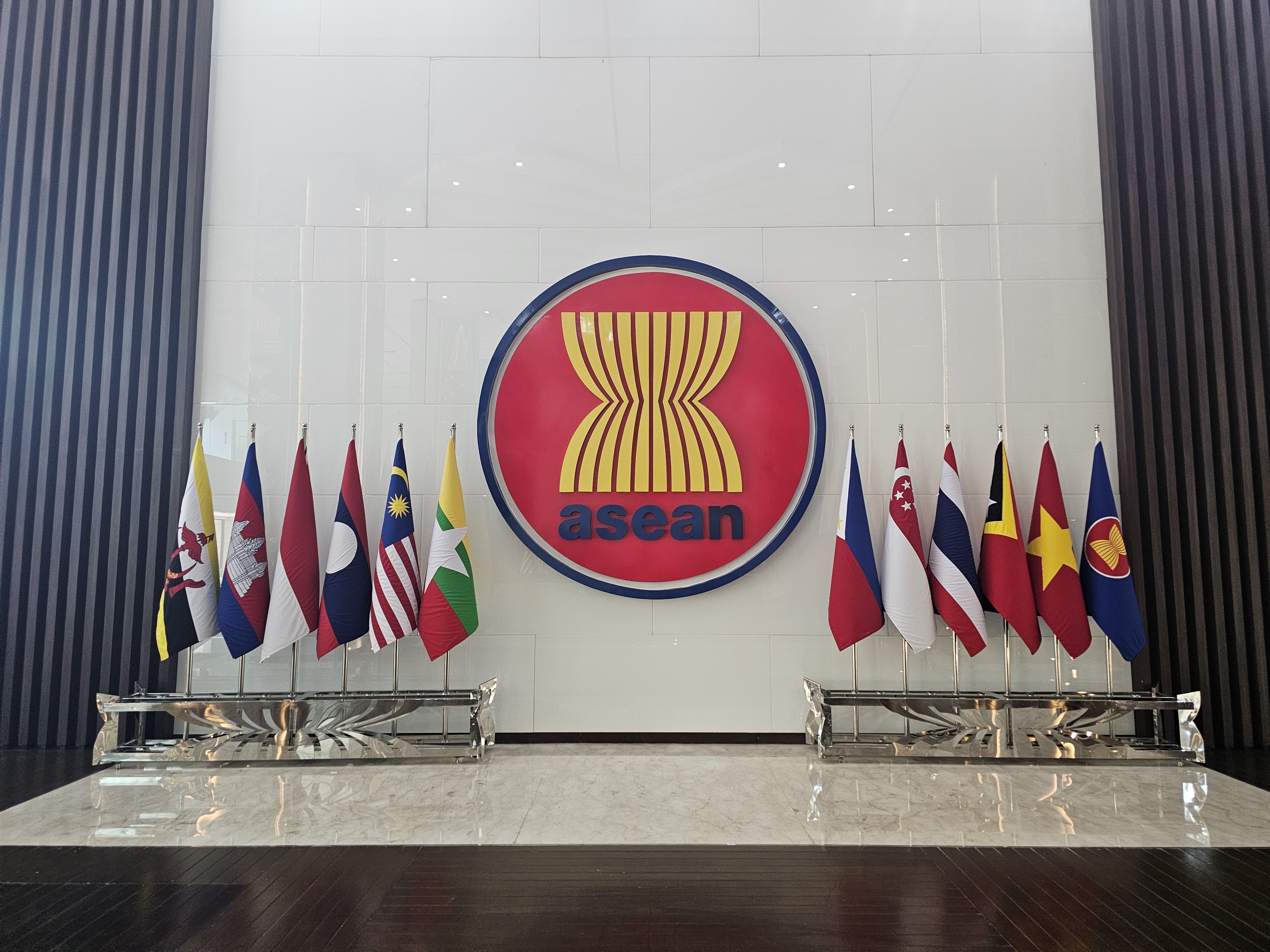
The lobby of the new ASEAN headquarters.

Though the WTO attempted to remedy some of these imbalances through the Doha Development Round beginning in 2001, with agenda items including agriculture and implementation issues with it being widely understood that this was a round that was meant to help developing nations. However, the negotiations were officially declared to be at an impasse in 2011 when major powers refused to make important concessions, especially on agriculture. As a result of these attitudes from wealthy nations, many countries in the Global South turned towards regionalism, forming coalitions such as ASEAN and Mercosur that help bolster economic growth and build networks not beholden to the interests of wealthier economies.

== See also ==
- Agricultural policy – Laws relating to domestic agriculture and foreign-imported agricultural products
- Blockade – Prevention of trade or movement by force
- Customs union – Type of trade bloc with a free trade area and common external tariff
- Denied trade screening – Screening parties to an export transaction
- Economic sanction – Financial penalties applied by nations
- Free economic zone (includes Free Port).
- Free trade – Absence of government restriction on international trade
- Free-trade area – a region encompassing a trade bloc whose member countries have signed a free trade agreement. Such agreements involve cooperation between at least two countries to reduce trade barriers, import quotas and tariffs, and to increase trade of goods and services with each other.
  - North American Free Trade Agreement (NAFTA)
  - South Asia Free Trade Agreement (SAFTA)
  - European Free Trade Association
  - European Single Market
  - Union of South American Nations
  - New West Partnership (An internal free-trade zone in Canada between Alberta, British Columbia, and Saskatchewan)
  - Gulf Cooperation Council common market
- Regional lockout – Type of digital rights management
- Non-tariff barriers to trade, such as:
  - Voluntary Export Restraints
  - Currency devaluation
  - Trade restriction
