= Trade war =

Economic conflict using tariffs or other trade barriers

A trade war is an economic conflict often resulting from extreme protectionism, in which states raise or implement tariffs or other trade barriers against each other as part of their commercial policies, in response to similar measures imposed by the opposing party. If tariffs are the exclusive mechanism, then such conflicts are known as customs wars, toll wars, or tariff wars; as a reprisal, the latter state may also increase the tariffs. Trade war arises only if the competitive protection between states is of the same type and it is not valid in case of dumping exports. Increased protection causes both nations' output compositions to move towards their autarky position. Minor trade disagreements are often called trade disputes when the war metaphor is hyperbolic.

Trade wars could be escalated to full conflict between states as evidenced in the Massacre of the Bandanese after alleged violations of a new treaty. The First Anglo-Dutch War was triggered by disputes over trade; the war began with English attacks on Dutch merchant shipping but expanded to vast fleet actions. The Second Anglo-Dutch War was for control over the seas and trade routes, where England tried to end the Dutch domination of world trade during a period of intense European commercial rivalry. The Fourth Anglo-Dutch War started over British and Dutch disagreements on the legality and conduct of Dutch trade with Britain's enemies in that war. The Shimonoseki Campaign after unrest over the shogunate's open-door policy to foreign trade. The First Opium War which started after the Qing government blockaded its ports, confiscated opium contraband and confined British traders, resulted in the dispatch of the British Navy to China and engage the Chinese Navy in the Battle of Kowloon. The First Opium War eventually led to the British colony of Hong Kong, and the Second Opium War, which arose from another trade war with the same underlying causes, expanded the British possessions on the island.

== Examples from the 1920s ==
=== German–Polish customs war ===
One example of a modern tariff war occurred in the 1920s and 1930s between the Weimar Republic (Germany) and Poland, in the German–Polish customs war of 1925 to 1934. In the Weimar Republic, Gustav Stresemann (Minister of Foreign Affairs from 1923 to 1929) wanted to force Poland to give up territory by creating an economic crisis; to achieve this, the Germans increased tolls on coal and steel products developed there.

As a reprisal, the Poles increased toll rates for many German products. This led to the rapid development of the port of Gdynia, which was the only way Poland could export its goods to Western Europe without having to transport them through Germany.

=== The U.S. Fordney–McCumber Tariff ===
U.S. President Warren G. Harding signed the Fordney–McCumber Tariff bill (named after Joseph Fordney, chair of the House Ways and Means Committee, and Porter McCumber, chair of the Senate Finance Committee) in September 1922. In the end, the tariff law raised the average American ad valorem tariff rate to 38 percent.

Trading partners complained immediately. Those injured by World War I said that, without access for their exports to the American market, they would not be able to make payments to America on war-time loans. But others saw that this tariff increase would have broader deleterious effects. Democratic Representative Cordell Hull said, "Our foreign markets depend both on the efficiency of our production and the tariffs of countries in which we would sell. Our own [high] tariffs are an important factor in each. They injure the former and invite the latter."

Five years after the passage of the tariff, the U.S.'s trading partners had raised their own tariffs by a significant degree. France raised its tariffs on automobiles from 45% to 100%, Spain raised tariffs on American goods by 40%, and Germany and Italy raised tariffs on wheat. This customs war is sometimes cited as one of the causes of the Great Depression.

== Dispute settlement mechanisms ==
- Compromis
- Economic integration
  - European Economic Community, predecessor of the European Union
  - EU–UK Trade and Cooperation Agreement (post-Brexit)
- Free trade agreements
  - Free-trade areas
  - List of multilateral free-trade agreements
- GATT (General Agreement on Tariffs and Trade) (1947–present; modified by WTO formation in 1994–1995)
- World Trade Organization, created in the 1990s to avoid customs wars, which are counterproductive in net effect
  - History of the World Trade Organization (1990s-present, after decades of efforts to fill the vacuum of the absence of such an institution)
  - Dispute settlement in the World Trade Organization
    - Dispute Settlement Body of the WTO
  - List of WTO dispute settlement cases
- International Centre for Settlement of Investment Disputes
- Investor-state dispute settlement
- Trade and Investment Framework Agreement
- TRIPS Agreement
- United Nations Commission on International Trade Law

== List of trade wars or trade disputes ==
=== Pre-20th century ===
- Anglo-Spanish Wars (1568–1807)
- Anglo-French Wars (1100–1815)
- Anglo-Dutch Wars (1652–1784)
- Opium Wars (1839–1860)
- Byzantine–Bulgarian war (894-896)

=== 20th century ===
- Japan–Korea disputes (1876–1945)
- Banana Wars (1898–1934)
- Pig War (1906–1908), a trade war between the Kingdom of Serbia and Austria-Hungary
- German–Polish customs war (1925–1934), a trade war between the Second Polish Republic and the Weimar Republic
- Smoot–Hawley Tariff Act (1930), a United States Act implementing protectionist trade policies
- Anglo-Irish trade war (1932–1938)
- Chicken War (1960s), U.S. versus European Economic Community

=== 21st century ===
- Tuna-Dolphin GATT Case (I and II), part of a larger tuna trade war (1970s–present) – US vs.Mexico
- Canada–United States softwood lumber dispute (1982–present)
- Beef hormone controversy (Beef War) (1989–2008) – US vs. EU
- Canada–Australia salmon trade dispute (1995–2000)
- Japanese Sound Recording Trade Disputes (1996–1997) – Japan vs. US & EU
- Catfish Dispute (2001–present) – U.S. versus Vietnam
- Brazil–United States cotton dispute (2002–2014)
- US–Mexico Trade Dispute – Stainless Steel Sheets and Coils dumping (2006–2009)
- EC-IT product dispute (2008–2010) – Japan vs. EU
- Milk War (2009) – Russia vs. Belarus
- Trade war over genetically modified food (2010–2011)
- South Africa–Brazil Frozen Chicken Trade Dispute (2012)
- Argentina–United States lemon dispute (2012)
- Rare earths trade dispute (2012–2015) – US vs. China
- Russian embargo of Ukrainian goods (2013–present)
- Mexico–United States sugarcane trade dispute (2014)
- Australia–China trade war, (2020–2024)
- Canada–China trade war, (2024–2026)
- Tariffs in the first Trump administration (2018 US–Canada trade dispute)
- Japan–South Korea trade dispute (2019–2023)
- China–United States trade war (2018–present)
- Tariffs in the second Trump administration (2025–present)
  - 2025–2026 Canada–United States trade war (2025–present)
  - 2025–2026 Mexico–United States trade war (2025–present)

== See also ==
- Balance of trade
- Currency war
- Economic sanctions
- Economic warfare
- Trade barrier
- Water conflict
- Country of origin

== Bibliography ==
- Rothgeb, John (2001). U.S. Trade Policy. Washington D.C.: CQ Press. ISBN 1-56802-522-X.
- Smoot-Hawley Tariff Act. (2005). Encyclopædia Britannica. Retrieved October 15, 2005, from Encyclopædia Britannica Online
- Perju, Genoveva Elena, Retaliatory Disagreement Point with Asymmetric Countries: Evidence from European Wine Sector During Enlargement (June 15, 2009). Available at SSRN: SSRN 1435993 or http://dx.doi.org/10.2139/ssrn.1435993
