= Blair House Agreement =

The Blair House Agreement was the November 1992 agreement between the United States and the European Union on export subsidy and domestic subsidy reduction commitments in the Uruguay Round of multilateral trade negotiations. The agreement also dealt with some bilateral agricultural trade issues.

== See also ==
- Blair House
- European Union–United States relations
