= Currency Exchange Rate Oversight Reform Act of 2011 =

American international trade bill

The Currency Exchange Rate Oversight Reform Act of 2011 (S. 1619) is an international trade bill in the 112th United States Congress that would establish US tariffs on imports from countries with undervalued currencies. The bill was approved by the Senate on October 11, 2011, by a vote of 63–35, with no vote yet coming from the House of Representatives. The bill calls for the Treasury Department to identify countries whose currencies are undervalued, and then instruct the Commerce Department to impose duties on imports from those aforementioned countries.

== Background ==
In 2010, the United States had a $270 billion trade deficit with China (Chinese imports totalling $360 billion compared to only $90 billion in American exports) in part to what most U.S. economists warn as an undervaluation of the Chinese currency, Yuan, which in turn gives its exporters a significant advantage in the global economy.

== China's response ==
China stated that this legislation, if passed, could spark a trade war. China has also cited Statistics that its currency has appreciated thirty percent in value relative to the dollar since 2005. Additionally, they point to Federal Reserve Chairman Ben Bernanke's Quantitative Easing (such as QE1 and QE2) to being the same type of American government devaluation of currency for which it is unduly accusing China.

== Legislative history ==
The legislation passed 63–35 in the senate mostly along party lines with most democrats and 16 republicans voting for it and most republicans and 5 democrats voting against it. The legislation was tabled in the house of representative, where it has received little attention in the 2011 session.
