= Agreement on Trade-Related Investment Measures =

One of the four principal legal agreements of the WTO trade treaty

The Agreement on Trade-Related Investment Measures (TRIMs) are rules that are applicable to the domestic regulations a country applies to foreign investors, often as part of an industrial policy. The agreement, concluded in 1994, was negotiated under the WTO's predecessor, the General Agreement on Tariffs and Trade (GATT), and came into force in 1995. The agreement was agreed upon by all members of the World Trade Organization. Trade-Related Investment Measures is one of the four principal legal agreements of the WTO trade treaty.

TRIMs are rules that restrict preference of domestic firms and thereby enable international firms to operate more easily within foreign markets. Policies such as local content requirements and trade balancing rules that have traditionally been used to both promote the interests of domestic industries and combat restrictive business practices are now banned.

== Origin ==
In the late 1980s, there was a significant increase in foreign direct investment across the world. However, some of the countries receiving foreign investment imposed numerous restrictions on that investment designed to protect and foster domestic industries, and to prevent the outflow of foreign exchange reserves.

Examples of these restrictions include local content requirements (which require that locally produced goods be purchased or used), manufacturing requirements (which require the domestic manufacturing of certain components), trade balancing requirements, domestic sales requirements, technology transfer requirements, export performance requirements (which require the export of a specified percentage of production volume), local equity restrictions, foreign exchange restrictions, remittance restrictions, licensing requirements, and employment restrictions. These measures can also be used in connection with fiscal incentives as opposed to requirement. Some of these investment measures distort trade in violation of GATT Articles III and XI, and are therefore prohibited.

Until the completion of the Uruguay Round negotiations, which produced a well-rounded Agreement on Trade-Related Investment Measures (hereinafter the "TRIMs Agreement"), the few international agreements providing disciplines for measures restricting foreign investment provided only limited guidance in terms of content and country coverage. The OECD Code on Liberalization of Capital Movements, for example, requires members to liberalize restrictions on direct investment in a range of areas. The OECD Code's efficacy, however, is limited by the numerous reservations made by each of the members.

In addition, there are other international treaties, bilateral and multilateral, under which signatories extend most-favored-nation treatment to direct investment. Only a few such treaties, however, provide national treatment for direct investment. The Asia-Pacific Economic Cooperation Investment Principles adopted in November 1994 are general rules for investment but they are non- binding.

== See also ==
- Bilateral Investment Treaty
