= End-use certificate =

End-use certificate — The North American Free Trade Agreement Implementation Act (P.L. 103-182) mandates end-use requirements for wheat and barley imported from any country requiring end-use certificates for imports of U.S. produced commodities. Canada is the only nation that requires such certificates, and U.S. wheat is the only commodity subject to the restriction. Regulations implementing the End-Use Certificate Program, implemented February 27, 1995, are found at 7 CFR 782.

== See also ==
- Trade barrier
