= Trade dispute =

Trade dispute may mean:

- Labor dispute, a disagreement between an employer and employees regarding the terms of employment
- Trade war, an economic conflict between nations over the trade of the nations' goods, services, and/or citizenry
