= Multilateral trade negotiations =

The term multilateral trade negotiations (MTN) initially applied to negotiations between General Agreement on Tariffs and Trade (GATT) member nations conducted under the auspices of the GATT and aimed at reducing tariff and nontariff trade barriers. In 1995 the World Trade Organization (WTO) replaced the GATT as the administrative body. A current round of multilateral trade negotiations was conducted in the Doha Development Agenda round.

Prior to the ongoing Doha Development Round, eight GATT sessions took place:

- 1st Round: Geneva Round, 1947
- 2nd Round: Annecy Round, 1949
- 3rd Round: Torquay Round, 1950-51
- 4th Round: Geneva Round, 1955-56
- 5th Round: Dillon Round, 1960-61
- 6th Round: Kennedy Round, 1963-67
- 7th Round: Tokyo Round, 1973-79
- 8th Round: Uruguay Round, 1986-94

The third WTO Ministerial Conference in Seattle, 1999, was intended to start the Millennium Round of negotiations.
