= Member states of the World Trade Organization =

The original members of the World Trade Organization are the parties to the General Agreement on Tariffs and Trade (GATT) after ratifying the Uruguay Round Agreements, and the European Communities. They obtained this status at the entry into force on 1 January 1995 or upon their date of ratification. All other members have joined the organization as a result of negotiation, and membership consists of a balance of rights and obligations. The process of becoming a World Trade Organization (WTO) member is unique to each applicant country, and the terms of accession are dependent upon the country's stage of economic development and the current trade regime.

An offer of accession is given once consensus is reached among members. The process takes about five years, on average, but it can take some countries almost a decade if the country is less than fully committed to the process, or if political issues interfere. The shortest accession negotiation was that of Kyrgyzstan, lasting 2 years and 10 months. The longest were that of Russia, lasting 19 years and 2 months, Vanuatu, lasting 17 years and 1 month, Comoros, lasting 16 years and 10 months, and China, lasting 15 years and 5 months.

As of 2007, WTO members represented 96.4% of global trade and 96.7% of global GDP. Iran, followed by Iraq and Algeria, are the economies with the largest GDP and trade outside the WTO, using 2005 data.

== Accession process ==
WTO accession progress: Draft Working Party Report or Factual Summary adopted Goods and/or Services offers submitted Working party meetings Memorandum on Foreign Trade Regime submitted Working party established

A country wishing to accede to the WTO submits an application to the General Council. The government applying for membership has to describe all aspects of its trade and economic policies that have a bearing on WTO agreements. The application is submitted to the WTO in a memorandum which is examined by a working party open to all interested WTO Members, and dealing with the country's application. For large countries such as Russia, numerous countries participate in this process. For smaller countries, the Quadrilateral group of members—consisting of Canada, the European Union, Japan, and the United States—and an applicant's neighboring countries are typically most involved. The applicant then presents a detailed memorandum to the Working Party on its foreign trade regime, describing, among other things, its economy, economic policies, domestic and international trade regulations, and intellectual property policies. The Working Party Members submit written questions to the applicant to clarify aspects of its foreign trade regime with particular attention being paid to the degree of privatization in the economy and the extent to which government regulation is transparent. After all necessary background information has been acquired, the Working Party will begin meeting to focus on issues of discrepancy between the WTO rules and the Applicant's international and domestic trade policies and laws. The WP determines the terms and conditions of entry into the WTO for the applicant nation, and may consider transitional periods to allow countries some leeway in complying with the WTO rules.

The final phase of accession involves bilateral negotiations between the applicant nation and other Working Party members regarding the concessions and commitments on tariff levels and market access for goods and services. These talks cover tariff rates and specific market access commitments, and other policies in goods and services. The new member's commitments are to apply equally to all WTO members under normal non-discrimination rules, even though they are negotiated bilaterally. In other words, the talks determine the benefits (in the form of export opportunities and guarantees) other WTO members can expect when the new member joins. The talks can be highly complicated; it has been said that in some cases the negotiations are almost as large as an entire round of multilateral trade negotiations.

When the bilateral talks conclude, the working party finalizes the terms of accession, sends an accession package, which includes a summary of all the WP meetings, the Protocol of Accession (a draft membership treaty), and lists ("schedules") of the member-to-be's commitments to the General Council or Ministerial Conference. Once the General Council or Ministerial Conference approves of the terms of accession, the applicant's parliament must ratify the Protocol of Accession before it can become a member. The documents used in the accession process which are embargoed during the accession process are released once the nation becomes a member.

== Members and observers ==
A world map of WTO participation: Members Members, dually represented with the European Union Observers Non-members

As of August 2024, the WTO has 166 members. Of the 128 states party to GATT at the end of 1994, all have since become WTO members except for the Socialist Federal Republic of Yugoslavia, which had dissolved in 1992 and was suspended from participating in GATT at the time. Four other states, China, Lebanon, Liberia, and Syria, were parties to GATT but subsequently withdrew from the treaty prior to the establishment of the WTO. China and Liberia have since acceded to the WTO. The remaining WTO members acceded after first becoming WTO observers and negotiating membership.

The 27 states of the European Union are dually represented, as the EU is a full member of the organization. Other autonomous entities are eligible for full membership in the WTO provided that they have a separate customs territory with full autonomy in the conduct of their external commercial relations. Thus, Hong Kong became a GATT contracting party, by the now terminated "sponsorship" procedure of the United Kingdom (Hong Kong uses the name "Hong Kong, China" since 1997), as did Macao. A new member of this type is the Republic of China (Taiwan), which acceded to the WTO in 2002, and carefully crafted its application by joining under the name "Separate Customs Territory of Taiwan, Penghu, Kinmen and Matsu (Chinese Taipei)" so that they were not rejected as a result of the One China principle implemented by the People's Republic of China.

Until 1969, an official list of territories to which the General Agreement applied was periodically compiled and updated. However, the practice was abandoned following controversies stemming from territorial disputes.

The WTO also has 23 observer states, that with the exception of the Holy See must start their accession negotiations within five years of becoming observers. The last country admitted as observer-only before applying for full membership was Equatorial Guinea in 2002, but since 2007 it is also in full membership negotiations. In 2007 Liberia and Comoros applied directly for full membership. Some international intergovernmental organizations are also granted observer status to WTO bodies. The Palestinian Authority submitted a request for WTO observer status in October 2009 and again in April 2010.

Timor-Leste is the newest member, joining effective 30 August 2024.

Russia was one of the only two large economies outside of the WTO after Saudi Arabia joined in 2005. It had begun negotiating to join the WTO's predecessor in 1993. The final major point of contention—related to the 2006 Russian ban of Moldovan and Georgian wines and the 2008 Russo-Georgian War—was solved through mediation by Switzerland, leading to Russian membership in 2012. The other is Iran, which is an observer state and began negotiations in 1996.

A membership offer requires a two-thirds majority vote among existing members, while the granting of observer status requires a simple majority. Observers have speaking rights after members have spoken, but not the right to submit proposals or voting rights.

== List of members and accession dates ==
The following table lists all current members, their accession date and previous GATT membership, of which there were 128 nations when the transformation was consummated.

State	Date of accession	GATT membership
Afghanistan (Note: Referred to as the Islamic Republic of Afghanistan as of 2024.)	29 July 2016	
Albania	8 September 2000	
Angola	23 November 1996	8 April 1994
Antigua and Barbuda	1 January 1995	30 March 1987
Argentina	1 January 1995	11 October 1967
Armenia	5 February 2003	
Australia (Note: Applicable to its dependent territories.)	1 January 1995	1 January 1948
Austria (Note: Member state of the European Union.)	1 January 1995	19 October 1951
Bahrain	1 January 1995	13 December 1993
Bangladesh	1 January 1995	16 December 1972
Barbados	1 January 1995	15 February 1967
Belgium	1 January 1995	1 January 1948
Belize	1 January 1995	7 October 1983
Benin	22 February 1996	12 September 1963
Bolivia	12 September 1995	8 September 1990
Botswana	31 May 1995	28 August 1987
Brazil	1 January 1995	30 July 1948
Brunei	1 January 1995	9 December 1993
Bulgaria (Note: Member state of the European Union since 2007.)	1 December 1996	
Burkina Faso	3 June 1995	3 May 1963
Burundi	23 July 1995	13 March 1965
Cambodia	13 October 2004	
Cameroon	13 December 1995	3 May 1963
Canada	1 January 1995	1 January 1948
Cape Verde	23 July 2008	
Central African Republic	31 May 1995	3 May 1963
Chad	19 October 1996	12 July 1963
Chile	1 January 1995	16 March 1949
China	11 December 2001	
Colombia	30 April 1995	3 October 1981
Comoros	21 August 2024	
Congo, Democratic Republic of the	1 January 1997	11 September 1971
Congo, Republic of the	27 March 1997	3 May 1963
Costa Rica	1 January 1995	24 November 1990
Côte d'Ivoire	1 January 1995	31 December 1963
Croatia (Note: Member state of the European Union since 2013.)	30 November 2000	
Cuba	20 April 1995	1 January 1948
Cyprus (Note: Member state of the European Union since 2004.)	30 July 1995	15 July 1963
Czech Republic	1 January 1995	15 April 1993
Denmark (Note: Applicable to the Faroe Islands and Greenland.)	1 January 1995	28 May 1950
Djibouti	31 May 1995	16 December 1994
Dominica	1 January 1995	20 April 1993
Dominican Republic	9 March 1995	19 May 1950
Ecuador	21 January 1996	
Egypt	30 June 1995	9 May 1970
El Salvador	7 May 1995	22 May 1991
Estonia	13 November 1999	
Eswatini (Note: Known as Swaziland until 2018.)	1 January 1995	8 February 1993
European Union (Note: All member countries of the European Union are also members of the WTO individually.)	1 January 1995	
Fiji	14 January 1996	16 November 1993
Finland	1 January 1995	25 May 1950
France (Note: Applicable to dependent territories including New Caledonia, French Polynesia, St. Pierre and Miquelon and Wallis and Futuna.)	1 January 1995	1 January 1948
Gabon	1 January 1995	3 May 1963
Gambia	23 October 1996	22 February 1965
Georgia	14 June 2000	
Germany	1 January 1995	1 October 1951
Ghana	1 January 1995	17 October 1957
Greece	1 January 1995	1 March 1950
Grenada	22 February 1996	9 February 1994
Guatemala	21 July 1995	10 October 1991
Guinea	25 October 1995	8 December 1994
Guinea-Bissau	31 May 1995	17 March 1994
Guyana	1 January 1995	5 July 1966
Haiti	30 January 1996	1 January 1950
Honduras	1 January 1995	10 April 1994
Hong Kong, China (Note: Official name was Hong Kong until 1997.)	1 January 1995	23 April 1986
Hungary	1 January 1995	9 September 1973
Iceland	1 January 1995	21 April 1968
India	1 January 1995	8 July 1948
Indonesia	1 January 1995	24 February 1950
Ireland	1 January 1995	22 December 1967
Israel	21 April 1995	5 July 1962
Italy	1 January 1995	30 May 1950
Jamaica	9 March 1995	31 December 1963
Japan	1 January 1995	10 September 1955
Jordan	11 April 2000	
Kazakhstan	30 November 2015	
Kenya	1 January 1995	5 February 1964
Korea, Republic of	1 January 1995	14 April 1967
Kuwait	1 January 1995	3 May 1963
Kyrgyzstan	20 December 1998	
Laos	2 February 2013	
Latvia	10 February 1999	
Lesotho	31 May 1995	8 January 1988
Liberia	14 July 2016	
Liechtenstein	1 September 1995	29 March 1994
Lithuania	31 May 2001	
Luxembourg	1 January 1995	1 January 1948
Madagascar	17 November 1995	30 September 1963
Malawi	31 May 1995	28 August 1964
Malaysia	1 January 1995	24 October 1957
Maldives	31 May 1995	19 April 1983
Mali	31 May 1995	11 January 1993
Malta	1 January 1995	17 November 1964
Macao, China (Note: Official name was Macao until 1999.)	1 January 1995	11 January 1991
Mauritania	31 May 1995	30 September 1963
Mauritius	1 January 1995	2 September 1970
Mexico	1 January 1995	24 August 1986
Moldova	26 July 2001	
Mongolia	29 January 1997	
Montenegro	29 April 2012	
Morocco	1 January 1995	17 June 1987
Mozambique	26 August 1995	27 July 1992
Myanmar	1 January 1995	29 July 1948
Namibia	1 January 1995	15 September 1992
Nepal	23 April 2004	
Netherlands (Note: Applicable to the former Netherlands Antilles and Aruba.)	1 January 1995	1 January 1948
New Zealand (Note: Applicable to Tokelau.)	1 January 1995	30 July 1948
Nicaragua	3 September 1995	28 May 1950
Niger	13 December 1996	31 December 1963
Nigeria	1 January 1995	18 November 1960
North Macedonia (Note: Known as the Republic of Macedonia until 2019.)	4 April 2003	
Norway	1 January 1995	10 July 1948
Oman	9 November 2000	
Pakistan	1 January 1995	30 July 1948
Panama	6 September 1997	
Papua New Guinea	9 June 1996	16 December 1994
Paraguay	1 January 1995	6 January 1994
Peru	1 January 1995	7 October 1951
Philippines	1 January 1995	27 December 1979
Poland	1 July 1995	18 October 1967
Portugal	1 January 1995	6 May 1962
Qatar	13 January 1996	7 April 1994
Romania	1 January 1995	14 November 1971
Russia	22 August 2012	
Rwanda	22 May 1996	1 January 1966
Saint Kitts and Nevis	21 February 1996	24 March 1994
Saint Lucia	1 January 1995	13 April 1993
Saint Vincent and the Grenadines	1 January 1995	18 May 1993
Samoa	10 May 2012	
Saudi Arabia	11 December 2005	
Senegal	1 January 1995	27 September 1963
Seychelles	26 April 2015	
Sierra Leone	23 July 1995	19 May 1961
Singapore	1 January 1995	20 August 1973
Slovakia	1 January 1995	15 April 1993
Slovenia	30 July 1995	30 October 1994
Solomon Islands	26 July 1996	28 December 1994
South Africa	1 January 1995	13 June 1948
Spain	1 January 1995	29 August 1963
Sri Lanka	1 January 1995	29 July 1948
Suriname	1 January 1995	22 March 1978
Sweden	1 January 1995	30 April 1950
Switzerland	1 July 1995	1 August 1966
Taiwan (Note: Officially uses the designation "Separate Customs Territory of Taiwan, Penghu, Kinmen and Matsu".)	1 January 2002	
Tajikistan	2 March 2013	
Tanzania	1 January 1995	9 December 1961
Thailand	1 January 1995	20 November 1982
Timor-Leste	30 August 2024	
Togo	31 May 1995	20 March 1964
Tonga	27 July 2007	
Trinidad and Tobago	1 March 1995	23 October 1962
Tunisia	29 March 1995	29 August 1990
Turkey	26 March 1995	17 October 1951
Uganda	1 January 1995	23 October 1962
Ukraine	16 May 2008	
United Arab Emirates	10 April 1996	8 March 1994
United Kingdom (Note: Former Member state of the European Union until withdrawing in 2020. Membership extended to the Isle of Man in 1997 and the Channel Islands in 2021.)	1 January 1995	1 January 1948
United States (Note: Applicable to its dependent territories.)	1 January 1995	1 January 1948
Uruguay	1 January 1995	6 December 1953
Vanuatu	24 August 2012	
Venezuela	1 January 1995	31 August 1990
Vietnam	11 January 2007	
Yemen	26 June 2014	
Zambia	1 January 1995	10 February 1982
Zimbabwe	5 March 1995	11 July 1948

== List of observers ==
The following table lists all 23 WTO observers. Within five years of being granted observer status by the WTO, states are required to begin negotiating their accession to the organization.

State	Date of membership application	Status
Algeria	3 June 1987	Inactive since 2014
Andorra	4 July 1997	Inactive since 1999
Azerbaijan	30 June 1997	Work in progress
Bahamas	10 May 2001	Inactive since 2019
Belarus	23 September 1993	Inactive since 2019
Bhutan	1 September 1999	Reactivation
Bosnia and Herzegovina	11 May 1999	Strategic focus
Curaçao	31 October 2019	Activation
Equatorial Guinea	19 February 2007	Activation
Ethiopia	13 January 2003	Strategic focus
Holy See	None (Note: The Holy See is exempted from having to negotiate full WTO membership.)	Observer since 1997
Iran	19 July 1996	Inactive since 2011
Iraq	30 September 2004	Work in progress
Lebanon (Note: Was a party to GATT prior to withdrawing.)	30 January 1999	Inactive since 2017
Libya	10 June 2004	Inactive since 2004
São Tomé and Príncipe	14 January 2005	Inactive since 2005
Serbia	23 December 2004	Inactive since 2013
Somalia	12 December 2015	Work in progress
South Sudan	5 December 2017	Inactive since 2019
Sudan	11 October 1994	Inactive since 2021
Syria	10 October 2001	Inactive since 2010
Turkmenistan (Note: Observer status granted 22 July 2020)	24 November 2021	Activation
Uzbekistan	8 December 1994	Strategic focus

== Neither members nor observers ==
The following UN member states and General Assembly observer states are neither members nor observers of the WTO:

- Eritrea
- Kiribati
- Marshall Islands
- Micronesia
- Monaco
- Nauru
- North Korea
- Palau
- Palestine
- San Marino
- Tuvalu

=== Applicants ===
- Palestine

Since 2005, UN General Assembly observer state Palestine has been granted speaking rights at each Ministerial Conference of the WTO, under the name Palestinian Authority until 2009 and under the name Palestine from 2011 onward. Palestine is not listed as an "observer government" like other observer states, and is instead listed under "other observers" in the same category as non-state observers such as the International Trade Centre and World Bank. Palestine applied for observer state status on 2 October 2009 and 12 April 2010. As of 2 December 2016, Palestine had expressed an interest in joining the WTO as a full member.

- Faroe Islands

Applied for membership in November 2025.

- African Union

On 17 November 2019, the African Union applied for observer status.

Additionally, as of 16 November 2015 Kosovo had expressed an interest in joining the WTO as a member.

== See also ==
- List of customs territories

== Bibliography and Web ==
- "Accessions Gateway". World Trade Organization.
- "Accessions News Archive". World Trade Organization.
- Aslund, Anders (21 December 2007). "Russia's WTO Accession". Speeches, Testimony, Papers. Peter G. Peterson Institute for International Politics.
- "Factsheet on U.S. – Russia WTO Bilateral Market Access Agreement". Office of the United States Trade Representative. 10 November 2007. Archived from the original on 27 April 2007.
- Farah, Paolo (August 2006). "Five Years of China WTO Membership. EU and US Perspectives about China's Compliance with Transparency Commitments and the Transitional Review Mechanism". Legal Issues of Economic Integration. 33 (3). doi:10.54648/LEIE2006016. S2CID 153128973. SSRN 916768.
- "How to Become a Member of the WTO". Accession: Explanation. World Trade Organization.
- "International Intergovernmental Organizations Granted Observer Status to WTO bodies". World Trade Organization.
- Jackson, John H. (2006). "The World Trade Organization: Structure of the Treaty and the Institution". Sovereignty, the WTO and Changing Fundamentals of International Law. Cambridge University Press. ISBN 978-0-521-86007-9.
- "Members and Observers". Understanding the WTO. World Trade Organization.
- "Membership, Alliances and Bureaucracy". Understanding the WTO. World Trade Organization.
- Michalopoulos, Constantine (2002). "WTO Accession". In Bernard M. Hoekman; Aaditya Mattoo; Philip English (eds.). Development, Trade, and the WTO: A Handbook. World Bank Publications. ISBN 978-0-8213-4997-7.
- Charnovitz, Steve (19 January 2007). "Mapping the Law of WTO Accession (by Steve Charnovitz)". SRRN. SSRN 957651.
