= Marrakesh Agreement =

April 1994 international free trade agreement signed in Marrakech, Morocco

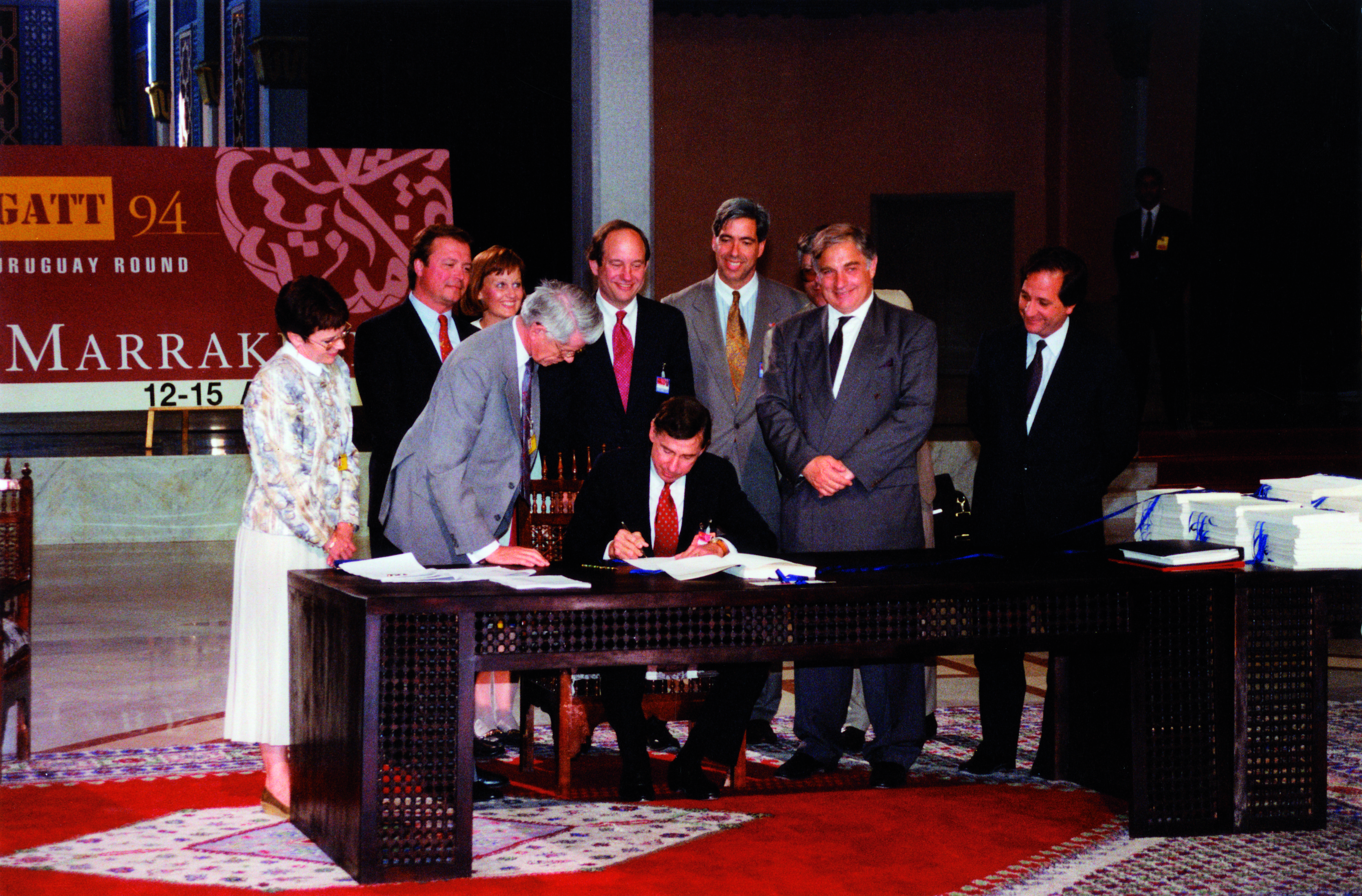
- The agreement is signed
- Type: Multilateral treaty
- Signed: 15 April 1994
- Location: Marrakesh, Morocco

The Marrakesh Agreement, manifested by the Marrakesh Declaration, was an agreement signed in Marrakesh, Morocco, by 123 nations on 15 April 1994, marking the culmination of the eight-year-long Uruguay Round and establishing the World Trade Organization, which officially came into being on 1 January 1995.

The agreement developed out of the General Agreement on Tariffs and Trade (GATT), supplemented by a number of other agreements on issues including trade in services, sanitary and phytosanitary measures, trade-related aspects of intellectual property and technical barriers to trade. It also established a new, more efficient and legally binding means of dispute resolution. The various agreements which make up the Marrakesh Agreement combine as an indivisible whole; no entity can be party to any one agreement without being party to them all.

== See also ==
- The UN Global Compact for Migration treaty, developed in Marrakesh and New York conferences in 2018
