= World Trade Organization Ministerial Conference of 2013 =

WTO trade conference in Bali, Indonesia

Ninth Ministerial Conference of the World Trade Organization

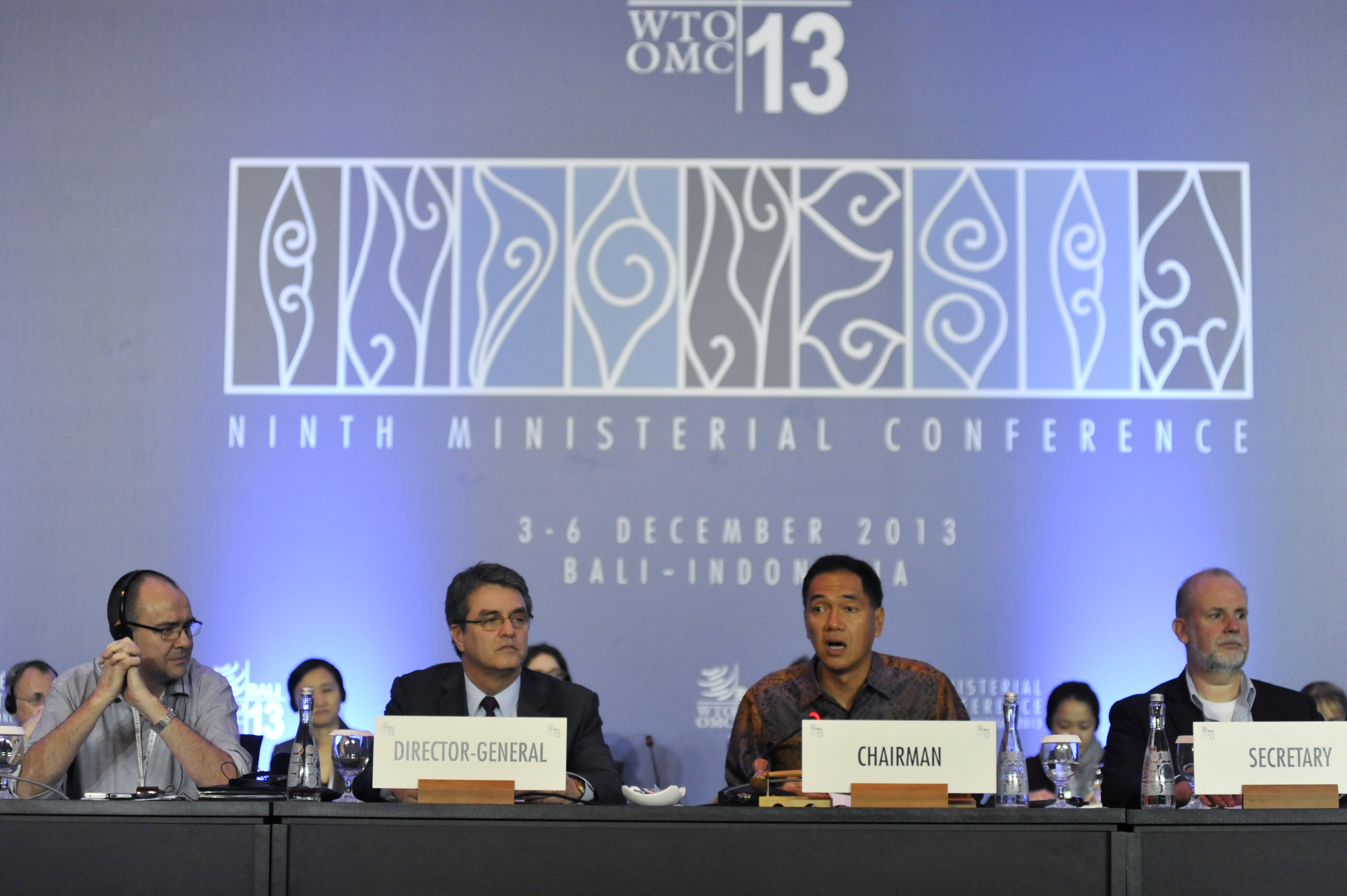
- Country: Bali, Indonesia
- Previous event: Eighth Ministerial Conference of the World Trade Organization
- Next event: Tenth Ministerial Conference of the World Trade Organization

The Ninth World Trade Organization Ministerial Conference was held in Bali, Indonesia from 3 to 7 December 2013. The conference was chaired by the Indonesian Trade Minister Gita Wirjawan.

In this conference, 159 members of World Trade Organization agreed to the Bali Package which aims to ease barriers to international trade.

Yemen's agreement was also registered, dependent on the country's membership ratification.
