= Pig War (1906–1908) =

Austria-Hungary–Kingdom of Serbia trade war

The Pig War (Serbian: Свињски рат, romanized: Svinjski rat, German: Schweinekrieg, Hungarian: Disznóháború), or Customs War (Царински рат, Carinski rat), was a trade war between Austria-Hungary and the Kingdom of Serbia in 1906 to 1908 during which the Habsburgs unsuccessfully imposed a customs blockade on Serbian pork.

== Background ==
In the early 20th century, Serbia was economically a satellite of the Habsburgs, its major export being pork, most of which was bought by Austria-Hungary. When Serbia started trying to evade economic and political control by the Habsburgs and to build links with other countries, particularly Bulgaria, Germany and France, the Hungarian government decided to punish the Serbs with economic sanctions. Specifically, in an attempt to reduce its economic dependence on Austria-Hungary, Serbia began to import French, rather than Austro-Hungarian, munitions and established a commercial treaty with Germany in 1904 and a customs union with Bulgaria in 1905 that ended the sale of tariff-laden Austrian goods in Serbia.

== History ==
Long used to setting economic policy, Austria-Hungary responded in April 1906 by closing its borders to Serbian pork. Serbia refused to bow to Vienna, gained French investment to build new packing plants for international trade, began to order materials from the Austro-Hungarian rival Germany and pressured the Austrian-administered provinces of Bosnia and Herzegovina for a trade outlet on the Adriatic Sea. That caused Austria-Hungary to concede the conflict by March 1908, as can be shown by the trade statistics of the period in question:

Foreign Trade of the Kingdom of Serbia EB1911 page 688
	1904	1905	1906	1907	1908
Exports (thousand GBP):	2,486	2,879	2,864	3,259	3,019
Imports (thousand GBP):	2,437	2,224	1,773	2,823	3,025
Trade Balance (thousand GBP):	49	655	1,091	436	-6
Exports/Imports (%): Rounded to the nearest %	102	129	162	115	100

== See also ==
- Austro–Serbian Alliance of 1881
