= World Trade Organization Ministerial Conference of 1996 =

WTO trade conference in Singapore

First Ministerial Conference of the World Trade Organization

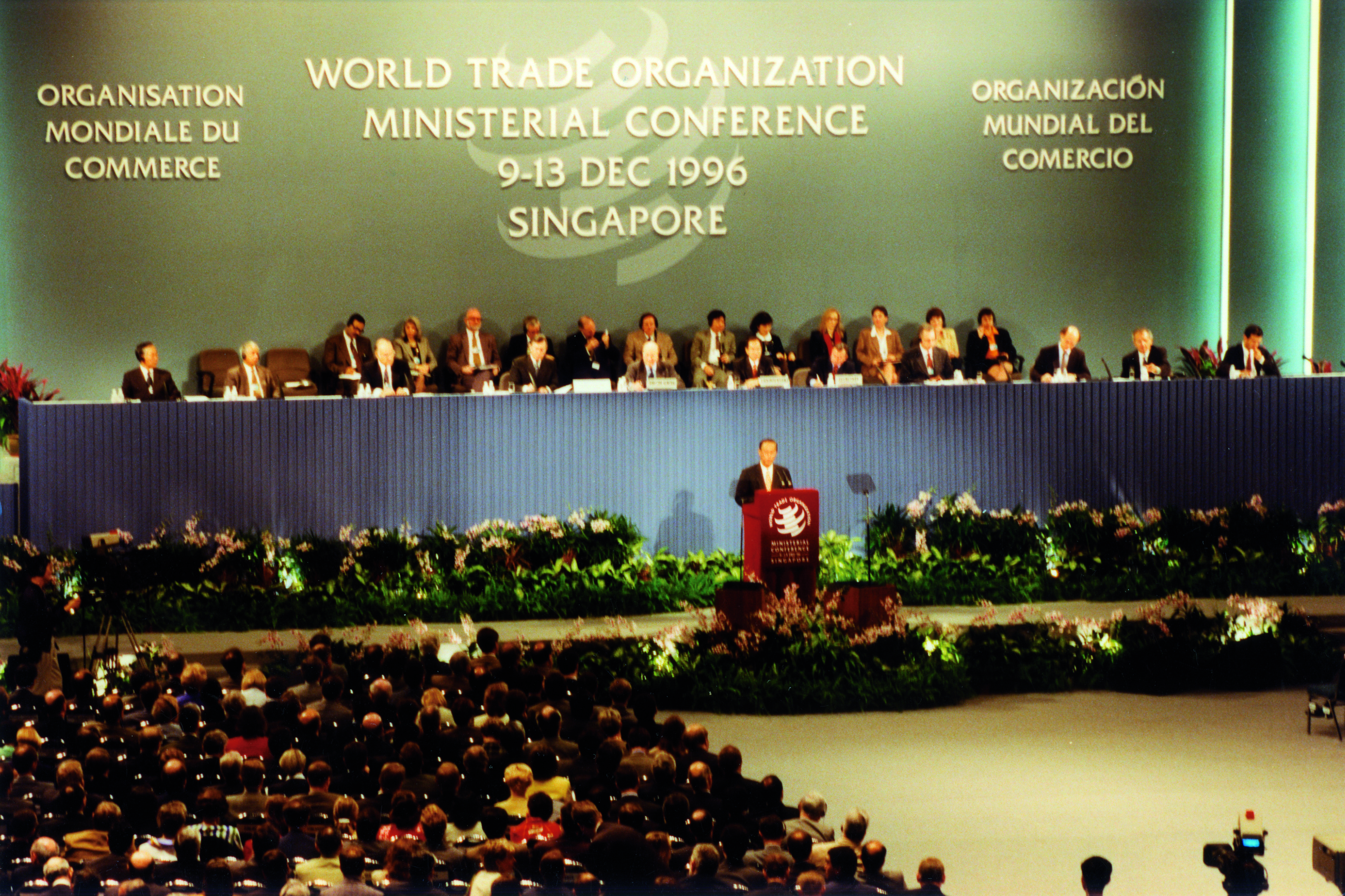
- Singapore Ministerial Conference
- Country: Singapore
- Next event: Second Ministerial Conference of the World Trade Organization

The World Trade Organization's Ministerial Conference of 1996 was held in Singapore on December 9–13, 1996. The inaugural meeting for the organisation since its formation. The event was hosted by the government of Singapore at the Singapore International Convention and Exhibition Centre in Suntec City.

The conference established four permanent working groups, covering transparency in government procurement, trade facilitation (customs issues), trade and investment, and trade and competition, and an international agreement on trade in information technology products was signed. The purpose of the first of these groups was to conduct "a study on transparency in government procurement practices, taking into account national policies and, based on this study, to develop elements for inclusion in an appropriate agreement". The topics covered by these groups collectively are called the Singapore issues.
