= Bali Package =

2013 World Trade Organization agreement

- Type: Trade agreements
- Context: Doha Development Round of the World Trade Organization
- Signed: 7 December 2013
- Location: Nusa Dua, Bali, Indonesia

The Bali Package is a trade agreement resulting from the Ninth Ministerial Conference of the World Trade Organization in Bali, Indonesia on 3–7 December 2013. It is aimed at lowering global trade barriers and is the first agreement reached through the WTO that is approved by all its members. The package forms part of the Doha Development Round, which started in 2001.

== Description ==
The accord includes provisions for lowering import tariffs and agricultural subsidies, with the intention of making it easier for developing countries to trade with the developed world in global markets. Developed countries would abolish hard import quotas on agricultural products from the developing world and instead would only be allowed to charge tariffs on amounts of agricultural imports exceeding specific limits. Another important target is reforming customs bureaucracies and formalities to facilitate trade.

The Bali Package consists of ten separate decisions by the Ministerial Conference, covering four areas as follow:

- The Trade Facilitation Agreement (TFA), active since 22 February 2017 when Rwanda, Oman, Chad and Jordan submitted their instruments of acceptance, achieving the requirement that two-thirds of the 164 WTO members formally accept the Agreement. The TFA aims to reduce red-tape and streamline customs. It will be legally binding, require some expense and a certain level of technology. The agreement reaffirms that the non-discrimination principle of Article V of GATT 1994 remains valid. Least developed countries (LDCs) will be supported in building capacities to implement the changes using funding from the Trade Facilitation Agreement Facility (TFAF), which was established on 22 July 2014 under the terms of an amendment to the TFA. Some critics worry that governments may have to prioritize funds for trade facilitation over other important areas, such as public health or education.
- Food security: General Services; Public Stockholding for Food Security Purposes; Understanding on Tariff Rate Quota Administration Provisions of Agricultural Products, as Defined in Article 2 of the Agreement on Agriculture; Export Competition
- Cotton: Subsidies for trading cotton was implemented by the WTO
- Development and LDC issues: Preferential Rules of Origin for Least-Developed Countries (simplified rules for identifying origin and qualifying for preferential treatment with importing countries.); Operationalization of the Waiver Concerning Preferential Treatment to Services and Service Suppliers of Least-Developed Countries (preferential treatment to be given to LDCs for 15 years from date of agreement adoption.); Duty-Free Quota-Free (DFQF) Market Access for Least-Developed Countries; Monitoring Mechanism on Special and Differential Treatment (meetings and other methods for monitoring special treatment given to developing countries)

The Peterson Institute for International Economics estimate that if the customs measures of the agreement are properly implemented, they could create US$1 trillion worth of global economic activity, add 21 million new jobs and lower the cost of doing international trade by 10–15 percent.

== History ==
Before the agreement, the negotiations repeatedly came close to collapsing. India's demand that it should be allowed to extend its domestic agricultural subsidies indefinitely was met by opposition from the U.S., while Cuba, Bolivia, Nicaragua, and Venezuela objected to the removal of a text relating to the U.S. embargo against Cuba. Eventually, India and the U.S. reached a compromise where a permanent solution to the Indian subsidies will be decided in separate future negotiations within four years, while Cuba reached a compromise that saw it refrain from vetoing the agreement. The U.S. and India came to a permanent agreement regarding India's food subsidies in November 2014.

The negotiations were originally scheduled for 3–6 December 2013. However, they had to extend until 7 December for an agreement to be reached. In December 2013, South African trade minister Rob Davies questioned the balance in the agreements regarding the long-term benefits for the least-developed countries. This was the first multilateral agreement by the WTO (concluded with 160 countries) and restored the legitimacy of the WTO as a negotiating forum.

In November 2015, India's Prime Minister Narendra Modi stated that the Bali Package had gone through a slowdown since its signature, urging other countries to implement it in due time. This statement followed a visit by Barack Obama in India, the Bali Packages being on the US president's agenda.

In Africa, critics of the plan raised the issue that the Bali Package mainly facilitates imports in the continent and they anticipated that the plan will hurt Africa's trade balance.

== See also ==
- Trans-Pacific Partnership
