= World Trade Organization Ministerial Conference of 1998 =

WTO trade conference in Geneva, Switzerland

Second Ministerial Conference of the World Trade Organization

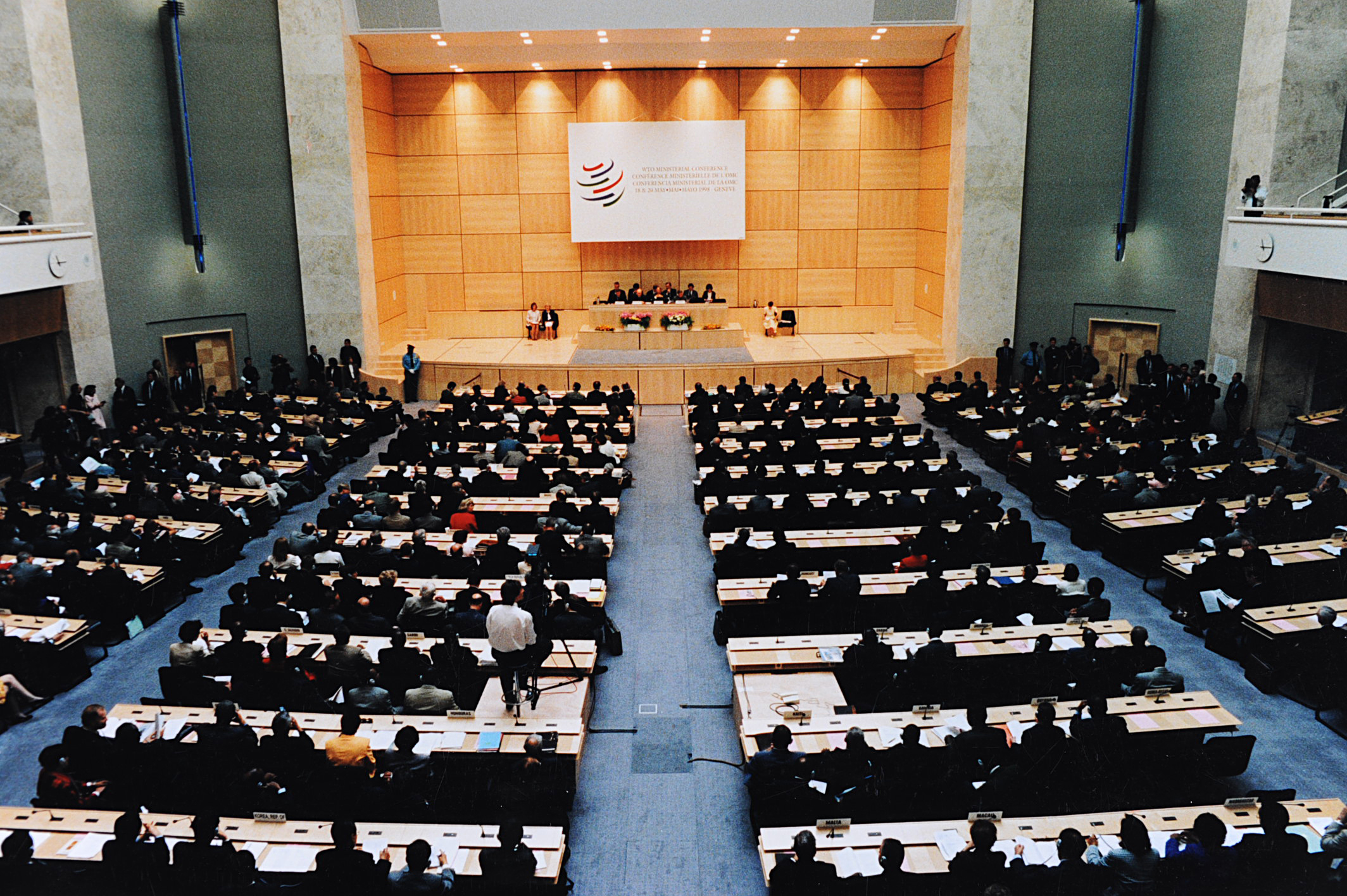
- Geneva Ministerial Conference
- Country: Geneva, Switzerland
- Previous event: World Trade Organization Ministerial Conference of 1996
- Next event: Third Ministerial Conference of the World Trade Organization
- Participants: World Trade Organization member countries

The Second Ministerial Conference of the World Trade Organization was held in Geneva, Switzerland between 18 and 20 May 1998.

== See also ==
- Doha Declaration
