= German–Polish customs war =

Economic war of early 20th century

Poland in 1923, showing its interwar borders and neighboring nations

The German–Polish customs war was a political and economic conflict between the Second Polish Republic and the Weimar Republic, which began in June 1925 (shortly after the death of German president Friedrich Ebert from SPD) and ended officially in March 1934. The conflict began when Poland's status expired as one of the Entente's most favoured nations in trade with Germany. (Note: Nonreciprocal most favoured nation status for all Allies of World War I (Entente) countries was determined in the Versailles treaty.) Berlin then decided to raise customs duty, which primarily affected the Polish coal industry, Poland's main export to Germany. In return, Warsaw also raised duty on German goods. Germany's purpose in the war was to cause a breakdown of Poland's economy and gain political concessions. They included revanchist claims to Polish territories.

== Background ==
In 1918, Poland gained independence after 123 years of foreign dominance. The economy of the newly created country was bad, the result of several wars fought on Polish soil between 1914 and 1921, and of many years of division between three partitioning powers. In 1919, industrial production on Polish lands fell by 70% in comparison to 1914, and the government in Warsaw had a difficult task. The country was divided into different economic and political systems, with several kinds of currency in circulation. The Baltic Sea port of the Free City of Danzig was not part of Poland.

The lands of former Congress Poland, which before 1914 had been responsible for 15% of industrial production of the Russian Empire, were cut off from eastern markets after the creation of the Soviet Union. In addition, the collapse of Austria-Hungary destroyed the 19th century economic ties of Galicia with Austria and Bohemia. Poland's closest ally, France, was far away, and trade with Paris was limited. Germany thus emerged as a main trade partner and market for Polish products, despite tensions between the two countries. In 1925, 40% of Polish foreign trade was with Germany, and Poland's western, most developed provinces, the Polish part of Upper Silesia, Greater Poland and Pomerelia, were even more dependent on Germany, their powerful western neighbor. Until 1925, Polish Upper Silesia sold half of its coal to Germany; in Poland, there was little demand for the rest because industrial production in Polish territory was a fraction of what it had been; in 1921, it was a mere 35% of its 1913 level.

== Polish-German relations ==
After World War I, the German Empire lost its eastern Province of Posen and West Prussia to Poland, partially after uprisings by the Polish population in Greater Poland and Silesia. These areas (Greater Poland and Gdańsk Pomerania) had been taken by Prussia in the Polish Partitions. Further territorial claims of Poland were settled in the East Prussian plebiscite and the Upper Silesia plebiscite. While Germany controlled the territories, more than 154,000 German colonists settled in the region, in addition to at least 378.000 German military and officials which were stationed in Polish territories.

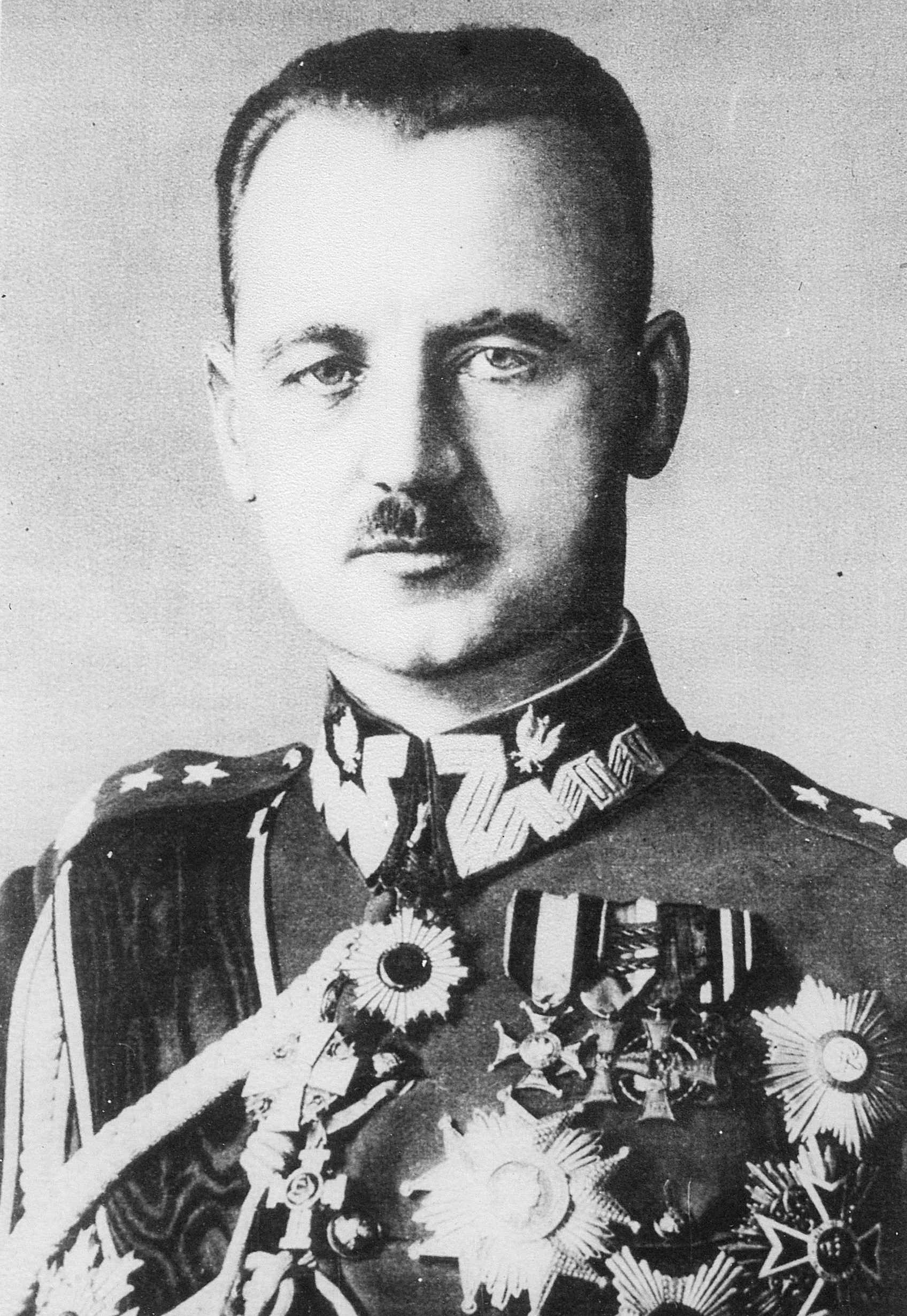
Polish Prime Minister Władysław Sikorski

In the early interwar period, in Germany, the Second Polish Republic was regarded a "temporary state" ("Saisonstaat") and tensions between the two nations were high. The German-Polish border was never officially accepted by Germany and from the start of 1919 German foreign policy aimed at revising the Versailles Treaty and acquiring once more Polish territories. To pursue its goals of territorial revisionism, Germany emphasized the presence of a German minority in Poland. In 1924, the situation in Germany improved, both internally and internationally. On 30 August 1924 in Vienna Convention, both governments agreed on the eviction of at least 28,000 Germans living in Poland who had chosen German citizenship ("Optanten" in German) and of 5,000 Poles living in Germany who had chosen Polish citizenship ("Optanci" in Polish). The Weimar Republic, which in 1926 became a member of the League of Nations, enjoyed a period of relative prosperity, which had a positive effect on Poland.

The population in the territories of Silesia and parts of Poland of the former Prussian partition, a significant minority of them ethnic Germans, became Polish citizens. Ethnic Germans were entitled to "opt" for German citizenship and leave the country; this group was called "Optanten". The Polish government sought to keep the granting of citizenship in tight limits; people who left the area in the post-war turmoils (the majority of whom were former German military personnel and officials stationed on Polish territory) were regarded "tacit Optants". According to the Minorities Treaty (also called the "Little Versailles Treaty") signed by Poland, all former citizens of partitioning powers who rejected Polish citizenship had to leave the country by 10 January 1923. This concerned citizens of Russia, Hungary, Austria and Germany, though in the case of Germans opting for German citizenship, there was no precise date established for them to leave. Per the treaty of Versailles, the victorious countries, including Poland, were authorized to liquidate the property of German nationals. Helmut Lippelt writes that Germany used the existence of the German minority in Poland for political purposes and as part of its revanchist demands, prompting Polish countermeasures. Polish Prime-Minister Władysław Sikorski stated in 1923 that the de-Germanization of these territories had to be ended by vigorous and quick liquidation of property and eviction of German "Optanten"; German nationalists were to be convinced that their view of the temporary state of Poland's western border was wrong. To Lippelt this was partially a reaction to the German claims and partially nationalism, urging to exclude the German element. In turn, German policy was fueled by anti-Polish prejudice.

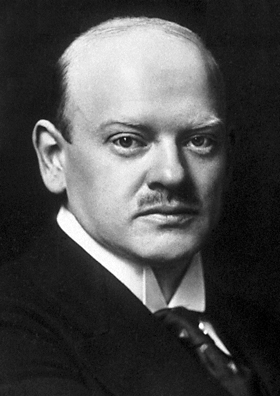
German Foreign minister Gustav Stresemann

In 1925, Gustav Stresemann proposed an agreement with France (the Locarno Treaties) and made it clear that in doing so, he intended to "gain a free hand to secure a peaceful change of the borders in the East and [...] concentrate on a later incorporation of German territories in the East". Stresemann refused to engage in any international cooperation that would have "prematurely" stabilized the Polish economy. In response to a British proposal, Stresemann wrote to the German ambassador in London, "[A] final and lasting recapitalization of Poland must be delayed until the country is ripe for a settlement of the border according to our wishes and until our own position is sufficiently strong". According to Stresemann's letter, there was to be no settlement "until [Poland's] economic and financial distress ha[d] reached an extreme stage and reduced the entire Polish body politic to a state of powerlessness". However, Stresemann did not intend to provoke a trade war. The German press openly praised the trade war, hoping it would lead to destruction of the Polish state. As the Frankfurter Zeitung wrote on 14 June 1924, "Poland must be mortally wounded after the trade war. With her blood her strength will flow away as well, and finally her independence"

== Customs war between Poland and Germany ==
In the immediate post-World War I period, trade between both nations was regulated by the Treaty of Versailles and by the Geneva Convention on Upper Silesia (1922). The Treaty of Versailles required Germany to give most favoured nation status unilaterally to all Triple Entente countries as well as to its newly created eastern neighbors. The export of goods produced in the former territories of the German Empire now in the Second Polish Republic was generally tax-free, to avoid economic collapse of the territories. According to the Geneva Convention, Germany was obliged to allow export of specified quantities of coal from the Polish part of Upper Silesia. Both documents were valid until 15 June 1925.

In June 1924, a new customs law was passed in Poland. Its aim was to protect the Polish market from foreign competitors and cover increased financial needs. It was supposed to serve as a basis for future trade agreements. While divergent terms were settled in bilateral treaties between Poland and France, Czechoslovakia, Hungary and Greece, the taxes on other imports were raised 100%.

Poland asked for renewal of the trade privileges but refused to grant most favoured nation status to German goods. In the negotiations of early 1925, Germany tried to buy time by raising trade and minority issues, such as the "Optanten" problem, liquidation measures and settlement rights; on 15 June, the relevant clauses of the treaty would expire. Germany demanded Poland to give up undisputed rights from the Treaty of Versailles and to revise the Vienna Convention, closed six months earlier. The Germans hoped that Poland would make concessions, and once again, German businessmen would follow German trade across the border. That was a sensitive issue for Poland, having just thrown off German political and economic influence.

Also, Germany demanded privileges for the German minority.

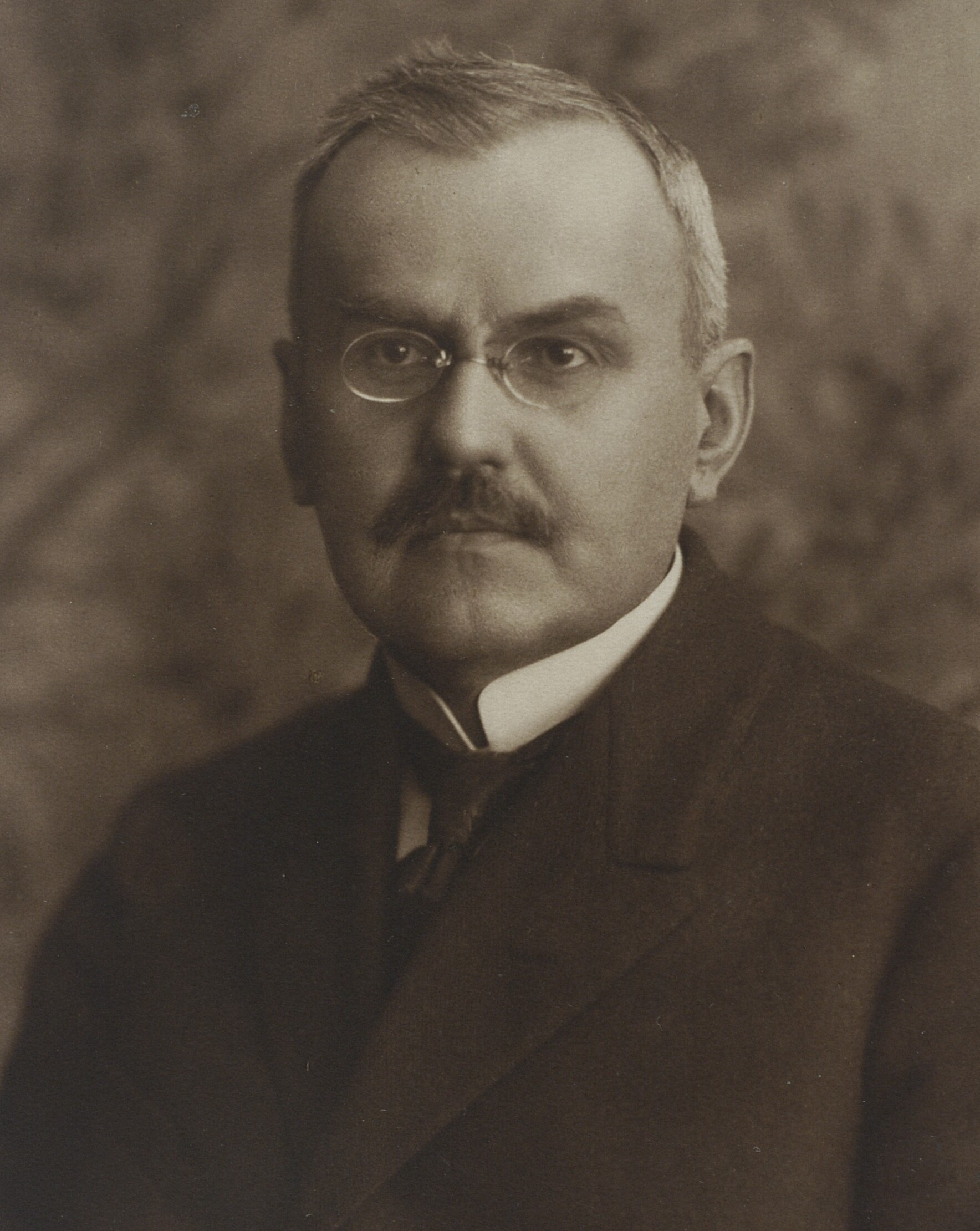
Polish Prime Minister Władysław Grabski

In January 1925, when Germany recovered its trade policy sovereignty, all purchases of Polish coal were stopped and customs duties raised on all Polish-made products. Some Polish exports were subject to a German embargo.

Warsaw responded by raising tariffs on German goods. Negotiations began in Berlin on 3 March 1925. Germany demanded more privileges for the German minority in Poland as a pre-condition for resumption of the coal trade, but Warsaw refused.

The zloty lost value, with a reduction of the Polish industrial output. The most-affected area was Polish Upper Silesia, the most developed part of the nation but also the one most dependent on trade with Germany. In November 1925, the government of Władysław Grabski collapsed.

Germany also blocked Polish attempts to get a British loan from, as Germany planned to annex Polish territory after the fall of the Polish state.

When Polish delegations tried to reach a peaceful understanding with Germany on 10 December 1926, Stresemann rejected the talks by saying there would be no normalization of German-Polish relations until the "border problems" were resolved. To clarify, he identified Upper Silesia, Pomerania and Danzig (Gdańsk) as "border problems". Reichsbank President Hjalmar Schacht agreed and stated that any economic agreements with Poland must be preceded by Poland's relinquishment of Upper Silesia and the Polish Corridor to Germany. Robert Spaulding wrote that over time "German political demands grew fantastic".

Officially, the customs war lasted until March 1934 and was settled after the German–Polish declaration of non-aggression. Poland was aided to some extent by Czechoslovakia, Austria and Italy, whose governments reduced rail tariffs on Polish exports and transit, increasing export of Polish coal to there. (Note: Also, Scandinavian markets also opened to Poland because of 1926 United Kingdom general strike.)

== Aftermath ==
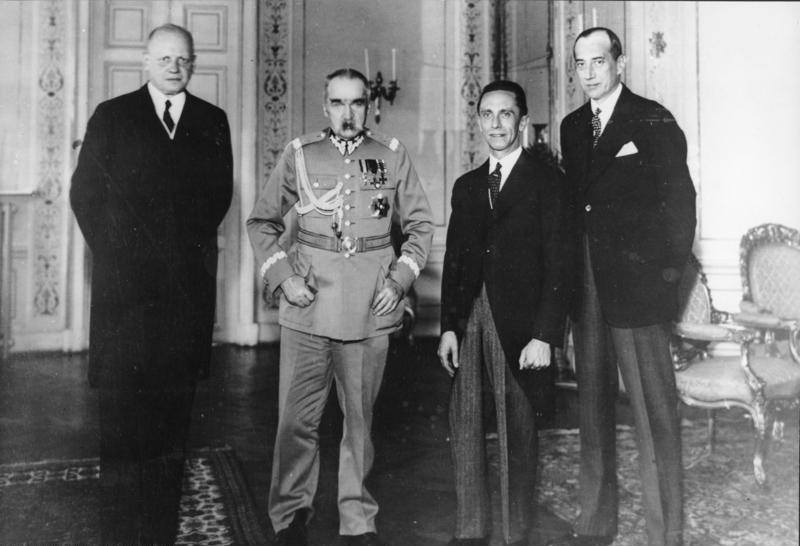
German ambassador Hans-Adolf von Moltke, Polish leader Józef Piłsudski, German propaganda minister Joseph Goebbels and Józef Beck, Polish Foreign minister, meeting in Warsaw on 15 June 1934, three months after the end of the Polish-German customs war

The Polish government, facing a breakdown in international trade, was forced to initiate a program of internal investment, which resulted in the growth of local production. Unemployment was reduced by a mass public works program, with two important components, the construction of the new Baltic Sea port of Gdynia, and the Polish Coal Trunk-Line, a rail connection between Upper Silesia and Gdynia. Since the zloty had lost much of its value, export of Polish coal to Scandinavia became profitable.

Paradoxically, the trade war had some positive consequences. Poland found new trade partners, making their economy less dependent on Germany overall, a domestic modernization program was successfully accelerated and the port of Gdynia enjoyed dynamic growth. However at the same time, poverty and unemployment sharply increased, resulting in labor strikes and demonstrations. The political mood became increasingly radicalized culminating in the May Coup d'État of 1926, carried out by Jozef Pilsudski and considered the most politically significant consequence of the trade war.

In contrast, for Germany, the customs war had a negligible effect, as exports to Poland were only 4–5% of German international trade.
