= Torquay Round =

1951 multilateral trade treaty

Dillon Round
- Status: Complete
- Genre: Trade Round
- Date: 1951
- Location: Torquay
- Country: England, United Kingdom
- Previous event: Annecy Round
- Next event: Geneva Round
- Participants: 38

The Torquay Round was a multi-year multilateral trade negotiation (MTN) between nation-states that were parties to the GATT. This third round occurred in Torquay, England in 1951. Thirty-eight countries took part in the round. 8,700 tariff concessions were made totalling the remaining amount of tariffs to ¾ of the tariffs which were in effect in 1948. The contemporaneous rejection by the U.S. of the Havana Charter signified the establishment of the GATT as a governing world body.
