= Plurilateral agreement =

Multi-national legal or trade agreement

A plurilateral agreement is a multi-national legal or trade agreement between countries. In the jargon of global economics, it is an agreement between more than two countries, but not a great many, which would be multilateral agreement.

== Use of the term in the World Trade Organization ==
The term "plurilateral agreement" is used in the World Trade Organization. A plurilateral agreement implies that WTO member countries would be given the choice to agree to new rules on a voluntary basis. This contrasts with the multilateral WTO agreement, where all WTO members are party to the agreement. The Agreement on Government Procurement is typical plurilateral agreement.

== Plurilateral treaties ==
A plurilateral treaty is a special type of multilateral treaty. A plurilateral treaty is a treaty between a limited number of states with a particular interest in the subject of the treaty. The primary difference between a plurilateral treaty and other multilateral treaties is that the availability of reservations is more limited under a plurilateral treaty. Due to the limited nature of a plurilateral treaty, the full cooperation of the parties to the treaty is required in order for the object of the treaty to be met. As a result, reservations to plurilateral treaties are not allowed without the consent of all other parties to the treaty. This principle is codified in international law by article 20(2) of the Vienna Convention on the Law of Treaties:

When it appears from the limited number of the negotiating states and the object and purpose of a treaty that the application of the treaty in its entirety between all the parties is an essential condition of the consent of each one to be bound by the treaty, a reservation requires acceptance by all the parties.

== See also ==
- Multilateral agreement
- Multilateral treaty
- International trade
- World Trade Organization
- Vienna Convention on the Law of Treaties
- Agreement on Government Procurement
