= Dillon Round =

Multilateral trade negotiation 1959-1962

- Status: Complete
- Genre: Trade Round
- Begins: 1961
- Ends: 1962
- Location: Geneva
- Country: Switzerland
- Previous event: Geneva Round
- Next event: Kennedy Round
- Participants: 26

The Dillon Round was a multi-year multilateral trade negotiation (MTN) between 26 nation-states that were parties to the GATT. The fifth round in the GATT occurred in Geneva and lasted from September 1960 through July 1962. The talks were named after U.S. Treasury Secretary and former Under Secretary of State, Douglas Dillon, who first proposed the talks. Along with reducing over $4.9 billion in tariffs with about 4,400 item-by-item cuts, it also yielded discussion relating to the creation of the European Economic Community (EEC).

One of its achievements was the adoption of a common external tariff by the European Economic Community. Significant concessions on tariffs to agricultural exports were granted by the United States. The Dillon Round was also agreed by 11 other Developed Countries and six Less Developed Countries: Cambodia, Haiti, India, Israel, Pakistan and Peru.

Concern was expressed in the US over the potential exclusion by the EEC of traditional trading partners. At the time, the six-nation EEC accounted for one-sixth of US foreign trade, including over one-fifth of US farm exports. The Trade Expansion Act was passed as a result of the Dillon Round, in order to "help preserve the economic basis for Atlantic co-operation."
