= Geneva Round =

Fourth session of General Agreement on Tariffs and Trade

- Status: Complete
- Genre: Trade Round
- Begins: 1955
- Ends: 1956
- Location: Geneva
- Country: Switzerland
- Previous event: Torquay Round
- Next event: Dillon Round
- Participants: 26

The Geneva Round was the fourth session of General Agreement on Tariffs and Trade (GATT) multilateral trade negotiations in Geneva, Switzerland. It started in 1955 and lasted until May 1956. Twenty-six countries took part in the round. $2.5 billion in tariffs were eliminated or reduced.
