= Kennedy Round =

Sixth session of General Agreement on Tariffs and Trade

- Status: Complete
- Genre: Trade Round
- Begins: 1964
- Ends: 1967
- Location: Geneva
- Country: Switzerland
- Previous event: Dillon Round
- Next event: Tokyo Round
- Participants: 62

The Kennedy Round was the sixth session of General Agreement on Tariffs and Trade (GATT) multilateral trade negotiations held between 1964 and 1967 in Geneva, Switzerland. Congressional passage of the U.S. Trade Expansion Act in 1962 authorized the White House to conduct mutual tariff negotiations, ultimately leading to the Kennedy Round. Participation greatly increased over previous rounds. Sixty-six nations, representing 80% of world trade, attended the official opening on May 4, 1964, at the Palais des Nations. Despite several disagreements over details, the director general announced the round's success on May 15, 1967, and the final agreement was signed on June 30, 1967—the last day permitted under the Trade Expansion Act. The round was named after U.S. President John F. Kennedy, who was assassinated six months before the opening negotiations.

The main objectives of the Kennedy Round were to:

- Slash tariffs by half with a minimum of exceptions
- Break down farm trade restrictions
- Remove non-tariff barriers
- Help developing countries

== History ==
=== Background ===
The European trade integration signaled by the creation of the European Economic Community (EEC) in the 1957 Treaty of Rome led the United States to fear its own products would be shut out of the European market. Thus, President Kennedy pressed for the passage of the Trade Expansion Act, which gave the president authority to decrease duties up to 50% from their 1962 levels or increase them up to 50% from their 1934 levels. The window for this increased authority was after June 30, 1962, and before July 1, 1967. Trade adjustment assistance was considered within the act with several provisions that provided for the financial and technical assistance to firms and workers adversely affected by the opening of trade. It also made provisions for treating the EEC as a single trade partner and made special provisions for any trade agreements covering agricultural commodities. After the act was passed, the administration pressed for a new round of multilateral trade talks to utilize its new authority, which would become known as the Kennedy Round upon the death of President Kennedy in November 1963.

=== Negotiations ===
The Kennedy Round officially opened on May 4, 1964, at the Palais des Nations. It was the last GATT round to have tariff reduction as its primary focus. However, it was the first GATT round to deal with non-tariff issues, such as dumping, a practice whereby a company exports a product at a price lower than the price it charges in its home market. It notably also pioneered a "linear" style of negotiations. In contrast to the item-by-item negotiations of previous GATT rounds, many countries offered across-the-board cuts of a certain percentage on all tariffs of participating countries. Members of the so-called "Bridge Club"—the United States, European Economic Community, Japan, and the UK—led the negotiations and offered linear cuts. Six other European countries joined them in linear cuts. Another 36 countries were nonlinear participators, a difference which led to tension within the negotiations, as linear countries often felt nonlinear countries had no right to participate in the "confrontation and justice" procedure for dealing with proposed exceptions. Thus, although the Kennedy Administration had originally contemplated finishing the round in six months, the round was plagued with delays and slow progress. In addition to the linear and nonlinear divides, disputes arose over agricultural policy and tariff disparities. The United States wanted Europe to agree to cut farm tariffs before moving on to industrial tariffs, but gridlock forced the United States to relent. Only low expectations stopped the concluding agricultural agreements from being considered a disaster. Further, equivalent percentage cuts to high U.S. tariffs (18% on average) and medium EEC tariffs (12% on average ) were seen to favor the United States. Since President Lyndon Johnson had little chance of success in reauthorizing the Trade Expansion Act, its July 1, 1967 deadline served as the effective deadline for the Kennedy round. After a marathon session, negotiators announced a satisfactory agreement at a midnight meeting with the press on May 15, 1967. The final agreement was signed on June 30, 1967. However, within the United States, Congress repealed several provisions of the round of global tariff cuts, hurting the future credibility of the United States in worldwide trade negotiations.

== Effects ==
U.S. tariff concessions involved $8.5 billion worth of goods, and foreign tariff concessions on imports from the United States involved $8.1 billion. 64% of non-agricultural dutiable imports were covered by U.S. linear cuts, with an average tariff reduction of 35%. Foreign tariff reductions were on average 34%, and covered 48% of their non-agricultural dutiable imports. Non-tariff achievements included the establishment of the GATT Antidumping Code of 1967, which gave a procedural framework for negotiating dumping accusations and expanded upon the original Article VI in GATT. The round can also be seen as a success for developing nations. A "Trade and Development" section was added to the GATT charter; its most significant feature was exempting developing nations from the rule of reciprocity. It also called for the stabilization of raw material prices. Further, the agricultural grains arrangement provided for higher minimum trading prices as well as a food aid program to developing countries. Some progress was also made with negotiations on commodities. The round extended the Long Term Cotton Textile Arrangement for another three years and provided frameworks for negotiating steel, aluminum, chemicals, pulp, and paper tariffs.

== Criticism ==
General protectionist criticisms have been made of the round. In voting to withdraw from the WTO in 2000, Congressman Jack Metcalf cited the Kennedy round as the beginning of "the slow decline in Americans’ living standards" and that all such multilateral agreements "may mesmerize and motivate Washington policymakers, but in the American heartland...translate as further efforts to promote international order at the expense of existing American jobs". However, the round also has economically liberal critics, who believe that it did not achieve as liberal of goals as the tariff cuts suggest and instead, out of political fears, erected non-tariff barriers to protect domestic industries from the negative effects of trade.
