= Annecy Round =

International trade negotiation, adopted in 1949

- Status: Complete
- Genre: Trade Round
- Date: 1949
- Location: Annecy
- Country: France
- Previous event: Initial Round
- Next event: Torquay Round
- Participants: 13

The Annecy Round was a multi-year multilateral trade negotiation (MTN) between 26 nation-states that were parties to the GATT. This second round took place in 1949 in the Imperial Hotel in Annecy, France. 13 countries took part in the round. The main focus of the talks was more tariff reductions, around 5,000 in total.
