= Tokyo Round =

1980 GATT treaty

- Status: Complete
- Genre: Trade Round
- Begins: September 12, 1973
- Ends: April, 1979
- Location: Tokyo
- Country: Japan
- Previous event: Kennedy Round
- Next event: Uruguay Round
- Participants: 102

The Tokyo Round was a multi-year multilateral trade negotiation (MTN) between the 102 states which were parties to the General Agreement on Tariffs and Trade (GATT). The negotiations resulted in reduced tariffs and established new regulations aimed at controlling the proliferation of non-tariff barriers (NTBs) and voluntary export restrictions. The aim was further to harmonise government policies. Concessions were made on $19 billion worth of trade, and were scheduled to enter effect over eight years from 1980. The Tokyo Round concluded in April 1979.

The Tokyo Round was held to be "the most comprehensive of all the seven rounds of negotiations held within the GATT since its founding in 1948". One novelty was that it covered bovine meat and dairy products. The agricultural sector was a focus. Developing countries were given more say in this round than had been the case in past MTNs.
