= International Trade Organization =

Proposed international institution

The International Trade Organization (ITO) was the proposed name for an international institution for the regulation of trade.

Led by the United States in collaboration with allies, the effort to form the organization from 1945 to 1948, with the successful passing of the Havana Charter, eventually failed due to lack of approval by the US Congress. Until the creation of the World Trade Organization in 1995, international trade was managed through the General Agreement on Tariffs and Trade (GATT).

== History ==
=== Proposal of an international trade institution ===
The Bretton Woods Conference of 1944, which established an international institution for monetary policy, recognized the need for a comparable international institution for trade to complement the International Monetary Fund and the World Bank. Bretton Woods was attended by representatives of finance ministries and not by representatives of trade ministries, the proposed reason why a trade agreement was not negotiated at that time.

In early December 1945, the United States invited its wartime allies to enter into negotiations to conclude a multilateral agreement for the reciprocal reduction of tariffs on trade in goods. In July 1945, the US Congress had granted President Harry S. Truman the authority to negotiate and conclude such an agreement. At the proposal of the United States, the United Nations Economic and Social Committee adopted a resolution, in February 1946, calling for a conference to draft a charter for an International Trade Organization.

A Preparatory Committee was established in February 1946, and met for the first time in London in October 1946 to work on the charter of an international organization for trade; the work was continued from April to November 1947.

=== General Agreement on Tariffs and Trade ===
At the same time, eight countries that had negotiated the GATT signed the "Protocol of Provisional Application of the General Agreement on Tariffs and Trade". Those eight countries were the United States, the United Kingdom, Canada, Australia, France, Belgium, the Netherlands, and Luxembourg.

=== Havana Charter ===
The founding document of the ITO was negotiated in Cuba from November 1947 to March 1948. The Havana Charter (formally the "Final Act of the United Nations Conference on Trade and Employment") provided for the establishment of the ITO and set out the basic rules for international trade and other international economic matters. It was signed by 56 countries on March 24, 1948. It allowed for international cooperation and rules against anti-competitive business practices.

The Charter, proposed by John Maynard Keynes, sought to establish the ITO and a financial institution called the International Clearing Union (ICU), and an international currency; the bancor. The Havana Charter institutions were to stabilize trade by encouraging nations to "net zero", with trade surplus and trade deficit both discouraged. This negative feedback was to be accomplished by allowing nations overdraft equal to half the average value of the country's trade over the preceding five years, with interest charged on both surplus and deficit.

=== Failure in United States Congress ===
The Charter never came into force, in part because in 1950 the United States government announced that it would not submit the treaty to the United States Senate for ratification. While repeatedly submitted to the US Congress, the charter was never approved. The most usual argument against the new organization was that it would be involved into internal economic issues. On December 6, 1950, President Truman announced that he would no longer seek Congressional approval of the ITO Charter. Because of the American rejection of the Charter, no other state ratified the treaty. Elements of the Charter would later become part of the General Agreement on Tariffs and Trade (GATT).

=== Individual trade agreements and World Trade Organization ===
In the absence of an international organization for trade, countries turned, from the early 1950s, to the only existing multilateral international institution for trade, the GATT 1947, to handle problems concerning their trade relations. Therefore, the GATT would over the years "transform itself" into a de facto international organization. It was contemplated that the GATT would be applied for several years until the ITO came into force. However, since the ITO was never brought into being, the GATT gradually became the focus for international governmental cooperation on trade matters.

Seven rounds of negotiations occurred under GATT before the eighth round—the Uruguay Round—concluded in 1994 with the establishment of the World Trade Organization (WTO) as the GATT's replacement. The GATT principles and agreements were adopted by the WTO, which was charged with administering and extending them.

== See also ==
- Bretton Woods system
