= General Agreement on Tariffs and Trade =

1947–1995 multilateral trade agreement

- Type: Multilateral treaty
- Context: СТпМ
- Signed: 30 October 1947
- Location: Geneva, Switzerland
- Condition: ratification by territories representing 85% of trade of signatories
- Provisional application: 1 January 1948
- Depositary: Executive Secretary to the Contracting Parties
- Languages: English and French

The General Agreement on Tariffs and Trade (GATT) is a legal agreement between many countries, whose overall purpose was to promote international trade by reducing or eliminating trade barriers such as tariffs or quotas. According to its preamble, its purpose was the "substantial reduction of tariffs and other trade barriers and the elimination of preferences, on a reciprocal and mutually advantageous basis".

The GATT was first discussed during the United Nations Conference on Trade and Employment and was the outcome of the failure of negotiating governments to create the International Trade Organization (ITO). It was signed by 23 nations in Geneva on 30 October 1947, and was applied on a provisional basis 1 January 1948. It remained in effect until 1 January 1995, when the World Trade Organization (WTO) was established after agreement by 123 nations in Marrakesh on 15 April 1994, as part of the Uruguay Round Agreements. The WTO is the successor to the GATT, and the original GATT text (GATT 1947) is still in effect under the WTO framework, subject to the modifications of GATT 1994. Nations that were not party in 1995 to the GATT need to meet the minimum conditions spelled out in specific documents before they can accede; in September 2019, the list contained 36 nations.

The GATT, and its successor the WTO, have succeeded in reducing tariffs. The average tariff levels for the major GATT participants were about 22% in 1947, but were 5% after the Uruguay Round in 1999. Experts attribute part of these tariff changes to GATT and the WTO.

== History ==
The General Agreement on Tariffs and Trade is a multi-national trade treaty. It has been updated in a series of global trade negotiations consisting of nine rounds between 1947 and 1995. The "GATT's major intellectual architects" were the GATT lawyer Ernst-Ulrich Petersmann, Jan Tumlir, an economics professor at the Geneva Graduate Institute, and the U.S. law professor John Jackson. The GATT's role in international trade was largely succeeded in 1995 by the World Trade Organization.

During the 1940s, the United States sought to establish a set of post-war multilateral institutions, one of which would be devoted to the reconstruction of world trade. In 1945 and 1946, the U.S. took concrete steps to bring about such an organisation, proposing a conference to negotiate a charter for a trade organisation. The GATT was first conceived at the 1947 United Nations Conference on Trade and Employment (UNCTE), at which the International Trade Organization (ITO) was one of the ideas proposed. It was hoped that the ITO would be run alongside the World Bank and the International Monetary Fund (IMF). More than 50 nations negotiated ITO and organising its founding charter, but after the withdrawal of the United States these negotiations collapsed.

GATT and WTO trade rounds
Name	Start	Duration	Countries	Subjects covered	Achievements
(Switzerland) Geneva	April 1947	7 months	23	Tariffs	Signing of GATT, 45,000 tariff concessions affecting $10 billion of trade
(France) Annecy	April 1949	5 months	34	Tariffs	Countries exchanged some 5,000 tariff concessions
(United Kingdom) Torquay	September 1950	8 months	34	Tariffs	Countries exchanged some 8,700 tariff concessions, cutting the 1948 tariff levels by 25%
(Switzerland) Geneva II	January 1956	5 months	22	Tariffs, admission of Japan	$2.5 billion in tariff reductions
(Switzerland) Dillon	September 1960	11 months	45	Tariffs	Tariff concessions worth $4.9 billion of world trade
(Switzerland) Kennedy	May 1964	37 months	48	Tariffs, anti-dumping	Tariff concessions worth $40 billion of world trade
(Japan) Tokyo	September 1973	74 months	102	Tariffs, non-tariff measures, "framework" agreements	Tariff reductions worth more than $300 billion achieved
Uruguay	September 1986	87 months	123	Tariffs, non-tariff measures, rules, services, intellectual property, dispute settlement, textiles, agriculture, creation of WTO, etc.	The round led to the creation of WTO, and extended the range of trade negotiations, leading to major reductions in tariffs (about 40%) and agricultural subsidies, an agreement to allow full access for textiles and clothing from developing countries, and an extension of intellectual property rights.
(Qatar) Doha	November 2001	?	159	Tariffs, non-tariff measures, agriculture, labor standards, environment, competition, investment, transparency, patents etc.	The round has not yet concluded. The last agreement to date, the Bali Package, was signed on 7 December 2013.

=== Initial round ===
Preparatory sessions were held simultaneously at the UNCTE regarding the GATT. After several of these sessions, 23 nations signed the GATT on 30 October 1947 in Geneva, Switzerland. It came into force on 1 January 1948. From the outset, government procurement was excluded from the scope of the agreement.

The first round of negotiations were conducted through a request-and-offer procedure inherited from practices used by the United States under the Reciprocal Tariff Act of 1934. Each Contracting Party first circulated lists of the tariff reductions it sought from each other participant, then responded with lists of offers, after which the parties negotiated bilaterally; between January and mid-June 1947 the 93 pairs of countries held almost 300 bilateral meetings. Under the principal supplier rule, a country would normally negotiate a reduction on a product only with the country that had been its principal supplier of that product. The most favoured nation clause ensured that every concession reached bilaterally was then extended to all other participants. Concessions took two forms: a reduction of the tariff, or a "binding" that committed the country not to raise the existing rate.

=== Annecy Round: 1949 ===
The second round took place in 1949 in Annecy, France. 13 countries took part in the round. The main focus of the talks was more tariff reductions, around 5,000 in total.

=== Torquay Round: 1951 ===
The third round occurred in Torquay, England, in 1951. Thirty-eight countries took part in the round. 8,700 tariff concessions were made totalling the remaining amount of tariffs to ¾ of the tariffs which were in effect in 1948. The contemporaneous rejection by the U.S. of the Havana Charter signified the establishment of the GATT as a governing world body.

=== Geneva Round: 1955–1956 ===
The fourth round returned to Geneva in 1955 and lasted until May 1956. Twenty-six countries took part in the round. $2.5 billion in tariffs were eliminated or reduced.

=== Dillon Round: 1960–1962 ===
The fifth round occurred once more in Geneva and lasted from 1960 to 1962. The talks were named after U.S. Treasury Secretary and former Under Secretary of State Douglas Dillon, who first proposed the talks. Twenty-six countries took part in the round. Along with reducing over $4.9 billion in tariffs, it also yielded discussion relating to the creation of the European Economic Community (EEC).

=== Kennedy Round: 1964–1967 ===
The sixth round of GATT multilateral trade negotiations took place between 1964 and 1967. It was named after U.S. President John F. Kennedy in recognition of his support for the reformulation of the United States trade agenda, which resulted in the Trade Expansion Act of 1962. This Act gave the President the widest-ever negotiating authority.

As the Dillon Round went through the laborious process of item-by-item tariff negotiations, it became clear, long before the Round ended, that a more comprehensive approach was needed to deal with the emerging challenges resulting from the formation of the European Economic Community (EEC) and EFTA, as well as Europe's re-emergence as a significant international trader more generally.

Japan's high economic growth rate portended the major role it would play later as an exporter, but the focal point of the Kennedy Round always was the United States–EEC relationship. Indeed, there was an influential American view that saw what became the Kennedy Round as the start of a transatlantic partnership that might ultimately lead to a transatlantic economic community.

To an extent, this view was shared in Europe, but the process of European unification created its own stresses under which the Kennedy Round at times became a secondary focus for the EEC. An example of this was the French veto in January 1963, before the round had even started, on membership by the United Kingdom.

Another was the internal crisis of 1965, which ended in the Luxembourg Compromise. Preparations for the new round were immediately overshadowed by the Chicken War, an early sign of the impact variable levies under the Common Agricultural Policy would eventually have. Some participants in the Round had been concerned that the convening of UNCTAD, scheduled for 1964, would result in further complications, but its impact on the actual negotiations was minimal.

In May 1963 Ministers reached agreement on three negotiating objectives for the round:

1. Measures for the expansion of trade of developing countries as a means of furthering their economic development,
2. Reduction or elimination of tariffs and other barriers to trade, and
3. Measures for access to markets for agricultural and other primary products.

The working hypothesis for the tariff negotiations was a linear tariff cut of 50% with the smallest number of exceptions. A drawn-out argument developed about the trade effects a uniform linear cut would have on the dispersed rates (low and high tariffs quite far apart) of the United States as compared to the much more concentrated rates of the EEC which also tended to be in the lower held of United States tariff rates.

The EEC accordingly argued for an evening-out or harmonisation of peaks and troughs through its cerement, double cart and thirty: ten proposals. Once negotiations had been joined, the lofty working hypothesis was soon undermined. The special-structure countries (Australia, Canada, New Zealand and South Africa), so called because their exports were dominated by raw materials and other primary commodities, negotiated their tariff reductions entirely through the item-by-item method.

In the end, the result was an average 35% reduction in tariffs, except for textiles, chemicals, steel and other sensitive products; plus a 15% to 18% reduction in tariffs for agricultural and food products. In addition, the negotiations on chemicals led to a provisional agreement on the abolition of the American Selling Price (ASP). This was a method of valuing some chemicals used by the noted States for the imposition of import duties which gave domestic manufacturers a much higher level of protection than the tariff schedule indicated.

However, this part of the outcome was disallowed by Congress, and the American Selling Price was not abolished until Congress adopted the results of the Tokyo Round. The results on agriculture overall were poor. The most notable achievement was agreement on a Memorandum of Agreement on Basic Elements for the Negotiation of a World Grants Arrangement, which eventually was rolled into a new International Grains Arrangement.

The EEC claimed that for it the main result of the negotiations on agriculture was that they "greatly helped to define its own common policy". The developing countries, who played a minor role throughout the negotiations in this round, benefited nonetheless from substantial tariff cuts particularly in non-agricultural items of interest to them.

Their main achievement at the time, however, was seen to be the adoption of Part IV of the GATT, which absolved them from according reciprocity to developed countries in trade negotiations. In the view of many developing countries, this was a direct result of the call at UNCTAD I for a better trade deal for them.

There has been argument ever since whether this symbolic gesture was a victory for them, or whether it ensured their exclusion in the future from meaningful participation in the multilateral trading system. On the other hand, there was no doubt that the extension of the Long-Term Arrangement Regarding International Trade in Cotton Textiles, which later became the Multi-Fiber Arrangement, for three years until 1970 led to the longer-term impairment of export opportunities for developing countries.

Another outcome of the Kennedy Round was the adoption of an Anti-dumping Code, which gave more precise guidance on the implementation of Article VI of the GATT. In particular, it sought to ensure speedy and fair investigations, and it imposed limits on the retrospective application of anti-dumping measures.

$40 billion in tariffs were eliminated or reduced via the Kennedy Round.

=== Tokyo Round: 1973–1979 ===
Reduced tariffs and established new regulations aimed at controlling the proliferation of non-tariff barriers and voluntary export restrictions. 102 countries took part in the round. Concessions were made on $19 billion worth of trade.

=== Formation of Quadrilateral Group: 1981 ===
The Quadrilateral Group was formed in 1982 by the European Union, the United States, Japan and Canada, to influence the GATT.

=== Uruguay Round: 1986–1994 ===
The Uruguay Round began in 1986. It was the most ambitious round to date, as of 1986, hoping to expand the competence of the GATT to important new areas such as services, capital, intellectual property, textiles, and agriculture. 123 countries took part in the round. The Uruguay Round was also the first set of multilateral trade negotiations in which developing countries had played an active role.

Agriculture was essentially exempted from previous agreements as it was given special status in the areas of import quotas and export subsidies, with only mild caveats. However, by the time of the Uruguay round, many countries considered the exception of agriculture to be sufficiently glaring that they refused to sign a new deal without some movement on agricultural products. These fourteen countries came to be known as the "Cairns Group", and included mostly small and medium-sized agricultural exporters such as Australia, Brazil, Canada, Indonesia, and New Zealand.

The Agreement on Agriculture of the Uruguay Round continues to be the most substantial trade liberalisation agreement in agricultural products in the history of trade negotiations. The goals of the agreement were to improve market access for agricultural products, reduce domestic support of agriculture in the form of price-distorting subsidies and quotas, eliminate over time export subsidies on agricultural products and to harmonise to the extent possible sanitary and phytosanitary measures between member countries.

The principles and legal framework established by GATT did not become obsolete with the creation of the World Trade Organization (WTO) in 1995. Instead, they formed the substantive and institutional foundation for the expanded multilateral trading system. The landmark agreements negotiated during the Uruguay Round that created the WTO—particularly the General Agreement on Trade in Services (GATS) and the Agreement on Trade-Related Investment Measures (TRIMs)—were explicitly constructed upon core GATT disciplines.

== World Trade Organization ==
In 1993, the GATT was updated ('GATT 1994') to include new obligations upon its signatories. One of the most significant changes was the creation of the World Trade Organization (WTO). The 76 existing GATT members and the European Communities became the founding members of the WTO on 1 January 1995. The other 51 GATT members rejoined the WTO in the following two years (the last being Congo in 1997). Since the founding of the WTO, 33 new non-GATT members have joined and 22 are currently negotiating membership. There are a total of 164 member countries in the WTO, with Liberia and Afghanistan being the newest members as of 2018.

Of the original GATT members, Syria, Lebanon and the SFR Yugoslavia have not rejoined the WTO. Since FR Yugoslavia (renamed as Serbia and Montenegro and with membership negotiations later split in two), is not recognised as a direct SFRY successor state; therefore, its application is considered a new (non-GATT) one. The General Council of WTO, on 4 May 2010, agreed to establish a working party to examine the request of Syria for WTO membership. The contracting parties who founded the WTO ended official agreement of the "GATT 1947" terms on 31 December 1995. Montenegro became a member in 2012, while Serbia is in the decision stage of the negotiations and is expected to become a member of the WTO in the future.

While GATT was a set of rules agreed upon by nations, the WTO is an intergovernmental organisation with its own headquarters and staff, and its scope includes both traded goods and trade within the service sector and intellectual property rights. Although it was designed to serve multilateral agreements, during several rounds of GATT negotiations (particularly the Tokyo Round) plurilateral agreements created selective trading and caused fragmentation among members. WTO arrangements are generally a multilateral agreement settlement mechanism of GATT.

== Effects on trade liberalisation ==
The average tariff levels for the major GATT participants were about 22 per cent in 1947. As a result of the first negotiating rounds, tariffs were reduced in the GATT core of the United States, United Kingdom, Canada, and Australia, relative to other contracting parties and non-GATT participants. By the Kennedy round (1962–67), the average tariff levels of GATT participants were about 15%. After the Uruguay Round, tariffs were under 5%.

In addition to facilitating applied tariff reductions, the early GATT's contribution to trade liberalisation "include binding the negotiated tariff reductions for an extended period (made more permanent in 1955), establishing the generality of non-discrimination through most favoured nation (MFN) treatment and national treatment status, ensuring increased transparency of trade policy measures, and providing a forum for future negotiations and for the peaceful resolution of bilateral disputes. All of these elements contributed to the rationalization of trade policy and the reduction of trade barriers and policy uncertainty."

According to Dartmouth economic historian Douglas Irwin,

The prosperity of the world economy over the past half century owes a great deal to the growth of world trade which, in turn, is partly the result of farsighted officials who created the GATT. They established a set of procedures giving stability to the trade-policy environment and thereby facilitating the rapid growth of world trade. With the long run in view, the original GATT conferees helped put the world economy on a sound foundation and thereby improved the livelihood of hundreds of millions of people around the world.

== Article 24 ==
Following the United Kingdom's vote to withdraw from the European Union, supporters of leaving the EU suggested that Article 24, paragraph 5B of the treaty could be used to maintain a "standstill" in trading conditions between the UK and the EU in the event of the UK leaving the EU without a trade deal, hence preventing the introduction of tariffs. According to the proponents of this approach, it could have been used to implement an interim agreement pending negotiation of a final agreement lasting up to ten years.

This claim formed the basis of the so-called "Malthouse compromise" between Conservative party factions as to how to replace the withdrawal agreement. However, this plan was rejected by parliament. The claim that Article 24 might be used was also adopted by Boris Johnson during his 2019 campaign to lead the Conservative Party.

The claim that Article 24 might have been used in this way was criticised by Mark Carney, Liam Fox and others as being unrealistic given the requirement in paragraph 5c of the treaty that there be an agreement between the parties for paragraph 5b to be of use as, in the event of a "no-deal" scenario, there would be no agreement. Moreover, critics of the GATT 24 approach pointed out that services would not be covered by such an arrangement.

== Special and differential treatment ==
Special and differential treatment (S&D) is a set of GATT provisions (GATT 1947, Article XVIII) that exempts developing countries from the same strict trade rules and disciplines of more industrialized countries. That is, developed countries will treat developing countries differently. In the Uruguay Round Agreement on Agriculture, for example, developing countries are given longer time periods to phase in export subsidy and tariff reductions than the more industrialized countries. The least developed countries are exempt from any reduction commitments.

== See also ==
- Cultural exception
- Most favoured nation
- National treatment
