= Uruguay Round =

1986-1994 series of free trade negotiations

- Status: Complete
- Genre: Trade Round
- Begins: September 1986
- Ends: 15 April 1994
- Locations: Punta del Este, Montreal, Geneva, Brussels, Washington, D.C., Tokyo, Marrakesh
- Country: Uruguay, Canada, Switzerland, Belgium, United States, Japan, Morocco
- Previous event: Tokyo Round
- Next event: Doha Development Round
- Participants: 105

The Uruguay Round was the 8th round of multilateral trade negotiations (MTN) conducted within the framework of the General Agreement on Tariffs and Trade (GATT), spanning from 1986 to 1993 and embracing 123 countries as "contracting parties". The Round led to the creation of the World Trade Organization, with GATT remaining as an integral part of the WTO agreements. The broad mandate of the Round had been to extend GATT trade rules to areas previously exempted as too difficult to liberalize (agriculture, textiles) and increasingly important new areas previously not included (trade in services, intellectual property, investment policy trade distortions). The Round came into effect in 1995 with deadlines ending in 2000 (2004 in the case of developing country contracting parties) under the administrative direction of the newly created World Trade Organization (WTO).

The Doha Development Round was the next trade round, beginning in 2001 and still unresolved after missing its official deadline of 2005.

== Goals ==
The main objectives of the Uruguay Round were:

- to reduce agricultural subsidies
- to lift restrictions on foreign investment
- to begin the process of opening trade in services like banking and insurance.
- to include the protection of intellectual property

They also wanted to draft a code to deal with copyright violation and other forms of intellectual property rights.

== History ==
A set of updated documents was produced in Geneva by the office of the Director-General during July 1986 in order to prepare the way for progress to be made. As described below, the round was launched in Punta del Este, Uruguay in September 1986, followed by negotiations in Geneva, Brussels, Washington, D.C., and Tokyo.

=== Background ===
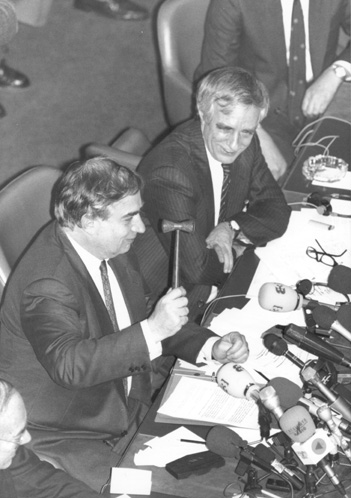

The 1986 Ministerial Declaration identified problems including structural deficiencies, spill-over impacts of certain countries' policies on world trade GATT could not manage. To address these issues, the eighth GATT round (known as the Uruguay Round) was launched in September 1986, in Punta del Este, Uruguay. It was the biggest negotiating mandate on trade ever agreed: the talks were going to extend the trading system into several new areas, notably trade in services and intellectual property, and to reform trade in the sensitive sectors of agriculture and textiles; all the original GATT articles were up for review.

The round was supposed to end in December 1990, but the US and EU disagreed on how to reform agricultural trade and decided to extend the talks. Finally, in November 1992, the US and EU settled most of their differences in a deal known informally as "the Blair House accord", and on 15 April 1994, the deal was signed by ministers from most of the 123 participating governments at a meeting in Marrakesh, Morocco. The agreement established the World Trade Organization, which came into being upon its entry into force on 1 January 1995, to replace the GATT system. It is widely regarded as the most profound institutional reform of the world trading system since the GATT's establishment.

The position of Developing Countries (GATT) was detailed in the book: Brazil in the Uruguay Round of the GATT: The Evolution of Brazil’s Position in the Uruguay Round, with Emphasis on the Issue of Services. In this book, the polemics about the issue of services are described, as well as the opposition of Developing Countries to the so called "New Issues".

=== Conclusion and signature ===
The 20 agreements were signed in Marrakesh—the Marrakesh Agreement—in April 1994.

== Achievements ==
The GATT still exists as the WTO's umbrella treaty for trade in goods, updated as a result of the Uruguay Round negotiations (a distinction is made between GATT 1994, the updated parts of GATT, and GATT 1947, the original agreement which is still the heart of GATT 1994). The GATT 1994 is not, however, the only legally binding agreement included in the Final Act; a long list of about 60 agreements, annexes, decisions and understandings was adopted. In fact, the agreements fall into a simple structure with six main parts:

- an umbrella agreement (the Agreement Establishing the WTO);
- goods and investment (the Multilateral Agreements on Trade in Goods including the GATT 1994 and the Trade Related Investment Measures (TRIMS));
- services (General Agreement on Trade in Services (GATS));
- intellectual property (Agreement on Trade-Related Aspects of Intellectual Property Rights (TRIPS));
- dispute settlement (DSU);
- reviews of governments' trade policies (TPRM).

The agreements for the two largest areas under the WTO, goods and services, share a three-part outline:

- broad principles (such as the General Agreement on Tariffs and Trade and General Agreement on Trade in Services);
- extra agreements and annexes;
- lengthy schedules (lists) of commitments made by individual countries.

One of the achievements of the Uruguay round would be the Uruguay Round Agreement on Agriculture, administered by the WTO, which brings agricultural trade more fully under the GATT. Prior to the Uruguay Round, conditions for agricultural trade were deteriorating with increasing use of subsidies, build-up of stocks, declining world prices and escalating costs of support. It provides for converting quantitative restrictions to tariffs and for a phased reduction of tariffs. The agreement also imposes rules and disciplines on agricultural export subsidies, domestic subsidies, and sanitary and phytosanitary (SPS) measures through the Agreement on the Application of Sanitary and Phytosanitary Measures.

== Criticism ==
Groups such as Oxfam have criticized the Uruguay Round for paying insufficient attention to the needs of developing countries. One aspect of this criticism is that figures very close to rich country industries—such as former Cargill executive Dan Amstutz—had a major role in the drafting of Uruguay Round language on agriculture and other matters. As with the WTO in general, non-governmental organizations (NGOs) such as Health Gap and Global Trade Watch also criticize what was negotiated in the Round on intellectual property and industrial tariffs as setting up too many constraints on policy-making and human needs. An article asserts that the developing countries’ lack of experience in WTO negotiations and lack of knowledge of how the developing economies would be affected by what the industrial countries wanted in the WTO new areas; the intensified mercantilist attitude of the GATT/WTO’s major power, the US; the structure of the WTO that made the GATT tradition of decision by consensus ineffective, so that a country would not preserve the status quo, were the reasons for this imbalance.

== See also ==
- Cairns Group - interest group composed of 19 agricultural exporting nations, including Uruguay
- Cultural exception - political concept arguing that culture is to be treated differently than commercial products
- Doha Development Round - ongoing trade negotiation round; commenced in 2001
- Golan v. Holder, a challenge to the copyright restoration provisions of the Uruguay Round Agreements Act, the implementation of the Uruguay Round agreements in the United States Code. The Act was upheld.
- Tokyo Round - trade negotiation round that aimed to control non-tariff barriers and voluntary export restrictions; 1973–79
