= New Zealand–Peru relations =

- New Zealand: Peru

New Zealand–Peru relations are the diplomatic relations between New Zealand and the Republic of Peru. New Zealand is represented in Peru through its embassy in Santiago, Chile and maintains an honorary consulate in Lima, while Peru has an embassy in Wellington. Both nations are members of Asia-Pacific Economic Cooperation, Cairns Group and the United Nations.

== History ==
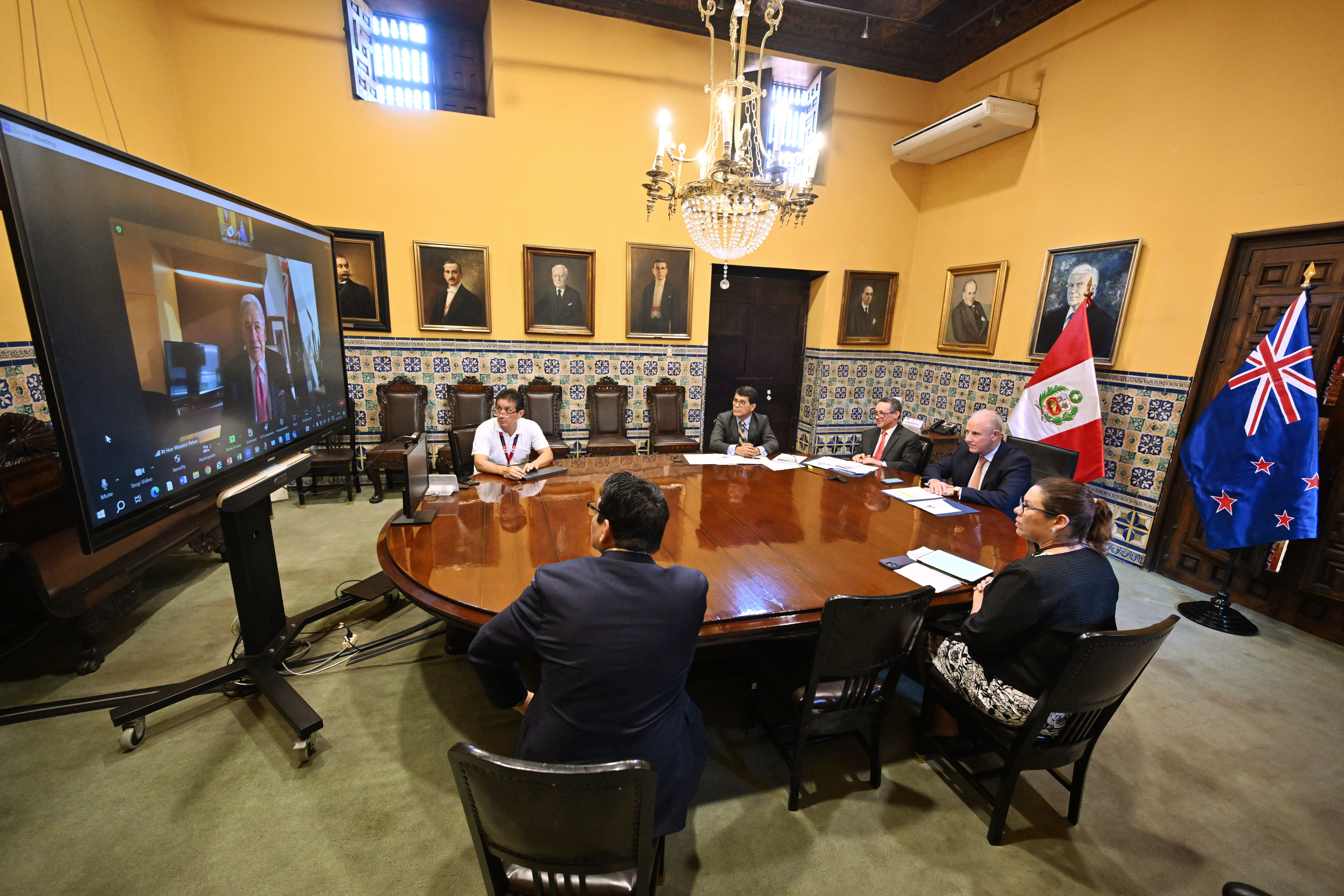
Minister of Foreign Affairs of Peru Javier González-Olaechea in a virtual meeting with New Zealand Minister of Foreign Affairs, Winston Peters, 20 March 2024.

In 1972, New Zealand and Peru established diplomatic relations. Soon afterwards, both nations opened resident embassies in their respective capitals. In 1990, New Zealand closed its embassy in Lima. In June 1998, Peruvian President Alberto Fujimori became the first Peruvian head-of-state to pay an official visit to New Zealand. President Fujimori returned to New Zealand in September 1999 to attend the 11th APEC summit being held in New Zealand.

In 2002, New Zealand Foreign Minister Phil Goff made an official visit to Peru. In November 2008, New Zealand Prime Minister John Key made an official visit to Peru to attend the 20th APEC Summit in Lima. In 2010, Peru closed its embassy in Wellington. In November 2016, Prime Minister Key returned to Peru to attend the 28th APEC Summit in Lima.

Since 2012, New Zealand has been an active observer of the Pacific Alliance which includes Peru, Colombia, Chile and Mexico. New Zealand launched negotiations towards a high-quality and comprehensive free trade agreement (FTA) with the Pacific Alliance in June 2017. Once negotiations are concluded and the FTA is in force, New Zealand will become an Associated State of the Pacific Alliance. In February 2018, Peru re-opened its embassy in Wellington.

== High-level visits ==
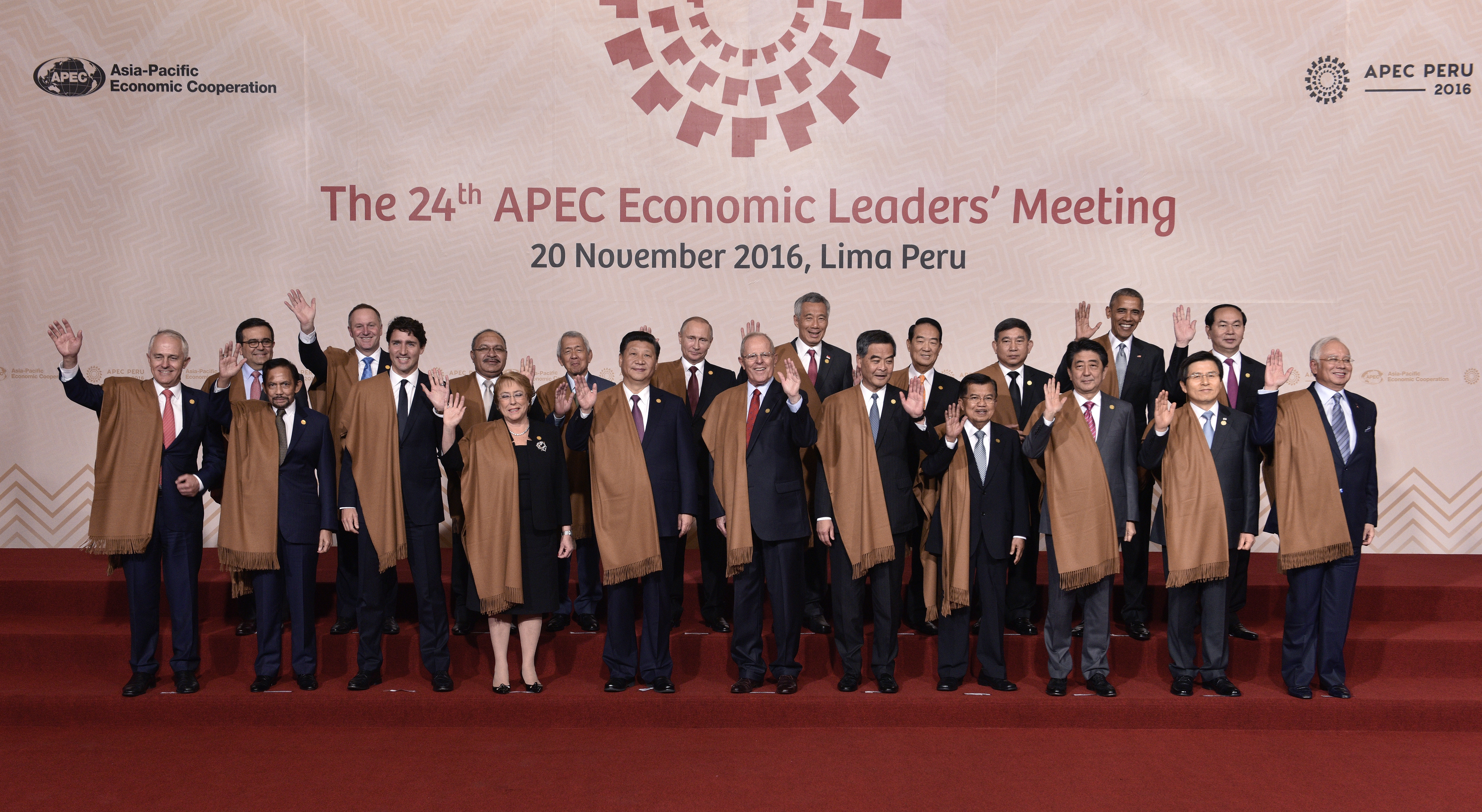
Peruvian President Pedro Pablo Kuczynski and New Zealand Prime Minister John Key attending the 29th APEC Summit in Lima; November 2016.

High-level visits from New Zealand to Peru

- Foreign Minister Don McKinnon (1998)
- Foreign Minister Phil Goff (2002)
- Prime Minister John Key (2008 & 2016)

High-level visits from Peru to New Zealand

- President Alberto Fujimori (1998 & 1999)

== Bilateral agreements ==
Both nations have signed a few bilateral agreements such as an Agreement of Technical Cooperation (1974); Agreement of High-Level Consultations (1998); Agreement on Joint Communications (1998); Working Holiday Agreement (2011) and an Air Services Agreement (2018).

== Trade ==
In 2016, trade between New Zealand and Peru totaled US$83 million. New Zealand's main exports to Peru include: dairy based products; food preparations; machinery and seafood. Peru's exports to New Zealand include: fats and fish oil concentrate; coffee; fan shells; mangos; Brazil nuts; canned asparagus; quinoa; and profiled wood.

== Resident diplomatic missions ==
- New Zealand is accredited to Peru from its embassy in Santiago, Chile and maintains an honorary consulate in Lima.
- Peru has an embassy in Wellington.

== See also ==
- Foreign relations of New Zealand
- Foreign relations of Peru
- List of ambassadors of Peru to New Zealand
- List of ambassadors of Peru to Australia
