= Peace Clause =

Agricultural trade agreement

Trade negotiators generally refer to Article 13 of the World Trade Organization's Agreement on Agriculture as the Peace Clause. Article 13 holds that domestic support measures and export subsidies of a WTO member that are legal under the Agreement on Agriculture cannot be challenged by other WTO members on grounds of being illegal under the provisions of another WTO agreement.

The Peace Clause expired on January 1, 2004. It is now possible, therefore, for developing countries and nations favoring free trade in agricultural goods, such as the Cairns Group, to use the WTO dispute settlement mechanism in order to challenge, in particular, U.S. and EU export subsidies on agricultural products.

Another temporary peace clause was made at the WTO Bali conference in December 2013. It stipulated that no country would be legally barred from food security programs for its own people even if the subsidy breached the limits specified in the WTO Agreement on Agriculture.
