= Cottonseed Oil Assistance Program =

US export bonus, 1989 to 1996

The Cottonseed Oil Assistance Program (COAP), along with the Sunflower Oil Assistance Program (SOAP), was one of two programs that awarded bonuses to exporters to assist in exports of U.S. vegetable oil to targeted markets. Funds for the programs were authorized to be made available under Section 32 of the Agricultural Adjustment Act of 1935 (P.L. 74-320). The provision in the Disaster Assistance Act of 1988 (P.L. 100–387) that authorized the COAP to begin in fiscal year 1989 expired at the end of fiscal year 1995. However, the USDA appropriations act for FY1996 (P.L. 104–37, October 21, 1995) provided authority to operate the program in fiscal year 1996. COAP was not reauthorized by the 1996 farm bill (P.L. 104–127), although export subsidies for cottonseed oil can be financed under the Export Enhancement Program (EEP).
