= Agreement on Agriculture =

International treaty of the World Trade Organization

The Agreement on Agriculture (AoA) is an international treaty of the World Trade Organization. It was negotiated during the Uruguay Round of the General Agreement on Tariffs and Trade, and entered into force with the establishment of the WTO on 1 January 1995.

== History ==
=== Origins ===
The idea of replacing agricultural price support with direct payments to farmers decoupled from production dates back to the late 1950s, when the twelfth session of the GATT Contracting Parties selected a Panel of Experts chaired by Gottfried Haberler to examine the effect of agricultural protectionism, fluctuating commodity prices and the failure of export earnings to keep pace with import demand in developing countries.

The 1958 Haberler Report stressed the importance of minimising the effect of agriculture subsidies on competitiveness and recommended replacing price support with direct supplementary payments not linked with production, anticipating discussion on green box subsidies. Only more recently, though, has this shift become the core of the reform of the global agricultural system.

=== Historical context ===
By the 1980s, government payments to agricultural producers in industrialised countries had caused large crop surpluses, which were unloaded on the world market by means of export subsidies, pushing food prices down. The fiscal burden of protective measures increased, due both to lower receipts from import duties and higher domestic expenditure. In the meantime, the global economy had entered a cycle of recession, and the perception that opening up markets could improve economic conditions led to calls for a new round of multilateral trade negotiations. The round would open up markets in services and high-technology goods, ultimately generating much needed efficiency gains. In order to engage developing countries, many of which were "demandeurs" of new international disciplines, agriculture, textiles, and clothing were added to the grand bargain.

In leading up to the 1986 GATT Ministerial Conference in Punta del Este, Uruguay, farm lobbies in developed countries strongly resisted compromises on agriculture. In this context, the idea of exempting production and "trade-neutral" subsidies from WTO commitments was first proposed by the United States in 1987, and echoed soon after by the EU. By guaranteeing farmers continued support, it also neutralised opposition. In exchange for bringing agriculture within the disciplines of the WTO and committing to future reduction of trade-distorting subsidies, developed countries would be allowed to retain subsidies that cause "not more than minimal trade distortion" in order to deliver various public policy objectives.

== Three pillars ==
The Agreement on Agriculture consists of three pillars — domestic support, market access, and export subsidies.

=== Domestic support ===
The first pillar of the Agreement on Agriculture is "domestic support". AoA divides domestic support into two categories: trade-distorting and non-trade-distorting (or minimally trade-distorting). The WTO Agreement on Agriculture negotiated in the Uruguay Round (1986–1994) includes the classification of subsidies by "boxes" depending on consequences of production and trade: amber (most directly linked to production levels), blue (production-limiting programmes that still distort trade), and green (minimal distortion). While payments in the amber box had to be reduced, those in the green box were exempt from reduction commitments. Detailed rules for green box payments are set out in Annex 2 of the AoA. However, all must comply with the "fundamental requirement" in paragraph 1, to cause not more than minimal distortion of trade or production, and must be provided through a government-funded programme that does not involve transfers from consumers or price support to producers.

The Agreement on Agriculture's domestic support system currently allows Europe and the United States to spend $380 billion a year on agricultural subsidies. The World Bank dismissed the EU and the United States' argument that small farmers needed protection, noting that more than half of the EU's Common Agricultural Policy subsidies go to 1% of producers while in the United States 70% of subsidies go to 10% of its producers, mainly agribusinesses. These subsidies end up flooding global markets with below-cost commodities, depressing prices, and undercutting producers in poor countries, a practice known as dumping.

=== Market access ===
Market access refers to the reduction of tariff (or non-tariff) barriers to trade by WTO members. The 1995 Agreement on Agriculture consists of tariff reductions of:

- 36% average reduction — developed countries — with a minimum of 15% per-tariff line reduction in next six years.
- 24% average reduction — developing countries — with a minimum of 10% per-tariff line reduction in next ten years.

Least developed countries (LDCs) were exempt from tariff reductions, but they either had to convert non-tariff barriers to tariffs — a process called tariffication — or "bind" their tariffs, creating a ceiling that could not be increased in future.

=== Export subsidies ===
Export subsidies are the third pillar. The 1995 Agreement on Agriculture required developed countries to reduce export subsidies by at least 36% (by value) or by 21% (by volume) over six years. For developing countries, the agreement required cuts were 24% (by value) and 14% (by volume) over ten years.

== Criticism ==
The Agreement has been criticised by civil society groups for reducing tariff protections for small farmers, a key source of income in developing countries, while simultaneously allowing rich countries to continue subsidizing agriculture at home.

The Agreement was criticised by NGOs for categorizing subsidies into trade-distorting domestic subsidies (the "amber box"), which have to be reduced, and non-trade-distorting subsidies (blue and green boxes), which escape discipline and thus can be increased. As efficient agricultural exporters press WTO members to reduce their trade-distorting "amber box" and "blue box" support, developed countries' green box spending has increased.

A 2009 book by the International Centre for Trade and Sustainable Development (ICTSD) showed how green box subsidies distorted trade, affecting developing country farmers and harming the environment. While some green box payments only had a minor effect on production and trade, others have a significant impact. According to countries' latest official reports to the WTO, the United States provided $76 billion (more than 90% of total spending) in green box payments in 2007, while the European Union notified €48 billion ($91 billion) in 2005, around half of all support. The EU's large and growing green box spending was decoupled from income support, which could lead to a significant impact on production and trade.

Third World Network stated, "This has allowed the rich countries to maintain or raise their very high subsidies by switching from one kind of subsidy to another...This is why after the Uruguay Round the total amount of subsidies in OECD countries have gone up instead of going down, despite the apparent promise that Northern subsidies will be reduced." Moreover, Martin Khor argued that the green and blue box subsidies can be just as trade-distorting — as "the protection is better disguised, but the effect is the same".

At the 2005 WTO meeting in Hong Kong, countries agreed to eliminate export subsidy and equivalent payments by 2013. However, Oxfam argued that EU export subsidies comprise for only 3.5% of its overall agricultural support. United States, removed export subsidies for cotton which only covers 10% of overall spending.

on 18 July 2017 India and China jointly submitted a proposal to the World Trade Organization (WTO) calling for the elimination — by developed countries — of the most trade-distorting form of farm subsidies, known in WTO parlance as Aggregate Measurement of Support (AMS) or 'Amber Box' support as a prerequisite for consideration of other reforms in domestic support negotiations.

== Mechanisms for developing countries ==
During the Doha negotiations, developing countries have fought to protect their interest and population, afraid of competing on the global market with strong developed and exporting economies. In many countries large populations living in rural areas, with limited access to infrastructure, farming resources and few employment alternatives. Thus, these countries are concerned that domestic rural populations employed in import-competing sectors might be negatively affected by further trade liberalization, becoming increasingly vulnerable to market instability and import surges as tariff barriers are removed. Several mechanisms have been suggested in order to preserve those countries: the Special Safeguard Mechanism (SSM) and treatment of Special Products (SPs).

=== Special Safeguard Mechanism ===
A Special Safeguard Mechanism (SSM) would allow developing countries to impose additional safety measures in the event of an abnormal surge in imports or the entry of unusually cheap imports. Debates have arisen around this question, some negotiating parties claiming that SSM could be repeatedly and excessively invoked, distorting trade. In turn, the G33 bloc of developing countries, a major SSM proponent, has argued that breaches of bound tariffs should not be ruled out if the SSM is to be an effective remedy. A 2010 study by the International Centre for Trade and Sustainable Development simulated the consequences of SSM on global trade for both developed and developing countries.

=== Special Products ===
At 2005 WTO Ministerial Conference in Hong Kong, WTO members agreed to allow developing countries to assign or make appropriate list of products for tariff lines as Special Products (SPs) based on "food security, livelihood security and rural development".

== See also ==
- Agricultural policy of the United States
- Cairns Group
- Common Agricultural Policy
- Dumping (pricing policy)
- Peace Clause
- UN Sustainable Development Goals
