= South Africa–Thailand relations =

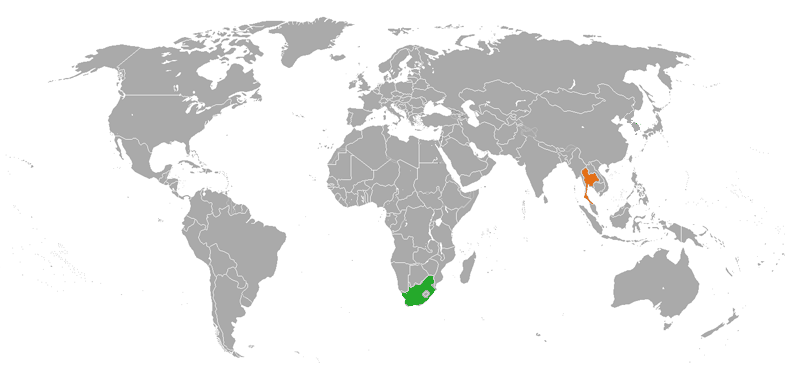
- South Africa: Thailand

Diplomatic mission
- Embassy of South Africa, Bangkok: Royal Thai Embassy, Pretoria

South Africa and Thailand established bilateral relations in 1993. Both countries are members of the Non-Aligned Movement, Group of 77, Cairns Group, G20 developing nations and the Indian-Ocean Rim Association.

== History ==
During the Cold War, South Africa and Thailand were both members of the Western bloc and actively supported the anti-communist front. However, the Thai government opposed South Africa's apartheid policies, therefore the two nations never established formal diplomatic ties

Following the end of the Cold War, Executive State President Frederik Willem de Klerk ended the apartheid regime and started mending relations with other nations, including Thailand. The two nations established consular relations on 9 March 1992 and decided to open general consulates in each other's major cities. The two nations established diplomatic relations at the ambassadorial level on December 9 of the following year, and ever since then, their relations have grown.

In July 1997, President Nelson Mandela of South Africa made a two-day state visit to Thailand. In 1999, Princess Chulabhorn of Thailand paid a visit to South Africa as the featured speaker at the International Conference on "Women, Science and Technology for Sustainable Human Development" and the Second Conference of the Third World Women's Science Organization.

Thailand promised support, anticipating stronger cooperation, in recognition of South Africa's achievement as the first African nation to be granted Sectoral Dialogue Partner status with the Association of Southeast Asian Nations on 11 July 2023. Thailand also praised South Africa for actively chairing the Foreign Policy and Global Health Initiative (FPGH), providing ongoing assistance and aiming to share its effective Universal Health Coverage program.

== Economic relations ==
With more than $3.2 billion in two-way commerce in 2017, Thailand is regarded as South Africa's greatest commercial partner in Southeast Asia, and South Africa is Thailand's major trading partner in Africa. Thailand sought to collaborate closely with South Africa in 2018 hoping to boost investment and trade in sectors that would benefit both nations, such as the hotel, agricultural, and automotive industries.

Total exports from Thailand to South Africa reached $2.01 billion in 2020. Thailand's primary exports include agricultural goods like rice and industrial goods like internal combustion engines and car parts. After Egypt and Angola, South Africa is Thailand's third-largest African import partner with $473 million in exports. Thailand is the primary destination for South Africa's exports of centrifuges, chemicals, and aluminum ore.

== Diaspora ==
In 2012, around 3500 Thais reside in South Africa.

== Agreements ==
Bilateral documents
Date	Sign	Remark
1993	Aviation Services Agreement	
1993	Visa Exemption Agreement for Ordinary Passports	
1996	Agreement for the Avoidance of Double Taxation and the Prevention of Fiscal Evasion	
1999	Agreement on Visa Exemption for Diplomatic and Official Passports	
2001	Bilateral Trade Agreement	
2003	Joint Statement on the Establishment of the Joint Trade Commission	

== Diplomatic missions ==
- South Africa opened a consulate-general in Bangkok in September 1992. It was elevated to an embassy in 1993.
- Thailand opened a consulate-general in Johannesburg on 9 October 1992. The Thai government closed the consulate-general and opened an embassy in Pretoria in 1993 as the two nations established diplomatic ties at an ambassadorial level.

== See also ==
- Foreign relations of South Africa
- Foreign relations of Thailand
