= List of ambassadors of Peru to New Zealand =

Ambassador of Peru to New Zealand
- Great Seal of Peru
- Ministry of Foreign Affairs
- Style: His or Her Excellency
- Appointer: The president of Peru
- Website: Embassy of Peru in New Zealand

The extraordinary and plenipotentiary ambassador of Peru to New Zealand is the official representative of the Republic of Peru to New Zealand.

Both countries established relations on June 1, 1972. Peru maintained an embassy in Wellington until its closure in 2010. The ambassador in Canberra became accredited to New Zealand until the reopening of the embassy in 2019.

== List of representatives ==
Name	Portrait	Term begin	Term end	President	Notes
Gustavo Barreda Moller		1972		Juan Velasco Alvarado	Ambassador to Australia; accredited to New Zealand from Canberra. He presented his credentials on February 13, 1973.
Enrique Fernández de Paredes Cabello		1975	1981	Juan Velasco Alvarado	Ambassador to Australia; accredited to New Zealand from Canberra.
Gonzalo Bedoya Delboy		1987	1989	Alan García	Ambassador to Australia; accredited to New Zealand from Canberra.
Raúl Pinto		1989	?	Alan García	
Javier León Olavarría		2002	2006	Alejandro Toledo	As ambassador.
Carlos Rodolfo Zapata López		2007	2010	Alan García	Last ambassador before the closure of the embassy in Wellington in 2010.
Luis Felipe Quesada Incháustegui		2011	2015	Ollanta Humala	Ambassador to Australia; accredited to New Zealand from Canberra.
Miguel Julián Palomino de la Gala		2015	2021	Pedro Pablo Kuczynski	Ambassador to Australia; accredited to New Zealand from Canberra.
Javier Augusto Prado Miranda		April 15, 2019	2021	Martín Vizcarra	First Ambassador after the reopening of the embassy. The presentation of his credentials took place on April 18, 2019.
José Emilio Bustinza Soto		April 6, 2022	2026	Francisco Sagasti	As ambassador.

== See also ==
- List of ambassadors of New Zealand to Peru
- List of ambassadors of Peru to Australia
