= Export Enhancement Program =

The Export Enhancement Program (EEP) is a program that the United States Department of Agriculture (USDA) initiated in May 1985 under the Commodity Credit Corporation Charter Act to help U.S. exporters meet competitors’ subsidized prices in targeted markets. The program currently is authorized through 2007 under the 2002 farm bill (P.L. 107–171). Under EEP, exporters are awarded cash payments that enable an exporter to sell certain commodities to specified countries at competitive prices. EEP program activity is constrained by annual dollar and tonnage limits on commodities that can be subsidized, as agreed to under the Uruguay Round Agreement on Agriculture, and these annual limits are incorporated into the EEP authorizing legislation. In practice, the program has been used very little since the mid-1990s.
