= Tariffication =

Proposal on agricultural import controls

Tariffication is an effort to convert all existing agricultural non-tariff barriers to trade (NTBs) into bound tariffs and to reduce these tariffs over time. A bound tariff is one which has a "ceiling" beyond which it cannot be increased.

== Economic issues ==
The main economic issues that arise with tariffication stem from the nonequivalence of tariffs in NTBs in a number of scenarios. The issue analyzes nonequivalence arising from the existence of imperfect competition in importing countries, price instability in importing and exporting countries, and inefficient allocation of quantitative restrictions. It is shown that in all these cases the definition of an appropriate "equivalent tariff" to be used in tariffication is not straightforward, and that in general this equivalent tariff cannot be computed on the basis of only observed price differences between countries. Tariff-rate quotas, which are meant to be the main tool in implement tariffication according to the existing proposal, are analyzed in some detail. Concerning the relationship between tariffication and the other elements of the trade liberalization package, it is shown that tariffication would limit the scope of export subsidy policies, and that the existence of production and export subsidies makes observed price gaps between countries of questionable value in setting equivalent tariff levels. Finally, it is argued that the main focus on tariffication should be the conversion of NTBs to acceptable long-run (bound) tariffs rates, and considerable flexibility in the conversion process could be exercised during the transition period.

== Controversy ==
Some pressure groups believe that tariffs are both necessary and desirable and should remain in place permanently in order to protect indigenous industries.

In the Philippines, the secretary of the Department of Agriculture warned that the Rice Tariffication Law could lead to the death of the country's rice industry. The National Food Authority stated that the law would allow private traders or companies to import rice without being subject to regulation to stabilize prices, leading to uncontrolled increases in the price of rice. Research group Ibon Foundation said that non-quota tariff rice importation threatens food security and self-sufficiency in the Philippines. The group also said that tariffication will not ensure the stability of rice supply and instead will cause the price of rice to increase. Farmer's organization Kilusang Magbubukid ng Pilipinas estimates that the livelihood of some 500,000 of country's farmers will be affected by the tariffication of rice imports.

== See also ==
- Infant industry argument
