= Cairns Group =

Organization of agricultural exporting countries

Cairns Group of Fair Trading Nations
- Cairns Group countries in blue
- Type: Agricultural exporting countries
- Members: 20 Countries: Argentina; Australia; Brazil; Canada; Chile; Colombia; Costa Rica; Guatemala; Indonesia; Malaysia; New Zealand; Pakistan; Paraguay; Peru; Philippines; South Africa; Thailand; Ukraine; Uruguay; Vietnam
- Website www.cairnsgroup.org

The Cairns Group (Cairns Group of Fair Trading Nations) is an interest group of 20 agricultural exporting countries, composed of: Argentina, Australia, Brazil, Canada, Chile, Colombia, Costa Rica, Guatemala, Indonesia, Malaysia, New Zealand, Pakistan, Paraguay, Peru, Philippines, South Africa, Thailand, Ukraine, Uruguay, and Vietnam.

The Cairns Group seeks to liberalize global trade in agricultural produce. In particular, its members aim to abolish export subsidies and trade-distorting ("amber box") domestic support for agricultural products and seek to improve market access for agricultural exports. The coalition attempts to present a common front in multilateral trade negotiations at the World Trade Organization (WTO), tabling joint proposals and occasionally working with like-minded groups such as the G20 group of developing nations.

== History ==
=== Founding ===
The Cairns Group was founded in August 1986, when the Australian government spearheaded the formation of a group and organized the inaugural meeting in the city of Cairns, Australia. There were 14 original member countries—Argentina, Australia, Brazil, Canada, Chile, Colombia, Fiji, Hungary, Indonesia, Malaysia, New Zealand, the Philippines, Thailand, and Uruguay—a very diverse group politically and economically. The Australian government led the formation of the group, though some of the South East Asian countries had been working together on agricultural trade through ASEAN. "One of the most striking aspects of the Cairns Group was the intellectual leadership provided by Australia and to a lesser extent Canada. Australia's commitment to trade liberalization was the outcome of a long domestic debate in which neoliberal ideas had supplanted protectionism and become the guiding rationale of foreign and domestic policy. The Cairns Group offered a mechanism to promote this agenda in a key multilateral forum."

The move to form the group was largely a response to spiralling trade subsidies of the European Union's Common Agricultural Policy and the United States' Export Enhancement Program. Particularly, the objection came to the double standards between the General Agreement on Tariffs and Trade (GATT) forcing countries to liberalise their economies, whilst the United States was granted a waiver for agricultural protection in the 1950s.

=== Uruguay Round ===
The Cairns Group successfully forced agriculture onto the agenda of the Uruguay Round, which eventually led to the Agreement on Agriculture. In April 1989 in Geneva, Switzerland, the Group played a critical role in the framework agreement with United States, the EU, and Japan to cover negotiations during the remainder of the Round.

=== Continued protectionism ===
In the ongoing Doha Round of trade negotiations, they are mainly opposed by WTO members seeking to uphold their high level of agricultural protection on grounds of public policy, such as the EU, Japan, Norway, South Korea, Switzerland, and United States (dubbed the "multifunctionalists").

The Group's newest member is Vietnam, which joined in November 2013 as its 20th member.

After its December 2013 meeting in Bali, Indonesia, the Cairns Group issued a communiqué stating its concern about "the trend of import restrictions" that go against the Agreement on the Application of Sanitary and Phytosanitary Measures and serve as technical barriers to trade on agricultural products. It criticized "overly complex SPS measures and technical regulations, including food labelling".
