= Multifunctionality in agriculture =

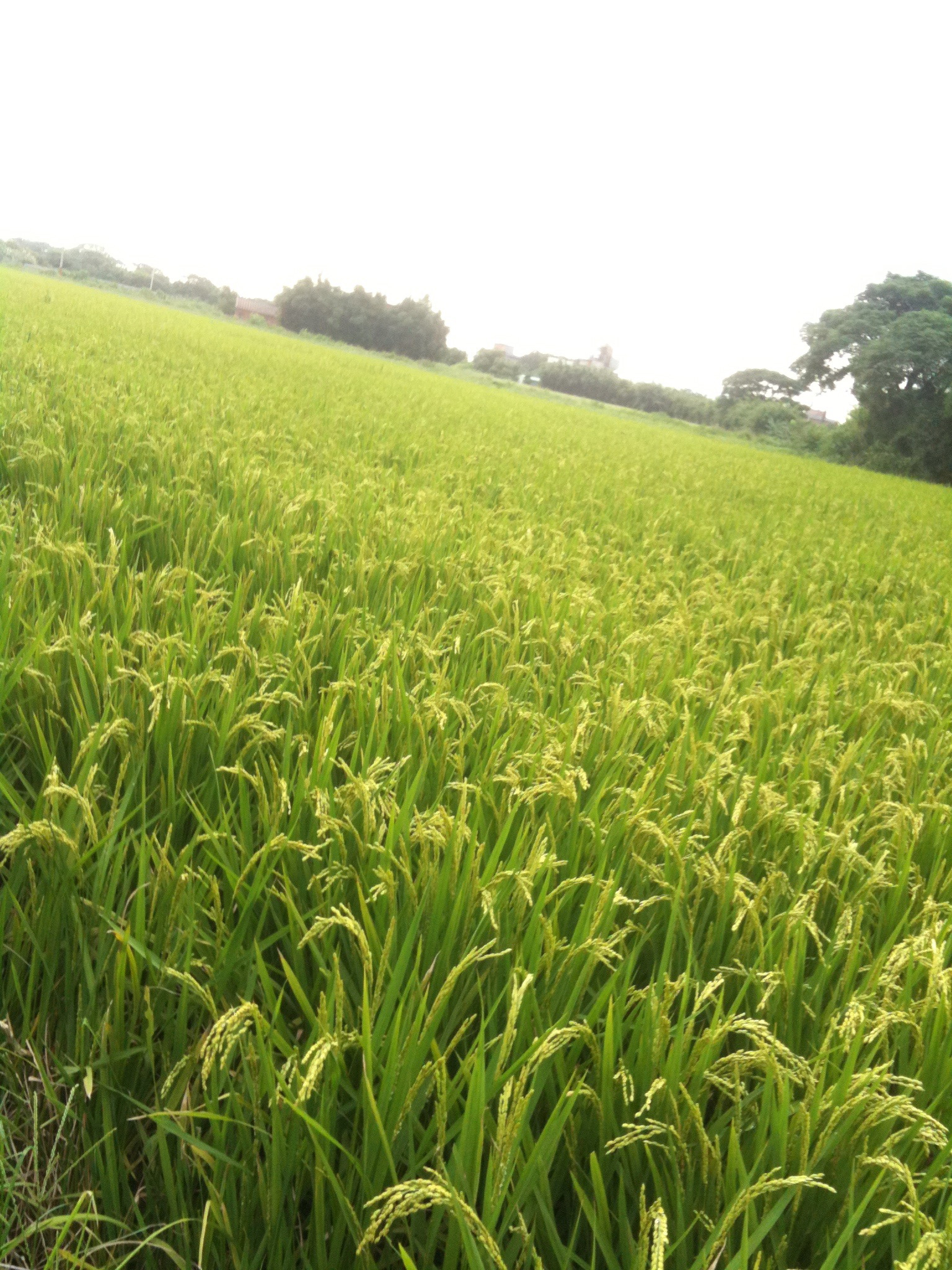
Rice fields in Fugangli, Yangmei City, Taoyuan County.

Multifunctionality in agriculture (often simply multifunctionality) refers to the numerous benefits that agricultural policies may provide for a country or region. Generally speaking, multifunctionality refers to the non-trade benefits of agriculture, that is, benefits other than commerce and food production. These include, in the WTO definition of multifunctionality, environmental protection, landscape preservation, rural employment, and food security. These can be broadly classified as benefits to society, culture, a national economy as a whole, national security, and other concerns. For example, in addition to providing food and plant-derived products for the population, agriculture may also provide jobs for rural people and contribute to the viability of the area, create a more stable food supply, and provide other desired environmental and rural outputs. A nice and clear summary of how more species may support multiple ecosystem functions and the state of biodiversity-ecosystem function research can be found by Slade et al.

== Multifunctionality and agricultural policies ==
The numerous externalities, both positive and negative, which are associated with agriculture are important considerations for policy makers. Sometimes current agricultural practices and markets produce too much of an undesired effect or not enough of a desired one. Governments may step in to correct such market failures with policies designed to either encourage or discourage a certain practice. However, individual policies may carry consequences for other policies and for other countries. Such policies are therefore a major topic of discussion in the international community.

Removing protectionist policies on agriculture is one step that may need to be taken for a country to maximize positive externalities, minimize negative ones, and make sure that the mixture of outputs derived from agriculture corresponds to the needs of society. However, removing agricultural supports is often cause for consternation among public officials, who may predict the loss of certain positive externalities of the policies already in place. At the same time, officials may fear the implementation of new market protections in other countries which are trying to promote the production of such outputs of agriculture. In such cases, advocates for free trade, such as the OECD recommend that countries reduce as much as possible their agricultural protections and institute policies which specifically target the production of the positive non-commodity outputs.

To help countries formulate their agricultural policies, the OECD has established a framework for analyzing non-commodity outputs of agricultural activities. When analyzing the multifunctionality of agriculture and the appropriate policies to implement, there are several concepts that need to be considered. The first of these is jointness, or the extent to which the intended agricultural product and the incidental non-commodity outputs of agricultural activity are linked. The production of some non-commodity outputs may be inseparable from agricultural commodity outputs while others may be produced independently of agricultural activity. The goal is to separate agricultural commodities and non-commodity outputs as much as possible. The next issue to be addressed is whether or not the production or non-production of the non-commodity output in question constitutes a market failure. If there is no market failure, there is no need for a policy to correct it. Finally, policy makers should examine the characteristics of the output in question since it may have both a degree of market failure and jointness associated with it. After considering the matter from these three perspectives, policy makers may find non-governmental ways of addressing dealing with non-commodity outputs or make changes in their agricultural policies.

== WTO trade discussions ==
In agricultural trade discussions in the WTO, the EU and Japan, among others, argue that multifunctionality justifies continued protection and subsidization of agriculture. The United States and the Cairns Group argue that support of multifunctionality should be specific, targeted, and provided in a non-trade distorting manner.
