= List of ambassadors of Peru to Australia =

Ambassador of Peru to Australia
- Great Seal of Peru

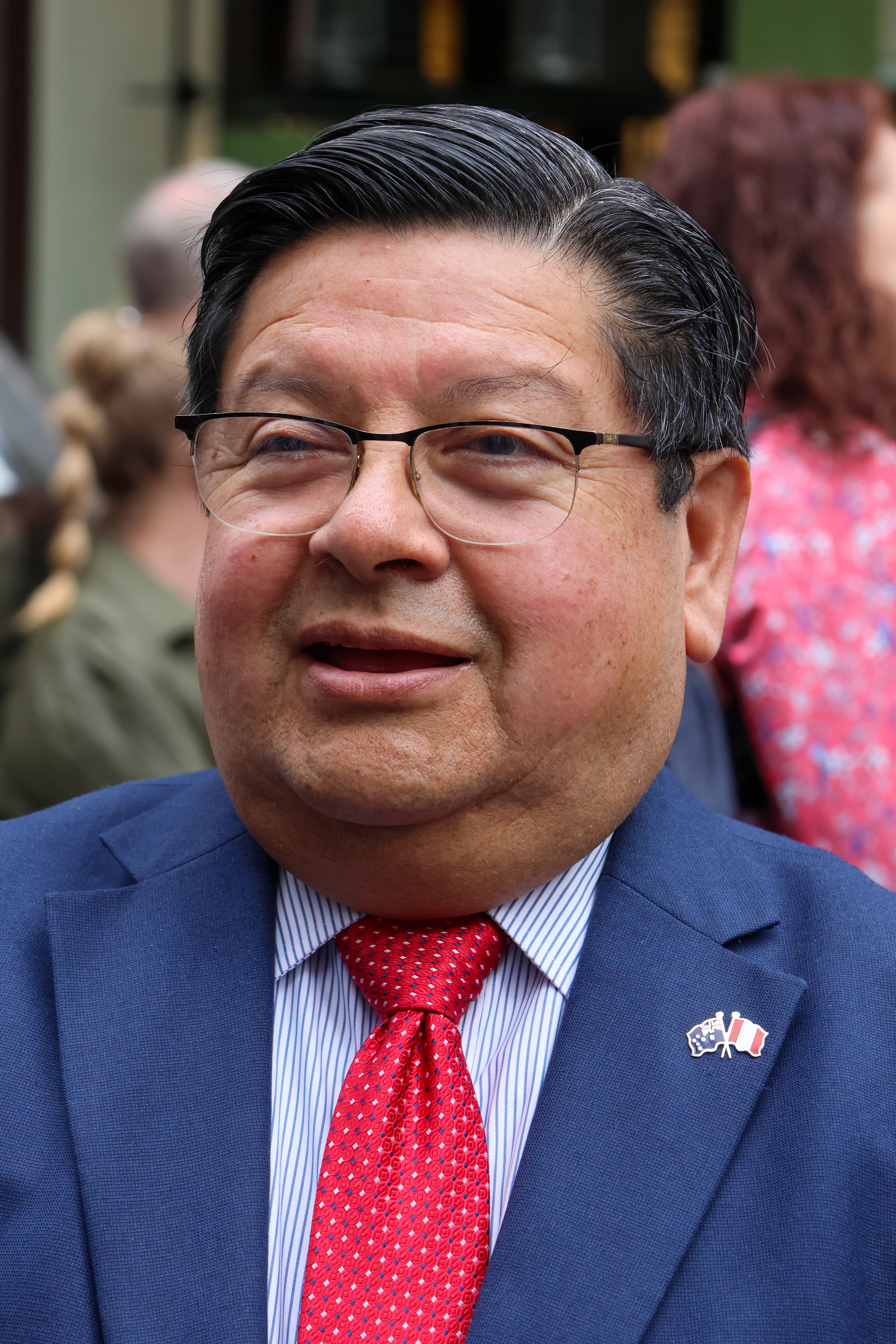
- Incumbent; Vitaliano Gaspar Gallardo Valencia since February 10, 2022
- Ministry of Foreign Affairs
- Style: His or Her Excellency
- Appointer: The president of Peru
- Website: Embassy of Peru in Australia

The extraordinary and plenipotentiary ambassador of Peru to Australia is the official representative of the Republic of Peru to Australia.

The ambassador in Australia is generally accredited to neighbouring countries in Oceania, such as New Zealand (until 2019), the Cook Islands, Fiji, Tonga, Papua New Guinea and Vanuatu.

Both countries established relations on March 1, 1963, and have maintained them since. The ambassador to Australia was also accredited to New Zealand until an embassy was opened in Wellington, which closed in 2010 but reopened in 2019.

== List of representatives ==
Name	Portrait	Term begin	Term end	President	Notes
Gustavo Barreda Moller		1971		Juan Velasco Alvarado	Ambassador; accredited to New Zealand from Canberra since 1972.
Enrique Fernández de Paredes Cabello		1975	1981	Juan Velasco Alvarado	Ambassador; accredited to New Zealand from Canberra.
Armando Lecaros de Cossío		1984	March 1986	Fernando Belaúnde	Minister plenipotentiary, then ambassador.
Gonzalo Bedoya Delboy		1987	?	Alan García	Ambassador; accredited to New Zealand from Canberra.
José Luis Garaycochea Bustamante		1997	2002	Alberto Fujimori	Ambassador; accredited to Papua New Guinea, Fiji and Tonga.
Martha Toledo-Ocampo Ureña		2003	February 15, 2005	Alejandro Toledo	As ambassador.
Claudio Julio de la Puente Ribeyro		2005	2010	Alejandro Toledo	As ambassador.
Luis Felipe Quesada Incháustegui		2011	2015	Ollanta Humala	Ambassador to Australia; accredited to New Zealand from Canberra.
Miguel Julián Palomino de la Gala		2015	2021	Pedro Pablo Kuczynski	Ambassador to Australia; accredited to New Zealand from Canberra.
Vitaliano Gaspar Gallardo Valencia		February 10, 2022	Incumbent	Pedro Castillo	As ambassador; concurrent with Fiji and Vanuatu.

== See also ==
- List of ambassadors of Peru to New Zealand
