= Export subsidy =

Government policy to encourage export

Export subsidy is a government policy to encourage export of goods and discourage sale of goods on the domestic market through direct payments, low-cost loans, tax relief for exporters, or government-financed international advertising. An export subsidy reduces the price paid by foreign importers, which means domestic consumers pay more than foreign consumers. The World Trade Organization (WTO) prohibits most subsidies directly linked to the volume of exports, except for LDCs. Incentives are given by the government of a country to exporters to encourage export of goods.

Export subsidies are also generated when internal price supports, as in a guaranteed minimum price for a commodity, create more production than can be consumed internally in the country. (These price supports are often coupled with import tariffs, which keeps the domestic price high by discouraging or taxing imports on the difference between the world price and the mandatory minimum.) Instead of letting the commodity rot or destroying it, the government exports it. Saudi Arabia is a net exporter of wheat, Japan often is a net exporter of rice.

At the WTO's Tenth Ministerial Conference, which was held in Nairobi, Kenya from 15 to 19 December 2015, the WTO member states agreed to eliminate export subsidies for agricultural products; least-developed nations had until the end of 2018 to eliminate agricultural export subsidies (until 1 January 2017 in relation to cotton exports), while developed nations agreed to eliminate most such subsidies immediately.

Export subsidies can cause inflation: the government subsidises the industry based on costs, but an increase in the subsidy is directly spent on wage hikes demanded by employees. Now the wages in the subsidised industry are higher than elsewhere, which causes the other employees demand higher wages, which are then reflected in prices, resulting in inflation everywhere in the economy.

Some countries provide indirect export subsidies in the form of tax reductions. In the United States closely held exporters of U.S. made goods may get a reduction of tax using an Interest Charge Domestic International Sales Corporation (IC-DISC). Another example is Armenia. According to Armenian legislation, IT companies that suit several criteria are getting 50% of the income tax they have paid back. In 2022, after the drastic revaluation of Armenian Dram against US Dollar, which could potentially harm exporting industries, a proposal has been put into discussion to return the entire amount of tax paid by IT companies during the previous 4 months.
