= Trade and development =

Trade as a factor and driver of economic development

Trade can be a key factor in economic development. The prudent use of trade can boost a country's development and create absolute gains for the trading partners involved. Trade has been touted as an important tool in the path to development by prominent economists. However trade may not be a panacea for development as important questions surrounding how free trade really is and the harm trade can cause domestic infant industries to come into play.

== Importance ==
The current consensus is that trade, development, and poverty reduction are intimately linked. Sustained economic growth over longer periods is associated with poverty reduction, while trade and growth are linked. Countries that develop invariably increase their integration with the global economy. while export-led growth has been a key part of many countries' successful development strategies.

Continents, countries and sectors that have not developed and remain largely poor have comparative advantage in three main areas:

- natural resource exploitation, i.e. running down of natural capital such as rain forest timber;
- low-education labor-intensive manufacturing, due to high population densities and little suitable land per person;
- agriculture, due to low population densities and relatively large areas of suitable land per person.

Crucially for poverty reduction, the latter two at least are labor-intensive, helping to ensure that growth in these sectors will be poverty-reducing. However, low value-added, price instability and sustainability in these commodity sectors means they should be used only temporarily and as stepping stones in the path to economic development.

== Digital trade ==
=== Digital Trade for Development 2023 Report ===
In 2023, the "Digital Trade for Development" report by the IMF, OECD, UNCTAD, The World Bank, and the WTO detailed the influence of digital trade on developing economies. It highlighted the necessity of international cooperation to maximize digital trade benefits and tackle associated challenges.

Key statistics from the report include:

- Digitally delivered services have grown nearly fourfold since 2005, with an annual growth rate of 8.1% from 2005 to 2022, accounting for 54% of total services exports by 2022.
- Less developed regions like Africa hold less than 1% of the global share of digitally delivered services exports.
- About 67% of the global population, or 5.4 billion people, were online in 2022, but 2.6 billion remain offline, mostly in lower-income countries.
- Aid for Trade commitments to the ICT sector were around US$ 2.16 billion for 2021-22.
- By the end of 2022, 116 regional trade agreements included digital trade provisions, representing 33% of all such agreements.

== Agriculture ==
In many developing countries, agriculture employs a large proportion of the labor force, while food consumption accounts for a large share of household income. The United Nations Conference on Trade and Development (UNCTAD) notes that this means that “even small changes in agricultural employment opportunities, or prices, can have major socio-economic effects in developing countries”. Thus whatever the development strategy a particular country adopts, the role of agriculture will often be crucial. In 1994, the agricultural sector employed over 70% of the labor force in low-income countries, 30% in middle-income countries, and only 4% in high-income countries (UNCTAD 1999).

In poor countries with low population densities and enough suitable land area, which includes most countries in Africa and Latin America, agriculture is central to the economy. In poor regions and rural areas within middle-income developing countries, the concentration of poverty in rural areas of otherwise better-off developing countries makes the development of agriculture vital there. Finally, in Net Food Importing Developing Countries (NFIDCs), there is a positive link between growing agricultural exports and increases in local food production, which makes agricultural development if anything even more important, as food security and the financial stability of the government are also at stake. In Vietnam in the 1990s, increases in production and export of coffee of 15% a year contributed to a nearly 50% rise in food production in the same period. As agricultural GDP grew 4.6% per year, rural poverty fell from 66% in 1993 to 45% in 1998 (Global Economic Prospects 2002:40).

Anderson et al. (1999) estimate annual welfare losses of $19.8 billion for developing countries from agricultural tariffs – even after Uruguay Round reforms. This is three times the loss from OECD import restrictions on textiles and clothing. A combination of better market access, and domestic reforms and foreign aid to enhance the ability of developing countries to take advantage of it, could have a significant impact on poverty reduction, and help to meet the Millennium Development Goals.

The largest beneficiaries of agricultural liberalization would be OECD countries themselves: welfare losses of $62.9bn a year are estimated as resulting from the distortionary policies (Binswanger and Ernst 1999:5). Nor is the traditional objective of OECD agricultural subsidy (supporting small farmers) achieved by this system in a manner that could be characterised as efficient: most of the producer support incomes goes to better-off farmers, with the poorest 40% receiving just 8% of the support spent.

== Market access ==
=== Market access to developed countries ===
The issue of market access to high-income countries is a thorny but crucial one. The issues fall into three main groups: first, those relating to deliberately imposed barriers to trade, such as tariffs, quotas, and tariff escalation. Second, barriers to trade resulting from domestic and external producer support, primarily in the form of subsidies, but also including, for example, export credits. Third, those relating to indirect barriers to trade resulting from developing countries’ lack of institutional capacity to engage in the global economy and in multilateral institutions (e.g., the World Trade Organization) on equal terms.

==== Barriers to trade ====
- High tariffs are imposed on agriculture: in high-income countries, the average tariff rate on agriculture is almost double the tariff for manufactures. And more than one third of the European Union's agricultural tariff lines, for instance, carry duties above 15% . Tariff peaks within agriculture occur most frequently on processed products and temperate commodities, rather than the major export crops of least developed countries (unprocessed fruits and vegetables and tropical commodities). However, many developing countries in temperate zones have the potential of competing as lower-cost producers in temperate commodities. Thus liberalization could open up new development-through-trade possibilities.
- Strong tariff escalation is typically imposed on agricultural and food products by high-income countries. This strongly discourages the development of high value added exports, and hinders diversification in particular as well as development in general. In high-income countries, tariffs on agricultural products escalate steeply, especially in the EU and Japan. ('Tariff escalation' is the imposition of higher import tariffs on processed products than the tariffs applied to unprocessed ingredients.)
- Complex tariffs make it more difficult for developing country exporters to access industrialised-country markets because of the disadvantages developing countries face in accessing, and in their capacity to process, information. Not only are price signals distorted, they are often unclear, subject to change (for example seasonally) and difficult to interpret.
- Tariff-rate quotas (TRQs), introduced by the Uruguay Round with the aim of securing a minimum level of market access, have performed poorly. Average fill rates have been low and declining, from 67% in 1995 to 63% in 1998, with about a quarter of TRQs filled to less than 20%. The low fill rate may reflect high in-quota rates. Overall, the UR tariffication process which produced them has not resulted in the increased market access developing countries hoped for.

==== Producer support ====
- Support to agricultural producers remains sizable, at about five times the level of international development assistance - $245 billion in 2000. Total support to agriculture, as defined by the OECD, reaches $327 billion - 1.3% of OECD countries’ GDP. To some extent these can be justified by “multifunctionality” arguments, but it remains a priority to find means of support which effectively meet the primary objectives without the negative developmental and environmental consequences that have been seen in the past.
- The dumping of unwanted production surpluses onto the world market through export subsidies has depressed prices for many temperate agricultural commodities, with EU surpluses of exportable wheat a prime example. (Despite several Common Agricultural Policy reforms, domestic support for wheat - as measured by OECD producer support estimates - declined only marginally from an average 52% of gross farm receipts in 1986-88, to around 48% in 1998-2000. ) The URAA has been relatively unsuccessful in disciplining export subsidies, with the proportion of subsidised exports in total exports increasing in many products of export interest for developing countries: for example for wheat, from 7% in 1995 to 25% in 1998. The cost to developing country production and exports is considerable, and only partially offset by the lower food prices available to NFIDC consumers. This form of transfer from high-income country taxpayers to low-income consumers is in any case rather inefficient, and the lower prices may harm production for local consumption even in NFIDCs. Agricultural reform as a whole, including the removal of export subsidies, would only result in quite small price rises for developing-country consumers.
- The counter-cyclical nature of producer support is also harmful to developing-country producers. High-income farmers are insulated from changes in world prices, making production less responsive to swings in demand. As a result, world commodity prices are more volatile, and the burden of adjustment falls disproportionately on developing-country producers.

==== Lack of capacity ====
This includes non-tariff barriers such as food regulations and standards, which developing countries are often not (or not effectively) involved in setting, and which may be deliberately used to reduce competition from developing countries. In any case, the lack of capacity to meet implement regulations and ensure compliance with standards constitutes a barrier to trade, and must be met by increasing that capacity.

Researchers at the Overseas Development Institute have identified many capacity related issues that developing economies face aside from tariff barriers:

1. Traders and potential traders must know about an agreement and its details, however, the interests and skills of good producers lie in production and not in legal rules, only the largest firms can afford policy advisers.
2. Markets and suppliers must share information - producer associations, industrial organisations, and chambers of commerce exchange information among their members and this information exchange must then take place across borders (as seen between Brazil and Argentina after Mercosur).
3. A successful agreement must be flexible and governments need to accept that it will need to evolve.
4. Trade agreements must generate relevant reforms in areas such as customs documentation, but also more fundamentally in relaxing rules for cross-border transportation.
5. Selling to new markets requires adequate finance.
6. Poor or wrong infrastructure can restrict trade
7. Governments can support producers or traders in other ways.

The benefits of trade agreements for developing countries are not automatic, especially for SMEs whether or not they are already exporting as the costs of entering a new market are greater for them than for large companies when compared to their potential revenue.

=== Market access to developing countries ===
- Average applied tariffs in agriculture are higher in developing countries (although most of the very high rates, over 100%, are found in developed countries). With an increasing share of agricultural exports directed toward other developing countries, high levels of tariff protection in the South may impede prospects for export-led growth. This may be particularly true for the export opportunities of low-income countries, which have increased export market share in agriculture .
- "Open regionalism" holds the potential to stimulate global trade and improve the efficiency of regional producers. But regional arrangements can also become a vehicle for protection, trade diversion, and unintended inefficiency. Agreements in particular between richer and poorer developing countries risk generating trade losses for the poorer ones when their imports are diverted toward the richer members whose firms are not internationally competitive. However, where regional arrangements lead to the reduction of non-tariff barriers, trade creation is likely, and the dynamic benefits of effective regional integration in terms of improved governance and regional stability are likely to outweigh diversion concerns. The World Bank suggests that key conditions to benefit from expanded trade and investment include lowering common external trade barriers, stimulating competition, reducing transaction costs, and reinforcing nondiscriminatory investment and services policies. The greater structural differences between North and South economies mean that North-South arrangements hold the greatest promise for economic convergence and trade creation, including in agricultural products, underlining the importance of links between South-South arrangements and northern economies.
- Trade liberalization. According to the World Bank, “most analyses suggest that unilateral reduction in barriers can produce the greatest and the quickest gains.” Some countries, such as Chile, China and Costa Rica, have undertaken domestic policy reforms. Caution must however be employed: as the case of Haiti shows, liberalization when institutions and the economy are not strong enough to face risks and opportunities can be harmful (Rodrik 2001). And while reforms may be beneficial in the long run, for example by reducing possibilities for customs corruption, in the short run they create both winners and losers. Low-income consumers, unskilled workers in sheltered industries, and previously shielded producers may suffer in the transition period as the economy adapts to changed incentive structures. Temporary safety nets can help cushion the blow and ensure trade-led growth is pro-poor. Specific assistance to meet costs of adaptation – for example of switching to a different crop – may be appropriate.

== Market access is vital, but not enough ==
It is important to recognise that the issues facing LDCs and middle-income developing countries differ significantly. For the middle-income countries, the primary issue is market access. Many of the world’s poor live in these countries, and so market access alone can have significant poverty-reducing effects in these countries. However, for the least developed countries, the principal problem is not market access, but lack of production capacity to achieve new trading opportunities. This is recognised by paragraph 42 of the Doha Development Agenda:

We recognize that the integration of the LDCs into the multilateral trading system requires meaningful market access, support for the diversification of their production and export base, and trade-related technical assistance and capacity building.

So while the further development of middle-income countries, and in particular the tackling of rural poverty in these countries, can be achieved most importantly through increased market access in agriculture, lower-income countries need additional help, not only to take advantage of new opportunities, but to be able to adapt to changing conditions due to the loss of preferences. This additional help must take three main forms: support for developing-country agricultural production; support for participation in trade; and support for good policies and good governance.

=== Support for agricultural production ===
- Support for agricultural modernization and development – investment in productive capacity in agriculture and food processing.
- Support for agricultural-related development institutions which are not trade-distorting, e.g. research; e.g. risk-management of agricultural product price fluctuations; e.g. diversification.

=== Support for participation in trade and the global economy ===
Cases such as Haiti’s post-1986 liberalization show that the opportunities thereby created will not be taken advantage of if macroeconomic policies, institutions, and the investment climate are not favorable. This includes

- trade-related infrastructure: the cost of exporting must be low enough to ensure competitiveness in rapidly expanding high-value agricultural markets where competition is stiff – such as fruits and vegetables.
- It also includes related issues that are part of the general investment climate but can be particularly important for exports, such as a weak financial sector. Here, export finance “is often a major constraint inhibiting exports in many low-income countries.”
- Other issues are more specific to exports: developing countries and their exporters may have difficulty with both the implementation of, and showing compliance with, international product standards and other multilateral agreements. Low-income developing countries need both technical and financial assistance in this area.
- Technical Assistance for negotiations is also needed to further developing-country interests in multilateral and bilateral arenas and ensure the success of future negotiations and agreements.
- Marketing of exports is also a challenge for low-income countries: product and country brands need to be built, and quality concerns met.

Given the importance of agriculture for poverty reduction, additional policies and institutional capacity are needed to ensure an effective supply response to market incentives provide by better market access. Rural infrastructure is particularly important in enabling agricultural exports in developing countries. Sufficient credit at competitive conditions is important for private sector investment in storage, transportation and marketing of agricultural products. Investment in skills and education in rural areas is needed to bolster agricultural productivity. Trade policy reforms must address any remaining anti-export bias. Efficient land policies and land tenure institutions are needed to ensure the functioning of land markets, property rights, and efficient farm structures.

== World Trade Organization negotiations ==
The most recent round of World Trade Organization negotiations (the Doha "Development" Round) was promoted as being directed at the interests of developing countries, addressing issues of developed country protectionism. The introduction of the (investment-related) Singapore issues together with a lack of sufficient concessions to developing countries' interests has put the success of the negotiations in doubt.

== See also ==
- United Nations Conference on Trade and Development
- World Trade Organization
- Agricultural policy
- Common Agricultural Policy
- United States trade policy
