= Doha (disambiguation) =

Doha or Ad-Dawhah is the capital city of Qatar. It may also refer to:

== Places ==
- Doha (municipality), the municipality in Qatar that includes Doha city
- Doha, Iran, a village in Isfahan Province, Iran
- Doha, Kuwait, a town in Jahra Governorate, Kuwait
- al-Dawha, a city in the West Bank, Palestinian territories
- Downtown Hartford, the Downtown area of Hartford, Connecticut

== People ==
- Abu Doha, Algerian al Qaeda suspect who is alleged to have ties to various millennium bomb plots
- Doha Mekki, American attorney
- Doha Kang, South Korean manhwa artist

== Other ==
- Doha Stadium, a football stadium in Sakhnin, Israel
- Doha Sports City, Qatar
- Doha (Indian literature), a lyrical verse form
- Doha (poetry), a style of Apabhraṃśa and Hindi poetry
- Doha Declaration, an agreement adopted by the World Trade Organization Ministerial Conference of 2001 in Doha, Qatar concerning intellectual property rights to medicines
- Doha Development Round, a set of World Trade Organization talks that began in 2001 in Doha, Qatar
- Doha Amendment, a 2012 amendment to the Kyoto Protocol
- Agony of Doha, a term used to refer to Japan's qualification match for 1994 FIFA World Cup with Iraq, held in Doha in 1993

== See also ==
- Doha conference (disambiguation), for conferences and meetings held in Doha
- Dohar
- Dołha (pronounced "doha"), a village in Poland
