= Doha conference =

Doha conference can refer to several meetings held in Doha, Qatar:

- The WTO Ministerial Conference of 2001
  - leading to the Doha Development Round
  - and the Doha Declaration on the TRIPS Agreement and Public Health
- 2008 follow-up conference to the Monterrey Consensus
- Doha Agreement (2008) between rival Lebanese factions
- Hamas–Fatah Doha agreement (2012)
- 2012 United Nations Climate Change Conference
- Doha Declaration on Integrating Crime Prevention and Criminal Justice into the Wider United Nations Agenda, adopted at the 2015 United Nations Congress on Crime Prevention and Criminal Justice
- Doha Agreement (2020) between the United States and the Taliban
