= Modalities (trade negotiations) =

Modalities are the formulas, targets, or specific measures used to accomplish objectives in trade negotiations. An example of modalities in the current World Trade Organization agriculture negotiations would be a percentage phase-out over a specified time period of agricultural export subsidies or the use of the Swiss formula for tariff reduction and harmonization.

These modalities can cover a wide range of topics, including the format and structure of the negotiations, the schedule for meetings and deadlines, the roles and responsibilities of the various parties involved, and the rules for resolving disputes. The goal of establishing modalities in trade negotiations is to provide a clear framework for the discussions and help ensure that the negotiations proceed in an orderly and productive manner.
