= Swiss Formula =

Method to cut and harmonize tariff rates

The Swiss Formula is a mathematical formula designed to cut and harmonize tariff rates in international trade. Several countries are pushing for its use in World Trade Organization trade negotiations. It was first introduced by the Swiss Delegation to the WTO during the current round of trade negotiations at the WTO, the Doha Development Round or more simply the Doha Round. Something similar was used in the Tokyo Round.

The aim was to provide a mechanism where maximum tariffs could be agreed, and where existing low tariff countries would make a commitment to some further reduction.

== Details ==
The formula is of the form

$$T_\text{new}=\frac{A \times T_\text{old}}{A+T_\text{old}} = \frac 1 {\dfrac 1 {T_\text{old}} + \dfrac 1 A}$$

where

A is both the maximum tariff which is agreed to apply anywhere and a common coefficient to determine tariff reductions in each country;

T_{old} is the existing tariff rate for a particular country; and
T_{new} is the implied future tariff rate for that country.

So for example, a value A of 25% might be negotiated. If a very high tariff country has a rate T_{old} of 6000% then its T_{new} rate would be about 24.9%, almost the maximum of 25%. Somewhere with an existing tariff T_{old} of 64% would move to a T_{new} rate of about 18%, rather lower than the maximum; one with a rate T_{old} of 12% would move to a T_{new} rate of about 8.1%, substantially lower than the maximum. A very low tariff country with a rate T_{old} of 2.3% would move to a T_{new} rate of about 2.1%.

Mathematically, the Swiss formula has these characteristics:

1. As T_{old} tends to infinity, T_{new} tends to A, the agreed maximum tariff
2. As T_{old} tends to 0, T_{new} tends to T_{old} i.e. no change in tariffs as it is already low
3. When T_{old} is equal to A, the maximum, then T_{new} is half of A. Thus the maximum tariff which is agreed is cut in half.

== Criticisms ==
It has been argued however that the formula is too simple for use in tariff negotiations and that it does not lead to proportionate reduction in tariffs across all countries. It is because of this that those who believe an "ideal formula" exist are still looking for the ideal formula, with the Koreans having already suggested an alternative formula, though it has not yet been adopted nor is there any proof that an ideal formula exists.
