= World Trade Report =

- Official logo of WTO
- Author: World Trade Organization
- Country: Switzerland
- Language: English
- Website: https://www.wto.org/english/res_e/reser_e/wtr_e.htm

The World Trade Report (WTR) is the annual report published since 2003 by the World Trade Organization. Each WTR provides an in-depth analysis of an aspect of trends in international trade, trade policy issues and the multilateral trading system.

== 2016 Report ==
The 2016 World Trade Report examines the participation of Small and medium-sized enterprises (SMEs) in international trade, how the international trade landscape is changing for SMEs, and what the multilateral trading system does and can do to encourage more widespread and inclusive SME participation in global markets.

== 2023 Report ==
The 2023 report explores the role of international trade in addressing global challenges, including peace and security, poverty and inequality, and sustainable development. It emphasizes the significance of international trade, supported by a robust multilateral trading system, in establishing a secure, inclusive, and sustainable world.

Despite recent crises and trade tensions, global trade flows have demonstrated resilience. The report acknowledges the growing skepticism towards international trade, which has resulted in setbacks in regional trade integration efforts and the adoption of unilateral trade policies. WTO committees have witnessed an increase in trade concerns at the technical level, leading to trade tensions and a rise in government subsidies.

The report examines the impact of trade tensions on international trade flows. While the stagnation of the global trade-to-GDP ratio since the 2008 financial crisis is not primarily attributed to trade tensions, factors such as the deceleration of production unbundling have played a role. However, trade tensions between China and the United States are beginning to affect trade composition.

Furthermore, the report observes a gradual shift in trade along geopolitical lines, with trade between geopolitical blocs growing at a slower rate compared to trade within blocs. Despite these developments, claims of de-globalization are deemed exaggerated, as there are indications of re-globalization and increased international cooperation.

The report highlights the resilience of international trade during the COVID-19 pandemic and the Russian invasion of Ukraine. It emphasizes the importance of trade in facilitating the production and distribution of medical supplies and vaccines. The digital revolution has contributed to the growth of trade in digitally delivered services, while the value of global trade in environmental goods has risen rapidly. Global value chains have expanded to involve more economies, and trade policy has made significant progress through agreements such as the WTO Agreement on Trade Facilitation and the WTO Agreement on Fisheries Subsidies.

Overall, the World Trade Report 2023 underscores the ongoing relevance of international trade in addressing global challenges and advocates for an inclusive and sustainable approach to globalization. It explores how re-globalization, characterized by increased international cooperation, can effectively tackle the major challenges of national and economic security, poverty alleviation, and environmental sustainability. The report emphasizes the importance of global solutions through enhanced cooperation and highlights the role of a revitalized multilateral trading system overseen by the WTO.

== List of World Trade Reports ==
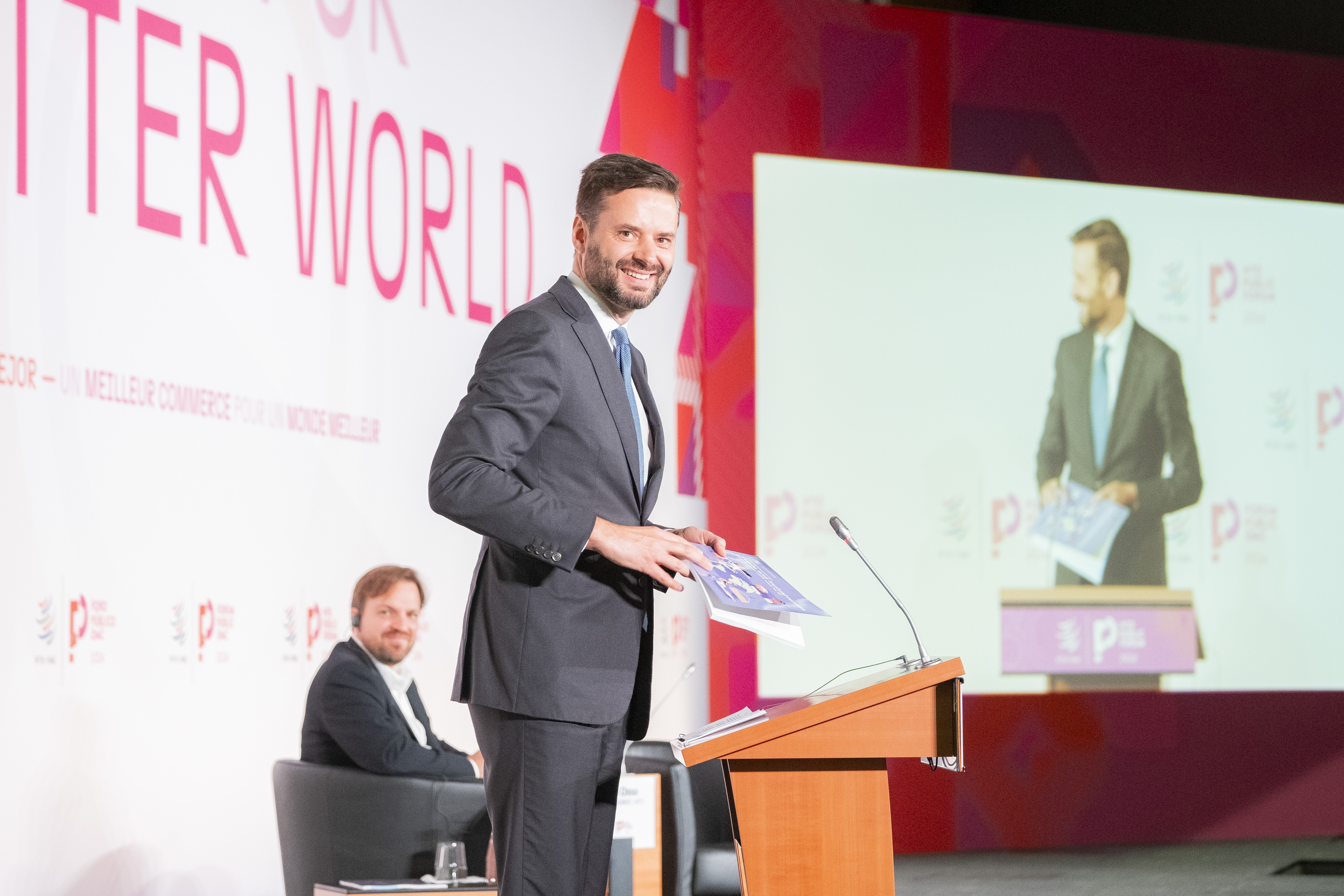

- 2003: Trade and development
- 2004: Coherence
- 2005: Trade, standards and the WTO
- 2006: Exploring the links between subsidies, trade and the WTO
- 2007: Sixty Years of the Multilateral Trading System : Achievements and Challenges
- 2008: Trade in a Globalizing World
- 2009: Trade Policy Commitments and Contingency Measures
- 2010: Trade in natural resources
- 2011: The WTO and preferential trade agreements: From co-existence to coherence
- 2012: Trade and public policies: A closer look at non-tariff measures in the 21st century
- 2013: Factors shaping the future of world trade
- 2014: Trade and development: recent trends and the role of the WTO
- 2015: Speeding up trade: benefits and challenges of implementing the WTO Trade Facilitation Agreement
- 2016: Levelling the trading field for SMEs
- 2017: Trade, technology and jobs
- 2018: The future of world trade - How digital technologies are transforming global commerce
- 2019: The future of services trade
- 2020: Government policies to promote innovation in the digital age
- 2021: Economic resilience and trade
- 2022: Climate change and international trade
- 2023: Re-globalization for a secure, inclusive and sustainable future
