= World Trade Organization =

Intergovernmental trade organization

- Organisation mondiale du commerce (French); Organización Mundial del Comercio (Spanish)

- Members Members, dually represented by the European Union (EU) Observers Non-participant states Not applicable
- Abbreviation: WTO
- Formation: 1 January 1995; 31 years ago
- Type: Intergovernmental organization
- Purpose: Reduction of tariffs and other barriers to trade
- Headquarters: Centre William Rappard, Geneva, Switzerland
- Coordinates: 46°13′27″N 06°08′58″E
- Region served: Worldwide
- Members: 166 members (162 UN member states, the European Union, Hong Kong, Macao, and Taiwan)
- Official languages: English, French, Spanish
- Director-General: Ngozi Okonjo-Iweala (since 2021)
- Budget: CHF 204,928,900 (2024)
- Staff: approx. 630 (as of 31 December 2024)
- Website: wto.org

The World Trade Organization (WTO) is an intergovernmental organization that regulates and facilitates international trade. Established on 1 January 1995, pursuant to the 1994 Marrakesh Agreement, it succeeded the General Agreement on Tariffs and Trade (GATT), which was created in 1948. As the world's largest international economic organization, the WTO has 166 members, representing over 98% of global trade and global GDP. It is headquartered in Geneva, Switzerland.

The WTO's primary functions are to provide a framework for negotiating trade agreements and to resolve trade disputes among its members. Its agreements, which are negotiated and signed by the majority of the world's trading nations and ratified in their legislatures, cover trade in goods, services, and intellectual property. The organization operates on the principle of non-discrimination—enshrined in the most-favoured-nation and national treatment provisions—but allows for exceptions for environmental protection, national security, and other objectives.

The WTO's highest decision-making body is the Ministerial Conference, which convenes biennially and makes decisions by consensus. Day-to-day business is managed by the General Council, composed of representatives from all member states. The organization is administered by a Secretariat led by the Director-General; since 2021, this position has been held by Ngozi Okonjo-Iweala of Nigeria. The WTO's annual budget is approximately 200 million CHF ($263 million USD), contributed by members based on their share of international trade.

Economic studies generally find that the WTO has boosted trade and reduced trade barriers. Criticisms of WTO include that the benefits of WTO-facilitated free trade are not shared equally, that its agreements may disadvantage developing countries, and that commercial interests have been prioritised over environmental and labour concerns. The organization has also been central to major trade disputes and stalled negotiations, such as the Doha Development Round and the paralysis of its Appellate Body, which have raised questions about its future efficacy.

== History ==
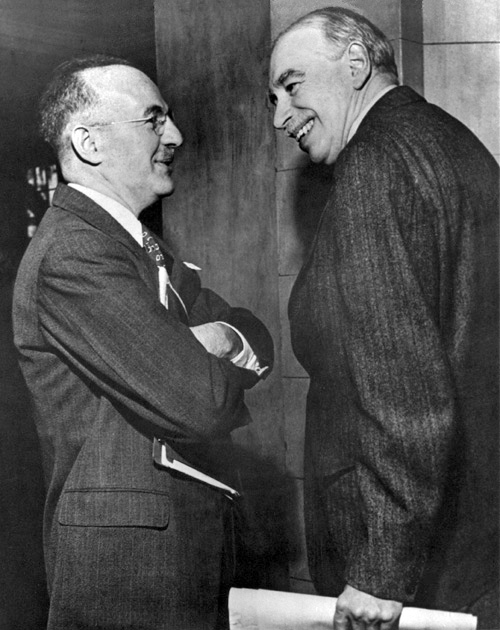
The economists Harry Dexter White (left) and John Maynard Keynes (right) at the Bretton Woods Conference in New Hampshire

The WTO precursor, General Agreement on Tariffs and Trade (GATT), was established by a multilateral treaty of 23 countries in 1947 after the end of World War II, in the wake of other new multilateral institutions dedicated to international economic cooperation—such as the World Bank (founded 1944) and the International Monetary Fund (founded 1944–1945). A comparable international institution for trade, named the International Trade Organization (ITO), never started, since the United States and other signatories did not ratify the establishment treaty, and so the GATT slowly became a de facto international organization.

=== GATT negotiations before Uruguay ===
Seven rounds of negotiations occurred under the General Agreement on Tariffs and Trade (1949 to 1979). The early GATT trade rounds concentrated on further reducing tariffs. Then the Kennedy Round in the mid-sixties brought about a GATT anti-dumping agreement and a section on development. The Tokyo Round during the seventies represented the first major attempt to tackle trade barriers that do not take the form of tariffs, and to improve the system, adopting a series of agreements on non-tariff barriers, which in some cases interpreted existing GATT rules, and in others broke entirely new ground. Because not all GATT members accepted these plurilateral agreements, they were often informally called "codes". (The Uruguay Round amended several of these codes and turned them into multilateral commitments accepted by all WTO members. Only four remained plurilateral (those on government procurement, bovine meat, civil aircraft, and dairy products), but in 1997 WTO members agreed to terminate the bovine meat and dairy agreements, leaving only two.) Despite attempts in the mid-1950s and 1960s to establish some form of institutional mechanism for international trade, the GATT continued to operate for almost half a century as a semi-institutionalized multilateral treaty régime on a provisional basis.

=== Uruguay Round: 1986–1994 ===
Well before GATT's 40th anniversary (due in 1987–1988), GATT members concluded that the GATT system was straining to adapt to a globalizing world economy. In response to problems identified in the 1982 Ministerial Declaration (structural deficiencies, spill-over impacts of certain countries' policies on world trade which GATT could not manage, etc.), a meeting in Punta del Este, Uruguay, launched the eighth GATT round—known as the "Uruguay Round"—in September 1986.

In the biggest negotiating mandate on trade ever agreed, the Uruguay Round talks aimed to extend the trading system into several new areas, notably trade in services and intellectual property, and to reform trade in the sensitive sectors of agriculture and textiles; all the original GATT articles were up for review. The Final Act concluding the Uruguay Round and officially establishing the WTO regime was signed on 15 April 1994, during the ministerial meeting at Marrakesh, Morocco—hence known as the Marrakesh Agreement.

The GATT still exists as the WTO's umbrella treaty for trade in goods, updated as a result of the Uruguay Round negotiations (a distinction is made between GATT 1994, the updated parts of GATT, and GATT 1947, the original agreement which is still the heart of GATT 1994). GATT 1994 is not, however, the only legally binding agreement included via the Final Act at Marrakesh; a long list of about 60 agreements, annexes, decisions, and understandings was adopted. The agreements fall into six main parts:

- the Agreement Establishing the WTO
- the Multilateral Agreements on Trade in Goods, including the GATT 1994 and the Trade Related Investment Measures (TRIMS)
- the General Agreement on Trade in Services (GATS)
- the Agreement on Trade-Related Aspects of Intellectual Property Rights (TRIPS)
- dispute settlement
- reviews of governments' trade policies

In terms of the WTO's principle relating to tariff "ceiling-binding" (No. 3), the Uruguay Round has been successful in increasing binding commitments by both developed and developing countries, as may be seen in the percentages of tariffs bound before and after the 1986–1994 talks.

=== Ministerial conferences ===
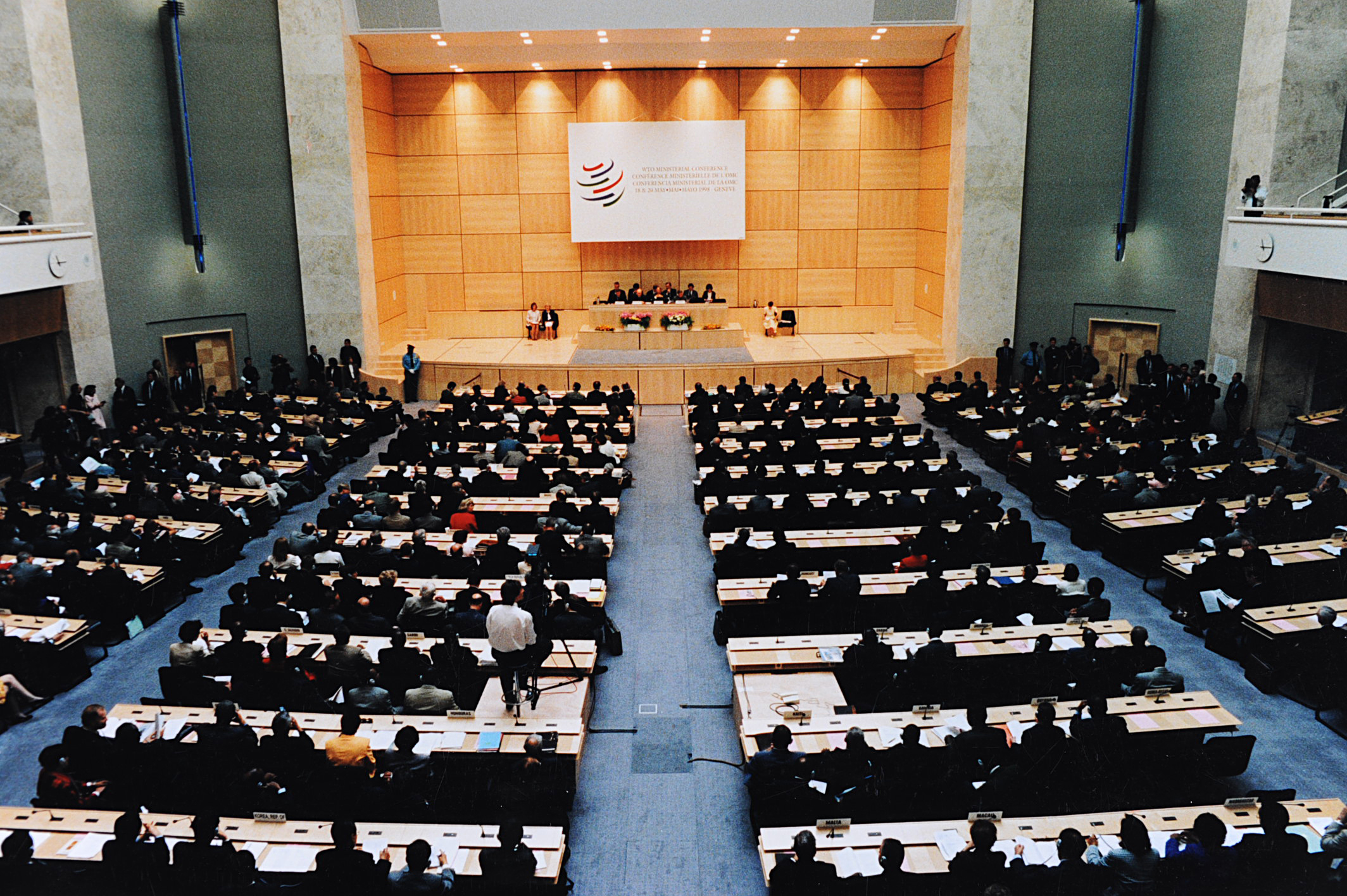
The World Trade Organization Ministerial Conference of 1998, in the Palace of Nations (Geneva, Switzerland)

The highest decision-making body of the WTO, the Ministerial Conference, usually meets every two years. It brings together all members of the WTO, all of which are countries or customs unions. The Ministerial Conference can take decisions on all matters under any of the multilateral trade agreements. Some meetings, such as the inaugural ministerial conference in Singapore (1996) and the inaugural ministerial conference in Cancún, Mexico (2003) involved arguments between developed nations and low-income and lower-middle income countries, referred to as the "Singapore issues", such as agricultural subsidies; while others such as the Seattle conference in 1999 provoked large demonstrations. The fourth ministerial conference in Doha, Qatar in 2001 approved China's entry to the WTO and launched the Doha Development Round which was supplemented by the sixth WTO ministerial conference in Hong Kong, which agreed to phase out agricultural export subsidies and to adopt the European Union's Everything but Arms initiative to phase out tariffs for goods from the least developed countries. At the sixth WTO Ministerial Conference of 2005 in December, WTO launched the Aid for Trade initiative and it is specifically to assist developing countries in trade as included in the Sustainable Development Goal 8 which is to increase aid for trade support and economic growth.

The Twelfth Ministerial Conference (MC12) was due to be held in Nur-Sultan, Kazakhstan, in June 2020, but was canceled because of the COVID-19 pandemic. It was later held in Geneva, Switzerland from 12–17 June 2022. The Thirteenth Ministerial Conference (MC13) was held in Abu Dhabi, UAE on 26–29 February 2024, and extended to Friday 1 March 2024 to complete deliberations.

The 14th Ministerial Conference (MC14) took place from 26 to 30 March 2026 in Yaoundé, Cameroon. Actually, after a lengthy but eventually fruitless preparatory process, outcome expectations were rather limited, especially for the oldest and most difficult issues. Only three decisions were adopted and transmitted for finalisation to the General Council in Geneva. It came as no surprise that, as in earlier conferences, no formal Ministerial Declaration was adopted after four lengthy days without formal negotiations. Chairperson Luc Magloire Atangana Mbarga (Cameroon) had to conclude the conference with a personal summary. The three decisions were endorsed by the ministers. The Chairman and the Director General distributed a couple of texts for further treatment in Geneva.

On 26 June 2026, the General Council adopted guidelines for the next stages towards a substantive reform and appointed five ambassadors as facilitators for fundamental issues (Malaysia), consensus-based decision-making (Japan), development (Botswana), level playing field, subsidy rules and unfair competition (Peru), and new issues (Kazakhstan).

=== Doha Round (Doha Agenda): 2001–present ===
The WTO launched the current round of negotiations, the Doha Development Round, at the fourth ministerial conference in Doha, Qatar in November 2001. This was to be an ambitious effort to make globalization more inclusive and help the world's poor, particularly by slashing barriers and subsidies in farming. The initial agenda comprised both further trade liberalization and new rule-making, underpinned by commitments to strengthen substantial assistance to developing countries.

Progress stalled over differences between developed nations and the major low-income and lower-middle income countries on issues such as industrial tariffs and non-tariff barriers to trade particularly against and between the EU and the US over their maintenance of agricultural subsidies—seen to operate effectively as trade barriers. Repeated attempts to revive the talks proved unsuccessful, though the adoption of the Bali Ministerial Declaration in 2013 addressed bureaucratic barriers to commerce.

As of June 2012, the future of the Doha Round remained uncertain: the work programme lists 21 subjects in which the original deadline of 1 January 2005 was missed, and the round remains incomplete. The conflict between free trade in industrial goods and services but retention of protectionism on farm subsidies to domestic agricultural sectors (requested by developed countries) and the substantiation of fair trade on agricultural products (requested by developing countries) remain the major obstacles. This impasse has made it impossible to launch new WTO negotiations beyond the Doha Development Round. As a result, there have been an increasing number of bilateral free trade agreements between governments. As of July 2012 there were various negotiation groups in the WTO system for the current stalemated agricultural trade negotiation.

== Functions ==
The WTO has several functions:

- Overseeing the implementation, administration and operation of the covered agreements (with the exception that it does not enforce any agreements when China came into the WTO in December 2001)
- Providing a forum for negotiations and for settling disputes.
- Reviewing and documenting national trade policies.
- Assisting developing, least-developed and low-income countries in transition to adjust to WTO rules and disciplines through technical cooperation and training.
- Cooperating, as appropriate, with the International Monetary Fund (IMF) and with the International Bank for Reconstruction and Development (IBRD) and its affiliated agencies to coordinate global economic policies.

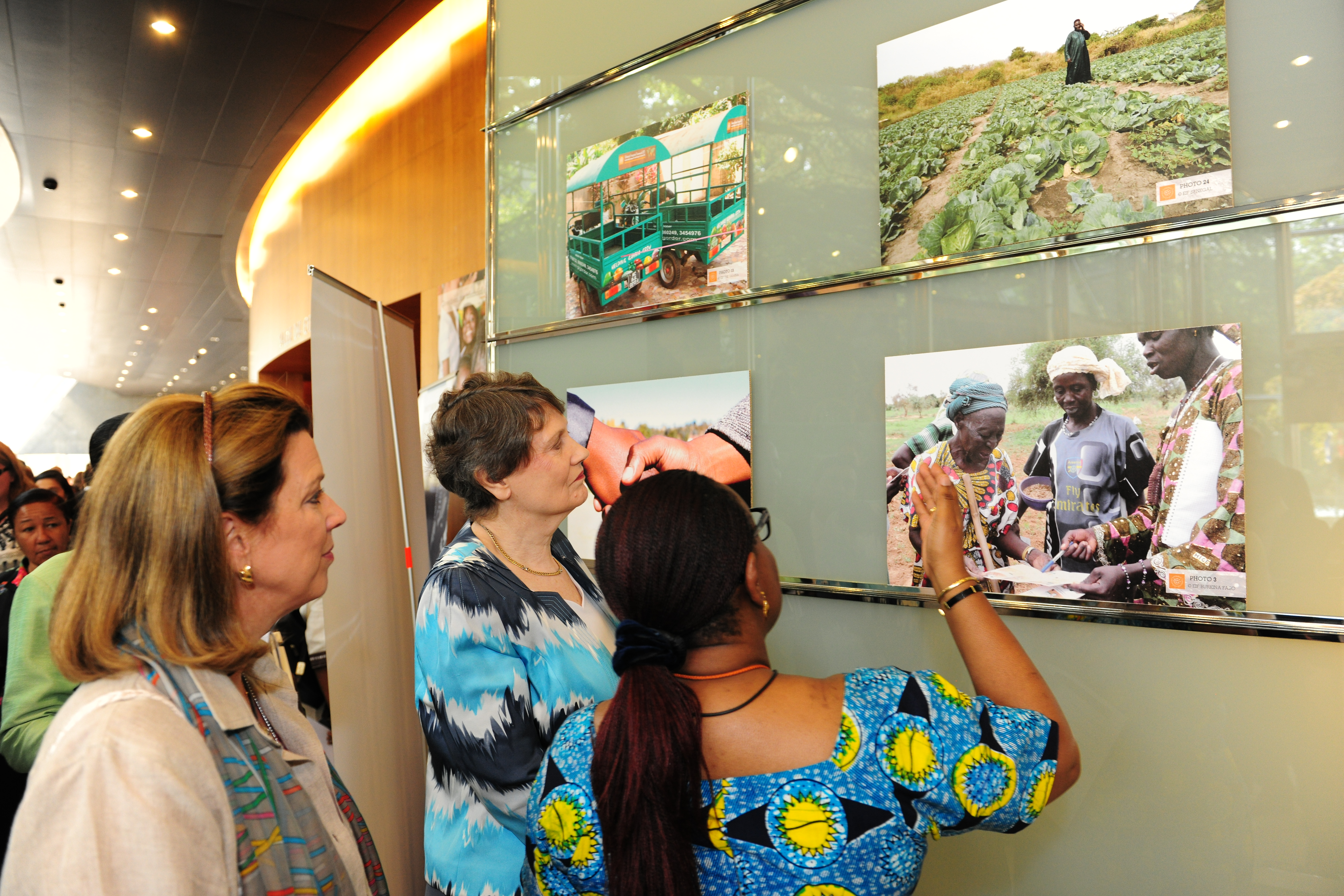
Aid for Trade is one way the organization functions to help countries that are developing economically.

=== Differences between GATT and WTO ===
Decisions in GATT were, in practice, made through consensus, and member states were allowed numerous exceptions for not complying with GATT rules if GATT conflicted with legitimate domestic objectives. Many of the GATT's rules were ambiguous and flexible. GATT members could also block a dispute settlement if it was unlikely to lead to a mutually acceptable ruling. These organizational design decisions reflected a wariness among member states to delegate too much power to the international organization and fears that GATT would not allow member states to respond to domestic political pressures. Cooperation in GATT tended to be the outcome of shared norms, rather than explicit rules and threats of punishment.

WTO was created in order to accommodate more issue areas (such as services and intellectual property) and a vastly enlarged membership. In comparison to GATT, the WTO included vastly more numerous and more precise obligations on member states. Member states that were non-compliant were subject to punishment or to dispute settlements that could produce adverse outcomes. The consensus-based nature of rule changes has contributed to deadlock in the WTO and discontent among member states, as they are unable to resolve problems.

=== Key publications ===
The WTO is recognized for producing authoritative annual reports that provide clarity on the complexities of global trade, such as:

- World Trade Report, which explores current trade trends and policy challenges.
- WTO Annual Report, which compiles a complete overview of the organization's activities and operations.
- World Trade Statistical Review, which compiles annual trade data.

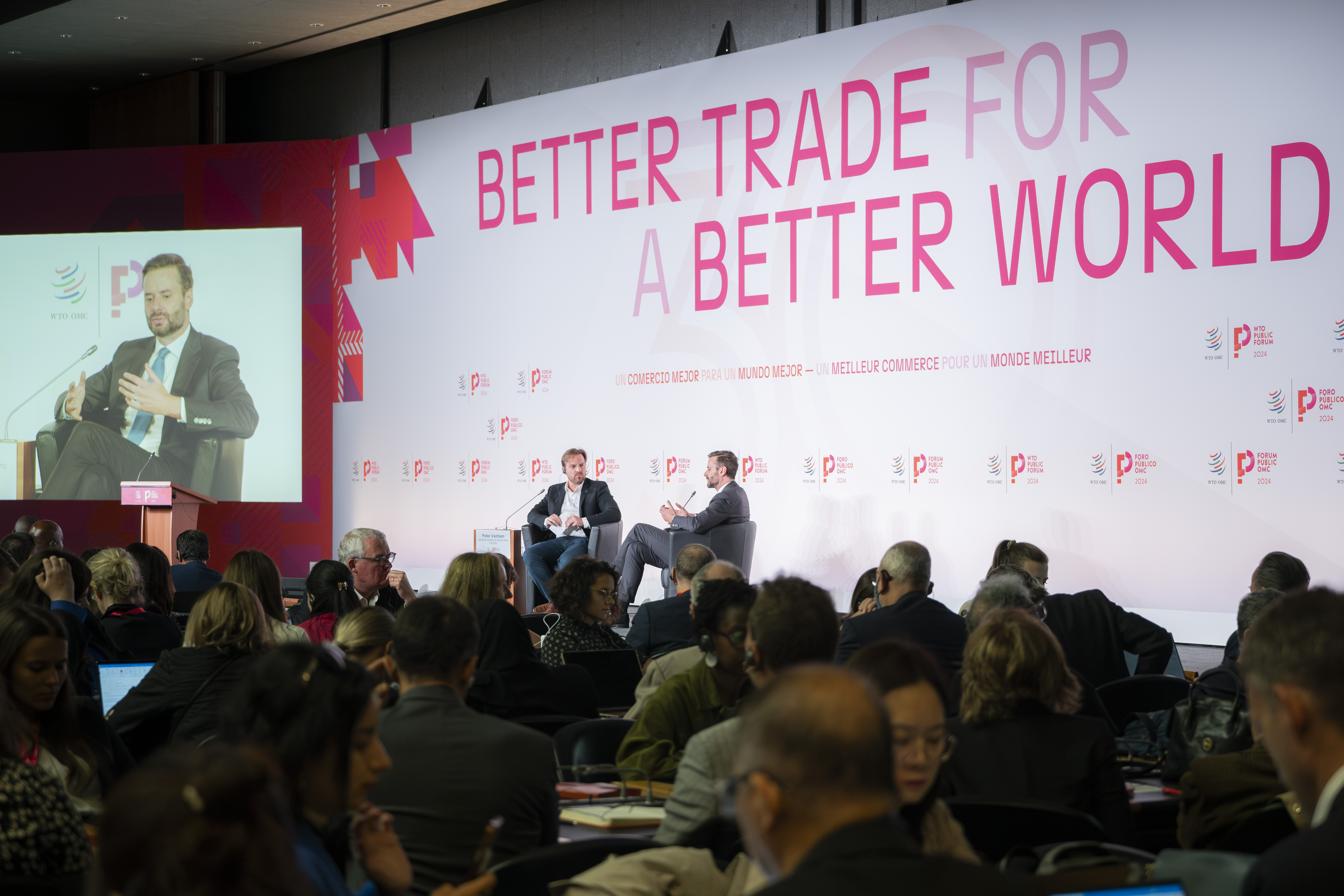
Public forum where the recently published World Trade Report was discussed.

== Principles of the trading system ==
The WTO establishes a framework for trade policies; it does not define or specify outcomes. That is, it is concerned with setting the rules of "trade policy". Five principles are of particular importance in understanding both the pre-1994 GATT and the WTO:

1. Non-discrimination. It has two major components: the most favored nation (MFN) treatment and the national treatment. Both are embedded in the main WTO agreements on goods, services, and intellectual property, but their precise scope and nature differ across these areas. The MFN rule requires that a WTO member must apply the same conditions on all trade with other WTO members, i.e., a WTO member has to grant the most favorable conditions under which it allows trade in a certain product type to all other WTO members. "Grant someone a special favor and you have to do the same for all other WTO members." Some exceptions exist, such as when states participate in a free trade agreement or for preferential treatment given to developing countries. National treatment means that imported goods should be treated no less favorably than domestically produced goods (at least after the foreign goods have entered the market) and was introduced to tackle non-tariff barriers to trade (e.g. technical standards, security standards et al. discriminating against imported goods).
2. Reciprocity. It reflects both a desire to limit the scope of free-riding that may arise because of the MFN rule and a desire to obtain better access to foreign markets. A related point is that for a nation to negotiate, it is necessary that the gain from doing so be greater than the gain available from unilateral liberalization; reciprocal concessions intend to ensure that such gains will materialize.
3. Binding and enforceable commitments. The tariff commitments made by WTO members in multilateral trade negotiations and on accession are enumerated in a legal instrument known as a schedule (list) of concessions. These schedules establish "ceiling bindings": a country can change its bindings, but only after negotiating with its trading partners, which could mean compensating them for loss of trade. If satisfaction is not obtained, the complaining country may invoke the WTO dispute settlement procedures.
4. Transparency. The WTO members are required to publish their trade regulations, to maintain institutions allowing for the review of administrative decisions affecting trade, to respond to requests for information by other members, and to notify changes in trade policies to the WTO. These internal transparency requirements are supplemented and facilitated by periodic country-specific reports (trade policy reviews) through the Trade Policy Review Mechanism (TPRM). The WTO system also tries to improve predictability and stability, discouraging the use of quotas and other measures used to set limits on quantities of imports.
5. Safety valves. In specific circumstances, governments are able to restrict trade. The WTO's agreements permit members to take measures to protect not only the environment but also public health, animal health and plant health.

There are three types of provision in this direction:

1. Articles allowing for the use of trade measures to attain non-economic objectives.
2. Articles aimed at ensuring "fair competition"; members must not use environmental protection measures as a means of disguising protectionist policies.
3. Provisions permitting intervention in trade for economic reasons.

Exceptions to the MFN principle also allow for preferential treatment of developing countries, regional free trade areas and customs unions.

== Organizational structure ==
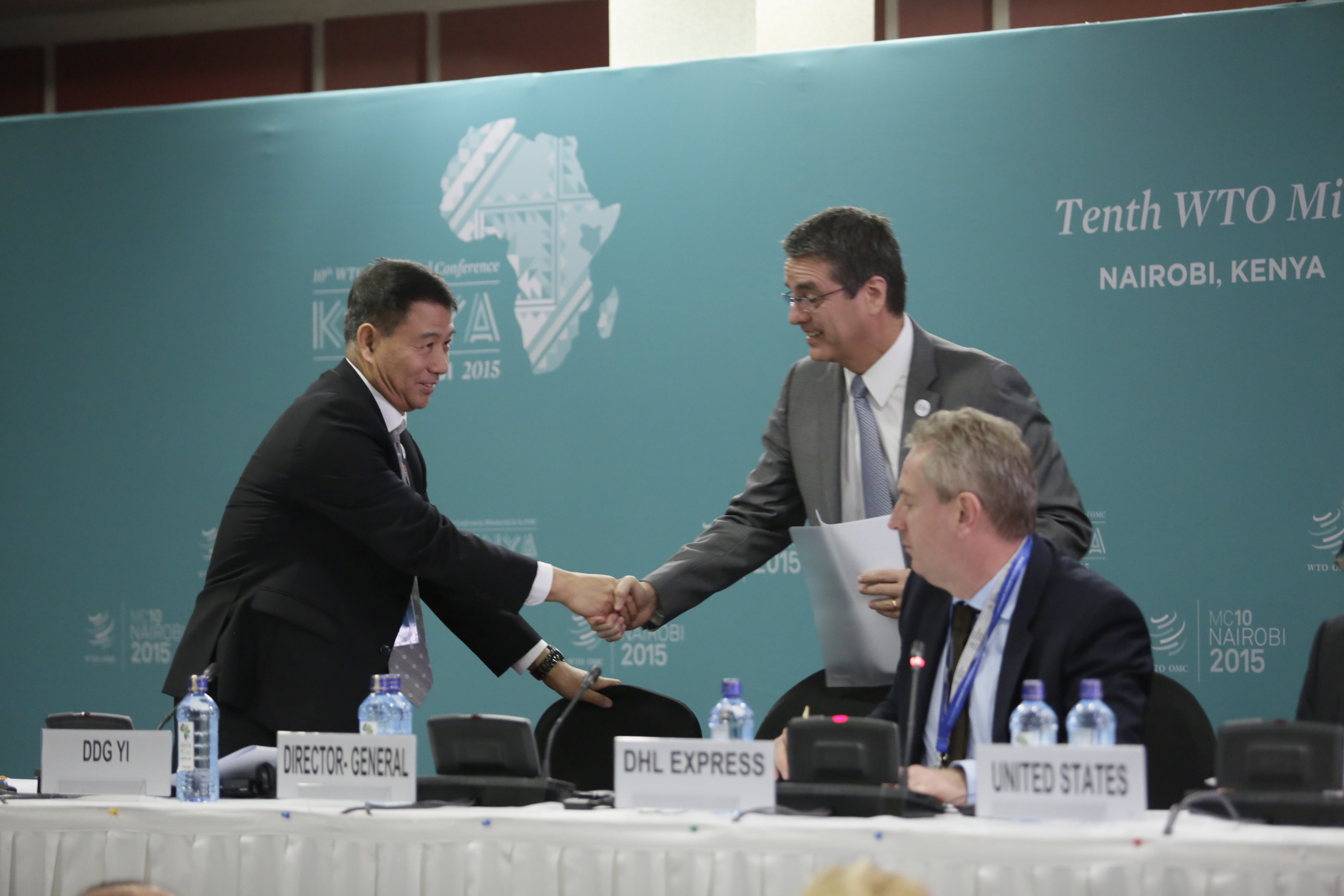
The biennial Ministerial Conference, which is the highest authority of the WTO, brings people together to discuss ideas and concerns, which can lead to new policies or agreements.

The highest authority of the WTO is the Ministerial Conference, which must meet at least every two years. The Ministerial Conference met most recently in March 2026 in Yaoundé.

In between each Ministerial Conference, the daily work is handled by three bodies whose membership is the same; they only differ by the terms of reference under which each body is constituted:

- The General Council
- The Dispute Settlement Body
- The Trade Policy Review Body

The General Council, whose Chair as of 2026 is Clare Kelly of New Zealand, has the following subsidiary bodies which oversee committees in different areas:

- Council for Trade in Goods.
- Council for Trade-Related Aspects of Intellectual Property Rights.
- Council for Trade in Services.
- Trade Negotiations Committee.

The Service Council has three subsidiary bodies: financial services, domestic regulations, GATS rules, and specific commitments. The council has several different committees, working groups, and working parties. There are committees on the following: Trade and Environment; Trade and Development (Subcommittee on Least-Developed Countries); Regional Trade Agreements; Balance of Payments Restrictions; and Budget, Finance and Administration. There are working parties on the following: Accession. There are working groups on the following: Trade, debt and finance; and Trade and technology transfer.

While the WTO and the UN have strong relations, they are two legally independent intergovernmental organizations.

As of 31 December 2022, the number of WTO staff on a regular budget is 340 women and 283 men.

== Decision-making ==
The WTO describes itself as "a rules-based, member-driven organization—all decisions are made by the member governments, and the rules are the outcome of negotiations among members". The WTO Agreement foresees votes where consensus cannot be reached, but the practice of consensus dominates the process of decision-making.

Richard Harold Steinberg (2002) argues that although the WTO's consensus governance model provides law-based initial bargaining, trading rounds close through power-based bargaining favoring Europe and the U.S., and may not lead to Pareto improvement.

== Dispute settlement ==
The WTO's dispute-settlement system "is the result of the evolution of rules, procedures and practices developed over almost half a century under the GATT 1947". In 1994, the WTO members agreed on the Understanding on Rules and Procedures Governing the Settlement of Disputes (DSU) annexed to the "Final Act" signed in Marrakesh in 1994. Dispute settlement is regarded by the WTO as the central pillar of the multilateral trading system, and as a "unique contribution to the stability of the global economy". WTO members have agreed that, if they believe fellow-members are violating trade rules, they will use the multilateral system of settling disputes instead of taking action unilaterally.

The operation of the WTO dispute settlement process involves case-specific panels appointed by the Dispute Settlement Body (DSB), the Appellate Body, the Director-General and the WTO Secretariat, arbitrators, and advisory experts.

The priority is to settle disputes, preferably through a mutually agreed solution, and provision has been made for the process to be conducted in an efficient and timely manner so that "If a case is adjudicated, it should normally take no more than one year for a panel ruling and no more than 16 months if the case is appealed... If the complainant deems the case urgent, consideration of the case should take even less time." WTO member nations are obliged to accept the process as exclusive and compulsory.

According to a 2018 study in the Journal of Politics, states are less likely and slower to enforce WTO violations when the violations affect states in a diffuse manner. This is because states face collective action problems with pursuing litigation: they all expect other states to carry the costs of litigation. A 2016 study in International Studies Quarterly challenges that the WTO dispute settlement system leads to greater increases in trade.

However, the dispute settlement system cannot be used to resolve trade disputes that arise from political disagreements. When Qatar requested the establishment of a dispute panel concerning measures imposed by the UAE, other GCC countries and the US were quick to dismiss its request as a political matter, stating that national security issues were political and not appropriate for the WTO dispute system.

Since 2019, when the Donald Trump administration blocked appointments to the body, the Appellate Body has been unable to enforce WTO rules and punish violators of WTO rules. In March 2020, the European Union and 15 other WTO members agreed to a Multiparty Interim Appeal Arbitration Arrangement (MPIA). This gave access to an alternative appellate mechanism (arbitration as an appellate mechanism) while the Appellate Body is not functional.

== Accession and membership ==
The process of becoming a WTO member is unique to each applicant country, and the terms of accession are dependent upon the country's stage of economic development and the current trade regime. The process takes about five years, on average, but it can last longer if the country is less than fully committed to the process or if political issues interfere. The shortest accession negotiation was that of the Kyrgyz Republic, while the longest was that of Russia, which, having first applied to join GATT in 1993, was approved for membership in December 2011 and became a WTO member on 22 August 2012. Kazakhstan also had a long accession negotiation process. The Working Party on the Accession of Kazakhstan was established in 1996 and was approved for membership in 2015. The second longest was that of Vanuatu, whose Working Party on the Accession of Vanuatu was established on 11 July 1995. After a final meeting of the Working Party in October 2001, Vanuatu requested more time to consider its accession terms. In 2008, it indicated its interest to resume and conclude its WTO accession. The Working Party on the Accession of Vanuatu was reconvened informally on 4 April 2011 to discuss Vanuatu's future WTO membership. The re-convened Working Party completed its mandate on 2 May 2011. The General Council formally approved the Accession Package of Vanuatu on 26 October 2011. On 24 August 2012, the WTO welcomed Vanuatu as its 157th member. An offer of accession is only given once consensus is reached among interested parties.

A 2017 study argues that "political ties rather than issue-area functional gains determine who joins" and shows "how geopolitical alignment shapes the demand and supply sides of membership". The "findings challenge the view that states first liberalize trade to join the GATT/WTO. Instead, democracy and foreign policy similarity encourage states to join."

=== Accession process ===
WTO accession progress: Draft Working Party Report or Factual Summary adopted Goods or Services offers submitted Working party meetings Memorandum on Foreign Trade Regime submitted Working party established

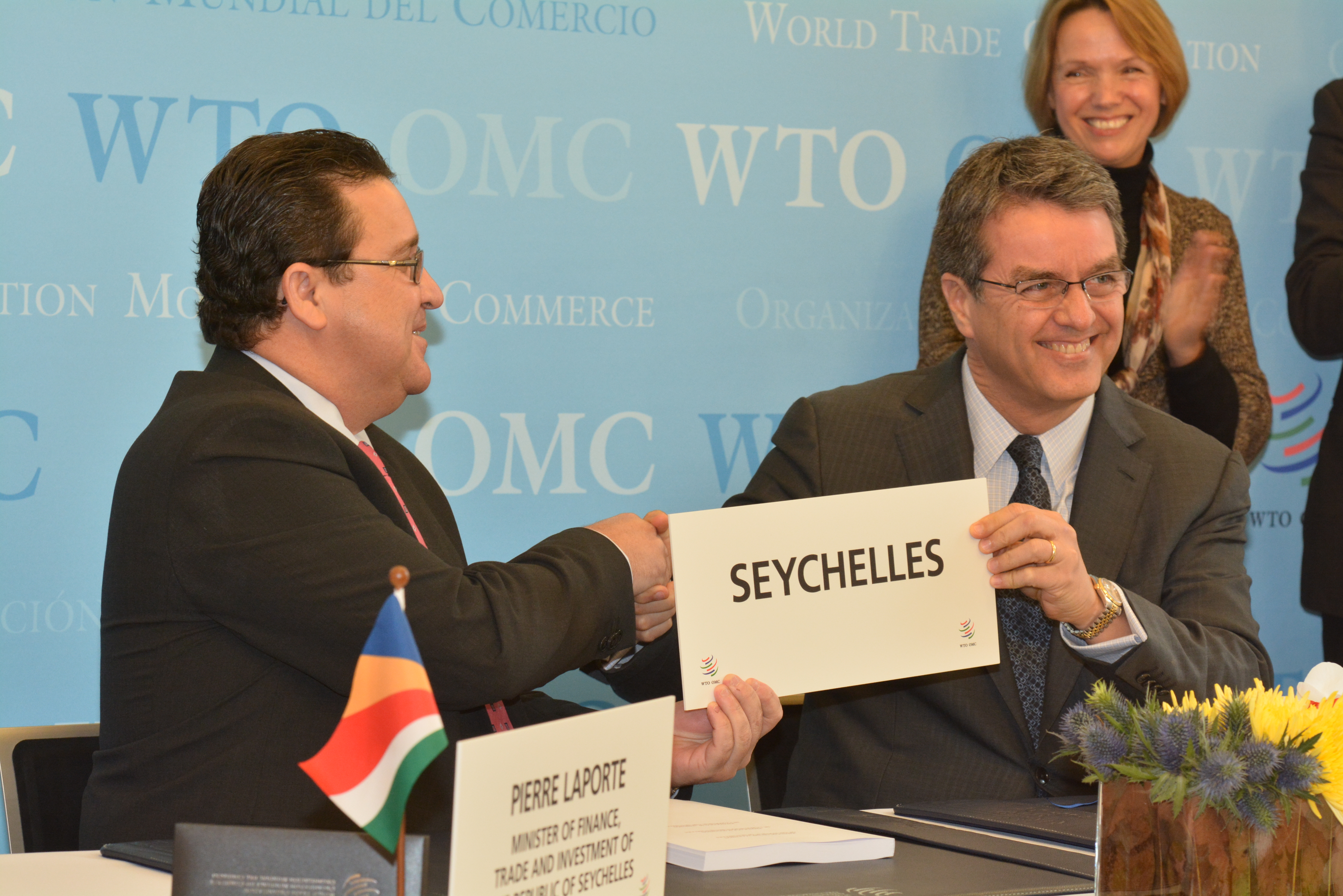
The accession process can take several years before a country becomes an official member of the organization.

A country wishing to accede to the WTO submits an application to the General Council, and has to describe all aspects of its trade and economic policies that have a bearing on WTO agreements. The application is submitted to the WTO in a memorandum which is examined by a working party open to all interested WTO Members.

After all necessary background information has been acquired, the working party focuses on issues of discrepancy between the WTO rules and the applicant's international and domestic trade policies and laws. The working party determines the terms and conditions of entry into the WTO for the applicant nation and may consider transitional periods to allow countries some leeway in complying with the WTO rules.

The final phase of accession involves bilateral negotiations between the applicant nation and other working party members regarding the concessions and commitments on tariff levels and market access for goods and services. The new member's commitments are to apply equally to all WTO members under normal non-discrimination rules, even though they are negotiated bilaterally. For instance, as a result of joining the WTO, Armenia offered a 15 per cent ceiling bound tariff rate on accessing its market for goods. Together with the tariff bindings being ad valorem there are no specific or compound rates. Moreover, there are no tariff-rate quotas on both industrial and agricultural products. Armenia's economic and trade performance growth was noted since its first review in 2010, especially its revival from the 2008 financial crisis, with an average annual 4% GDP growth rate, despite some fluctuations. Armenia's economy was marked by low inflation, diminishing poverty, and essential progress in enhancing its macroeconomic steadiness in which trade in goods and services, which is the equivalent of 87% of GDP, played a growing role.

When the bilateral talks conclude, the working party sends to the general council or ministerial conference an accession package, which includes a summary of all the working party meetings, the Protocol of Accession (a draft membership treaty), and lists ("schedules") of the member to be commitments. Once the general council or ministerial conference approves of the terms of accession, the applicant's parliament must ratify the Protocol of Accession before it can become a member. Some countries may have faced tougher and a much longer accession process due to challenges during negotiations with other WTO members, such as Vietnam, whose negotiations took more than 11 years before it became an official member in January 2007.

=== Members and observers ===
The WTO has 166 members and 23 observer governments. Most recently, on 26 February 2024 at the 13th Ministerial Conference in Abu Dhabi, Comoros and Timor Leste were approved to become the 165th and 166th members. In addition to states, the European Union, and each EU country in its own right, is a member. WTO members do not have to be fully independent states; they need only be a customs territory with full autonomy in the conduct of their external commercial relations. Thus Hong Kong has been a member since 1995 (as "Hong Kong, China" since 1997) predating the People's Republic of China, which joined in 2001 after 15 years of negotiations. Taiwan acceded to the WTO in 2002 as the "Separate Customs Territory of Taiwan, Penghu, Kinmen and Matsu." The WTO Secretariat omits the official titles (such as Counsellor, First Secretary, Second Secretary and Third Secretary) of the members of Taiwan's Permanent Mission to the WTO, except for the titles of the Permanent Representative and the Deputy Permanent Representative.

As of 2007, WTO members represented 96.4% of global trade and 96.7% of global GDP. Iran, followed by Iraq and Algeria, are the economies with the largest GDP and trade outside the WTO, using 2005 data. With the exception of the Holy See, observers must start accession negotiations within five years of becoming observers. A number of international intergovernmental organizations have also been granted observer status to WTO bodies. Ten UN members have no affiliation with the WTO.

== Agreements ==
The WTO oversees about 60 different agreements which have the status of international legal texts. Member countries must sign and ratify all WTO agreements on accession. A discussion of some of the most important agreements follows.

The Agreement on Agriculture came into effect with the establishment of the WTO at the beginning of 1995. The AoA has three central concepts, or "pillars": domestic support, market access and export subsidies.

The General Agreement on Trade in Services was created to extend the multilateral trading system to service sector, in the same way as the General Agreement on Tariffs and Trade (GATT) provided such a system for merchandise trade. The agreement entered into force in January 1995.

The Agreement on Trade-Related Aspects of Intellectual Property Rights sets down minimum standards for many forms of intellectual property (IP) regulation. It was negotiated at the end of the Uruguay Round of the General Agreement on Tariffs and Trade (GATT) in 1994.

The Agreement on the Application of Sanitary and Phytosanitary Measures—also known as the SPS Agreement—was negotiated during the Uruguay Round of GATT, and entered into force with the establishment of the WTO at the beginning of 1995. Under the SPS agreement, the WTO sets constraints on members' policies relating to food safety (bacterial contaminants, pesticides, inspection, and labeling) as well as animal and plant health (imported pests and diseases).

The Agreement on Technical Barriers to Trade is an international treaty of the World Trade Organization. It was negotiated during the Uruguay Round of the General Agreement on Tariffs and Trade and entered into force with the establishment of the WTO at the end of 1994. The agreement "seeke to ensure that technical negotiations and standards, as well as testing and certification procedures, do not create unnecessary obstacles to trade".

The Agreement on Customs Valuation, formally known as the Agreement on Implementation of Article VII of GATT, prescribes methods of customs valuation that Members are to follow. Chiefly, it adopts the "transaction value" approach.

In December 2013, the biggest agreement within the WTO was signed and known as the Bali Package.

== Office of director-general ==
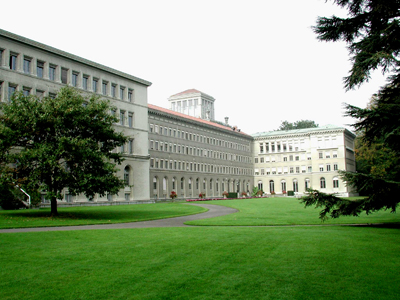
The headquarters of the World Trade Organization in Geneva, Switzerland

The procedures for the appointment of the WTO director-general were updated in January 2003, and include quadrennial terms. Additionally, there are four deputy directors-general. As of 18 June 2026 under director-general Ngozi Okonjo-Iweala, the four deputy directors-general are:

- Jennifer Nordquist of the United States
- Johanna Hill of El Salvador
- Jean-Marie Paugam of France
- Xiangchen Zhang of China

=== List of directors-general ===
Source: Official website

Portrait	Name	Country	Term
	Peter Sutherland	(Republic of Ireland) Ireland	1995
	Renato Ruggiero	Italy	1995–1999
	Mike Moore	New Zealand	1999–2002
	Supachai Panitchpakdi	Thailand	2002–2005
	Pascal Lamy	France	2005–2013
	Roberto Azevêdo	Brazil	2013–2021
	Ngozi Okonjo-Iweala	Nigeria	2021–

== Budget ==
The WTO derives most of the income for its annual budget from contributions by its Members. These are established according to a formula based on their share of international trade.

2025 Top 10 Members' contributions to the consolidated budget of the WTO
Rank	Country	CHF	Percentage
1	United States	23,092,470	11.37%
2	China	23,011,230	11.33%
3	Germany	14,314,488	7.05%
4	United Kingdom	7,352,220	3.62%
5	France	7,333,941	3.61%
6	Japan	7,240,515	3.57%
7	Netherlands	6,032,070	2.97%
8	South Korea	5,483,700	2.70%
9	Hong Kong	5,343,561	2.63%
10	Singapore	5,323,251	2.62%
Others		98,572,554	48.53%
TOTAL		203,100,000	100%

Each of the 27 European Union member states makes its contribution individually. Together, they account for 31.04% of the 2025 consolidated budget.

== Impact ==
Studies show that the WTO boosted trade. Research shows that in the absence of the WTO, the average country would face an increase in tariffs on their exports by 32 percentage points. The dispute settlement mechanism in the WTO is one way in which trade is increased. A 2023 study suggests that WTO membership has not enhanced trade for the Commonwealth of Independent States (CIS) countries. A 2026 study found that WTO membership contributes to a formalization of the economy and reduction in the informal economy.

According to a 2017 study in the Journal of International Economic Law, "nearly all recent preferential trade agreements (PTAs) reference the WTO explicitly, often dozens of times across multiple chapters. Likewise, in many of these same PTAs we find that substantial portions of treaty language—sometime the majority of a chapter—is copied verbatim from a WTO agreement... the presence of the WTO in PTAs has increased over time."

While the WTO has been blamed for the economic and social effects of globalization, Bernhofen estimated that containerization raised bilateral trade between industrialized countries by approximately 790% over the twenty years following adoption, compared with roughly 285% for joint GATT membership and 45% for other free trade agreements. The Economist wrote that the container had been "more of a driver of globalisation than all trade agreements in the past 50 years taken together." A 2021 report found that rising productivity, rather than trade, accounted for nearly all of the decline in U.S. manufacturing employment, citing an 85 percent reduction in the labor required to produce a ton of steel.

== Criticism ==
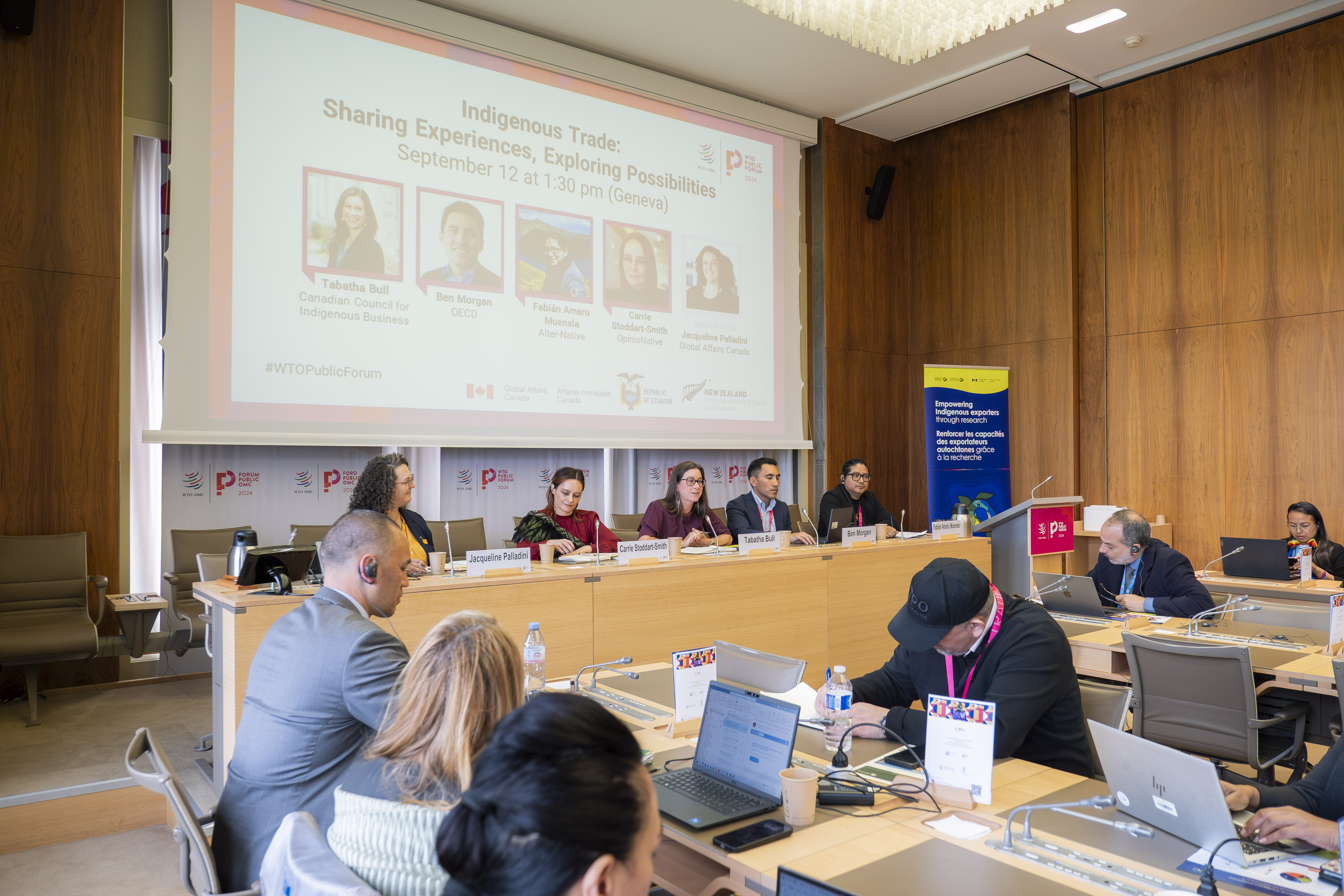
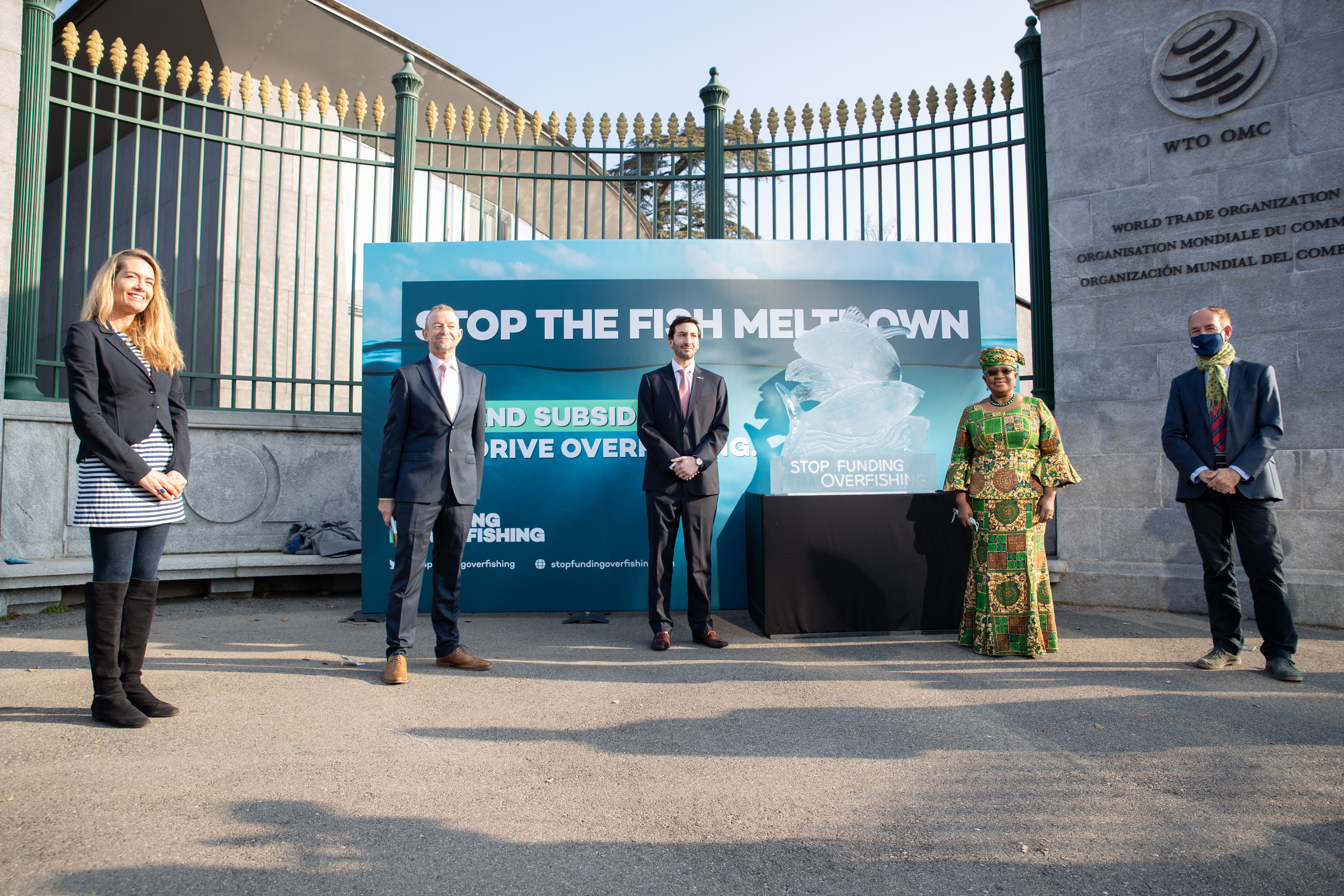
Whether in conference sessions or through public engagements, discussion of difficult topics can lead to more awareness and possible solutions for all stakeholders.

Although tariffs and other trade barriers have been significantly reduced thanks to GATT and WTO, the promise that free trade will accelerate economic growth, reduce poverty, and increase people's incomes has been questioned by many critics.

Economist Ha-Joon Chang argues that there is a "paradox" in neo-liberal beliefs regarding free trade because the economic growth of developing countries was higher in the 1960–1980 period compared to the 1980–2000 period even though its trade policies are now far more liberal than before. Also, there are results of research that show that new countries actively reduce trade barriers only after becoming significantly rich. From the results of the study, WTO critics argue that trade liberalization does not guarantee economic growth and certainly not poverty alleviation. He also cites the example of El Salvador; in the early 1990s, El Salvador removed all quantitative barriers to imports and also cut tariffs. However, the country's economic growth remained weak. On the other hand, Vietnam, which only began reforming its economy in the late 1980s, saw a great deal of success by deciding to follow China's economic model and liberalizing slowly along with implementing safeguards for domestic commerce. Vietnam has largely succeeded in accelerating economic growth and reducing poverty without immediately removing substantial trade barriers. On 24 September 2025, China announced that it will no longer request so-called Special and Differential Treatment (SDT) benefits, which arise from its developing country status, in WTO negotiations on future deals.

Critics also put forward the view that the benefits derived from WTO facilitated free trade are not shared equally. This criticism is usually supported by historical accounts of the outcomes of negotiations and/or data showing that the gap between the rich and the poor continues to widen, especially in China and India, where economic inequality was growing at the time even though economic growth is very high. In addition, WTO approaches aiming to reduce trade barriers can harm developing countries. Trade liberalization that is too early without any prominent domestic barriers is feared to trap the developing economies in the primary sector, which often does not require skilled labor. Also, when these developing countries decide to advance their economy utilizing industrialization, the premature domestic industry cannot immediately skyrocket as expected, making it difficult to compete with other countries whose industries are more advanced.

The WTO has been criticized for not sufficiently preventing trade distortions due to market domination and anti-competitive practices, as exemplified by the rare earths trade dispute and export cartels like OPEC+.

Like in previous conferences at the highest level of WTO, the 14th Ministerial Conference held in Yaoundé from 26–29 March 2026 was unable to reach any formal decisions on reforms or on the further development of the WTO. It meekly concluded with the chairperson’s personal summary and a commitment to continue work in Geneva on key outstanding issues.

In an interview with the Neue Zürcher Zeitung (NZZ) entitled ‘I’ve had enough of the whingeing’, Director-General Ngozi Okonjo Iweala insisted that the rise in protectionism since 2009 could not be blamed on the WTO, and that diversification was still essential; she recommended maintaining the best possible relations with each of the major trading partners. The WTO rules therefore remained fundamentally important; however, they were also part of the problem. Ngozi emphasised the need for reform in the areas of subsidy and competition rules, decision-making, the involvement of developing countries, and global public goods such as pandemic responses and climate protection. Over 60 countries had accepted ‘plurilateral’ WTO agreements on digital trade and the modernisation of trade in services. The WTO Director-General expressed her conviction that the relevant ministers had recognised the need for reform – adding that only with these reforms the WTO would remain relevant to all.

== See also ==
- Agreement on Trade Related Investment Measures
- Anti-globalization movement
- China and the World Trade Organization
- Criticism of the World Trade Organization
- Dispute settlement in the World Trade Organization
- Foreign Affiliate Trade Statistics
- Geographical Indications of Goods (Registration and Protection) Act, 1999
- Global administrative law
- Information Technology Agreement
- International Trade Centre
- Labour standards in the World Trade Organization
- Non-tariff barriers to trade
- North American Free Trade Agreement
- Swiss Formula
- Trade bloc
- UNIDROIT
- United Nations Commission on International Trade Law (UNCITRAL)
- Washington Consensus
- World Trade Organization Ministerial Conference of 1999 protest activity
- World Trade Report
