= Global administrative law =

Principles and mechanisms of global administrative action

Global administrative law is an emerging field that is based upon a dual insight: that much of what is usually termed “global governance” can be accurately characterized as administrative action; and that increasingly such action is itself being regulated by administrative law-type principles, rules and mechanisms – in particular those relating to participation, transparency, accountability and review. GAL, then, refers to the structures, procedures and normative standards for regulatory decision-making including transparency, participation, and review, and the rule-governed mechanisms for implementing these standards, that are applicable to formal intergovernmental regulatory bodies; to informal intergovernmental regulatory networks; to regulatory decisions of national governments where these are part of or constrained by an international intergovernmental regime; and to hybrid public-private or private transnational bodies. The focus of this field is not the specific content of substantive rules, but rather the operation of existing or possible principles, procedural rules and reviewing and other mechanisms relating to accountability, transparency, participation, and assurance of legality in global governance.

== Overview ==
Today almost all human activity is subject to some form of global regulation. Goods and activities that are beyond the effective control of any one State are regulated at the global level. Global regulatory regimes cover a vast array of different subject-areas, including forest preservation, the control of fishing, water regulation, environmental protection, arms control, food safety and standardization, financial and accounting standards, internet governance, pharmaceuticals regulation, intellectual property protection, refugee protection, coffee and cocoa standards, labour standards, antitrust regulation, to name but a very few. This increase in the number and scope of regulatory regimes has been matched by the huge growth of international organizations: nowadays over 2,000 intergovernmental organizations (IGO) and around 40,000 Non-governmental organizations (NGO) are operating worldwide.

There are, of course, great differences among the various different types of regulatory regimes. Some merely provide a framework for State action, whereas others establish guidelines addressed to domestic administrative agencies, and others still impact directly upon national civil society actors. Some regulatory regimes create their own implementation mechanisms, while others rely on national or regional authorities for this task. To settle disputes, some regulatory regimes have established judicial (or quasi-judicial) bodies, or refer to those of different regimes; while others resort to “softer” forms, such as negotiation. Within this framework, the traditional mechanisms based on State consent as expressed through treaties or custom are simply no longer capable of accounting for all global activities.

A new regulatory space is emerging, distinct from that of inter-State relations, transcending the sphere of influence of both international law and domestic administrative law: this can be defined as the global administrative space. IOs have become much more than instruments of the governments of their Member States; rather, they set their own norms and regulate their field of activity; they generate and follow their own, particular legal proceedings; and they can grant participatory rights to subjects, both public and private, affected by their activities. Ultimately, they have emerged as genuine global public administrations. In other words, the structures, procedures and normative standards for regulatory decision-making applicable to global institutions (including transparency, participation, and review), and the rule-governed mechanisms for implementing these standards are coming to form a specific field of legal theory and practice: that of global administrative law. The main focus of this emerging field is not the particular content of substantive rules generated by global regulatory institutions, but rather the actual or potential application of principles, procedural rules and reviewing and other mechanisms relating to accountability, transparency, participation, and the rule of law in global governance.

== Bibliographical references ==
=== Overview articles ===
- Sabino CASSESE, “Administrative Law without the State? The Challenge of Global Regulation”, 37 New York University Journal of International Law and Politics 663 (2005)
- Benedict KINGSBURY, Nico KRISCH and Richard B. STEWART, "The Emergence of Global Administrative Law", 68 Law and Contemporary Problems 15 (2005)

=== Casebooks ===
- Global Administrative Law: The Casebook (3rd edition, 2012), edited by Sabino CASSESE, Bruno CAROTTI, Lorenzo CASINI, Eleonora CAVALIERI, and Euan MACDONALD
- Global Administrative Law: Cases, Materials, Issues (2nd edition, 2008), edited by Sabino CASSESE, Bruno CAROTTI, Lorenzo CASINI, Marco MACCHIA, Euan MACDONALD, and Mario SAVINO
- Global Administrative Law: Cases and Materials (1st edition, 2006)

=== Essays and other relevant publications ===
- Stefano BATTINI, Giulio VESPERINI (eds.), Global and European Constraints Upon National Right to Regulate: the Service Sector (February 29, 2008)
- Lorenzo CASINI, “Diritto amministrativo globale”, in Sabino CASSESE (dir.), Dizionario di diritto pubblico, Milano (2006), ad vocem
- Daniel C. ESTY, “Good Governance at the Supranational Scale: Globalizing Administrative Law”, 115 Yale Law Journal 1490 (2006)
- Nico KRISCH, Benedict KINGSBURY (eds.), Symposium on “Global Governance and Global Administrative Law in the International Legal Order”, 17 European Journal of International Law, no. 1 (2006)
- NYU School of Law-IIILJ, GAL Working Papers Series
- NYU School of Law-IIILJ, GAL Emerging Scholars Working Papers Series

=== Bibliographical resources ===
- "General Bibliography", from Global Administrative Law: The Casebook (3rd edition, 2012)
- "General Bibliography", from Global Administrative Law: Cases, Materials, Issues (2nd edition, 2008)
- GAL Bibliography Update (Maurizia De Bellis, June 2006)
- Diritto amministrativo globale: Bibliografia (Bruno Carotti and Lorenzo Casini, 2006)
- "A Global Administrative Law Bibliography", 68 Law and Contemporary Problems 357 (2005)
- "GAL Bibliography", ed. by Euan MacDonald, on the NYU-IILJ Website

== Relevant institutions and research projects ==
- The Global Administrative Law (GAL) Project based in the Institute for International Law and Justice (IILJ) - New York University School of Law.
- The Max-Planck-Institut für ausländisches öffentliches Recht und Völkerrecht at Heidelberg has a GAL project with case studies of international administration (in English).
- The Istituto di Ricerche sulla Pubblica Amministrazione (IRPA), an Italian non profit organization founded in 2004 by Professor Sabino Cassese and other professors of administrative law, promotes advanced studies and research projects on GAL.
- The European University Institute in Florence has a project on self-regulation led by Professor Fabrizio Cafaggi.
- The Global Economic Governance Programme at Oxford University, directed by Professor Ngaire Woods.
- The Bremen Project, a Collaborative Research Center established in January 2003, supported by the University of Bremen, the International University (Bremen), and the Bremen University of Applied Sciences.
- La Chaire Mutations de L'Action Publique et du Droit Public (MADP), a professorship established under Professor Jean-Bernard Auby at Sciences Po (Paris).
