= World Trade Organization Ministerial Conference of 2001 =

WTO trade conference in Doha, Qatar

Fourth Ministerial Conference of the World Trade Organization

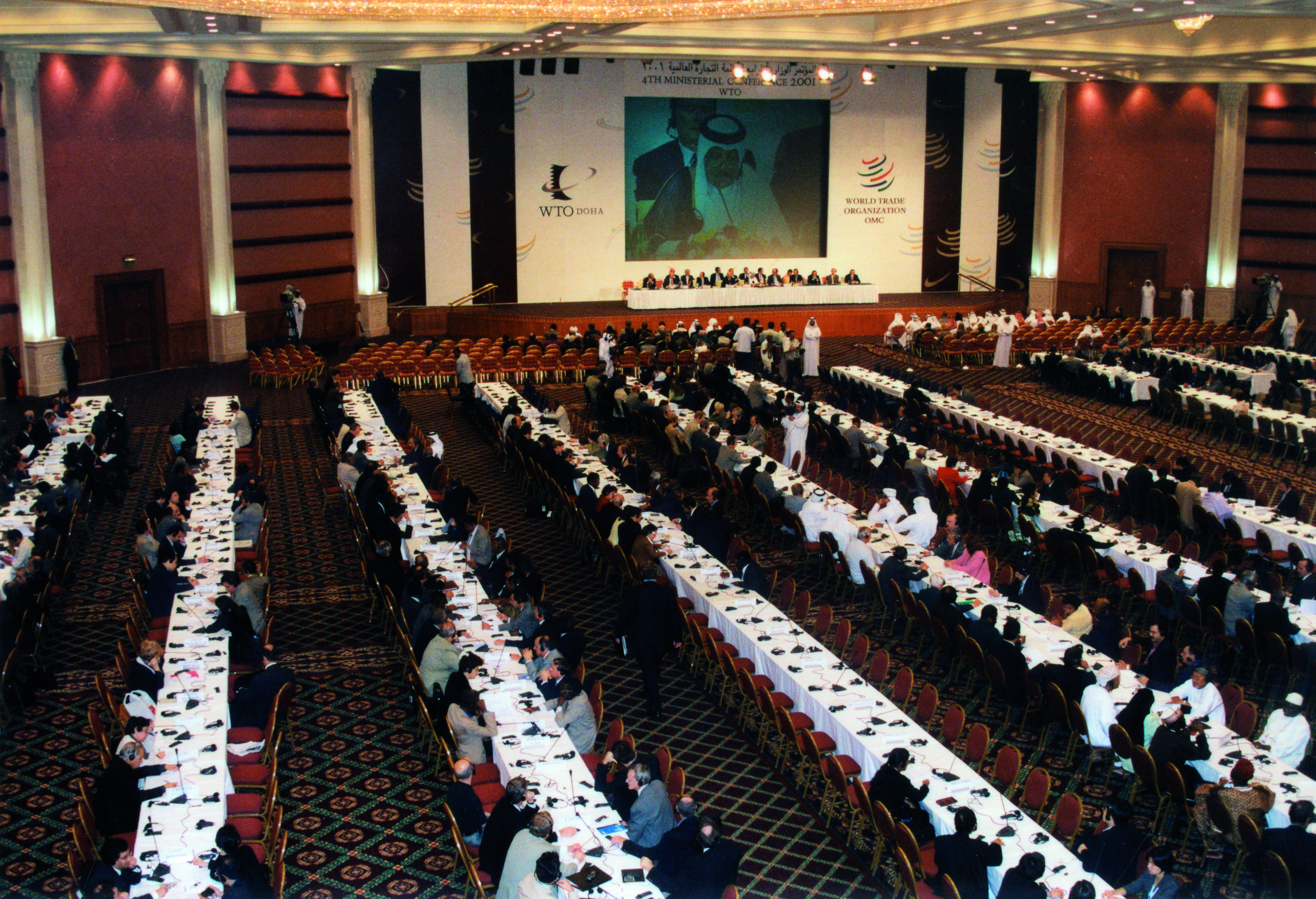
- Dais of speakers and banners at the Doha WTO Ministerial Conference
- Country: Doha, Qatar
- Previous event: World Trade Organization Ministerial Conference of 1999
- Next event: World Trade Organization Ministerial Conference of 2003
- Participants: World Trade Organization member countries

The Fourth Ministerial Conference of the World Trade Organization, also known as the WTO Fourth Ministerial Conference or MC4, was held at the Sheraton Doha Hotel and Resort, Doha, Qatar from November 9–13, 2001. At this conference, ministers from all WTO members launched the Doha Development Agenda.

== History ==
At the 2001 conference, trade ministers agreed to undertake a brand new round of multilateral trade negotiations and services. The ministers passed two declarations. The first, the main declaration, folded the ongoing negotiations in agriculture and services into a broader agenda, which is commonly known as the Doha Development Round. In addition. the Doha agenda included the topic of industrial tariffs, topics of interest to developing countries, changes to WTO rules, and other provisions. The second declaration dealt with the Agreement on Trade-Related Aspects of Intellectual Property Rights (TRIPS) and allowed governments to be flexible with TRIPS to deal with health problems.

The meeting took place just two months after the World Trade Center attack. As a result, some government officials called for greater political cohesion and saw the trade negotiations as a means toward that end. Some officials thought that a new round of multilateral trade negotiations could help a world economy weakened by recession and terrorism-related uncertainty.

== Ministerial Declaration ==
The Doha Ministerial Declaration mandate for agriculture calls for comprehensive negotiations aimed at substantial improvements in market access; reductions of, with a view to phasing out, all forms of export subsidies; and substantial reductions in trade-distorting domestic support. These topics — domestic support, export subsidies, and market access — have become known as the three pillars of the agricultural negotiations. The Declaration also provides that special and differential treatment for developing countries would be an integral part of all elements of the negotiations. The Declaration took note of non-trade concerns reflected in negotiating proposals of various member countries and confirmed that they would be taken into account in the negotiations. March 31, 2003 was set as the deadline for reaching agreement on “modalities” (targets, formulas, timetables, etc.) for achieving the mandated objectives, but that deadline was missed. During the rest of 2003, negotiations on modalities continued in preparation for the fifth WTO Ministerial Conference held in Cancun, Mexico September 10–14, 2003.

== Intellectual property declaration ==
The Doha Declaration on Public Health sought to alleviate developing country dissatisfaction with aspects of the TRIPS regime. It delayed the implementation of patent system provisions for pharmaceutical products for least developed countries (LDCs) until 2016. The declaration committed member states to interpret and implement the agreement to support public health and to promote access to medicines for all. The Declaration recognized certain “flexibilities” in the TRIPS agreement to allow each member to grant compulsory licenses for pharmaceuticals and to determine what constitutes a national emergency, expressly including public health emergencies such as HIV/AIDS, malaria, and tuberculosis or other epidemics.

== China's accession to the WTO ==
The conference also approved the accession of China to the WTO on November 10.

== See also ==
- Doha Declaration
- Doha Development Round
