= Doha Development Round =

International trade negotiations

- The Doha Development Round logo.
- Status: On-going
- Genre: Trade Round
- Begins: November 2001
- Locations: Doha, Cancún, Geneva, Hong Kong, Paris, Potsdam
- Country: Qatar, Mexico, Switzerland, Hong Kong, France, Germany
- Previous event: Uruguay Round
- Participants: 164

The Doha Development Round or Doha Development Agenda (DDA) is the trade-negotiation round of the World Trade Organization (WTO) which commenced in November 2001 under then director-general Mike Moore. Its objective was to lower trade barriers around the world, and thus increase global trade.

The Doha Agenda began with a ministerial-level meeting in Doha, Qatar, in 2001. The aim was to put less developed countries' priorities at heart. The needs of the developing countries were the core reasons for the meeting. The major factors discussed include trade facilitation, services, rules of origin and dispute settlement. Special and differential treatment for the developing countries were also discussed as a major concern. Subsequent ministerial meetings took place in Cancún, Mexico (2003), and Hong Kong (2005). Related negotiations took place in Paris, France (2005), Potsdam, Germany (2007), and Geneva, Switzerland (2004, 2006, 2008). Progress in negotiations stalled after the breakdown of the July 2008 negotiations.

The most significant differences are between developed nations led by the European Union (EU), the United States (US), Canada, and Japan and the major developing countries led and represented mainly by India, Brazil, China, and South Africa. There is also considerable contention against and between the EU and the US over their maintenance of agricultural subsidies—seen to operate effectively as trade barriers. Since the breakdown of negotiations in 2008, there have been repeated attempts to revive the talks, so far without success. Intense negotiations, mostly between the US, China, and India, were held at the end of 2008 seeking agreement on negotiation modalities, an impasse which was not resolved. In April 2011, then director-general Pascal Lamy "asked members to think hard about 'the consequences of throwing away ten years of solid multilateral work'." A report to the WTO General Council by Lamy in May 2012 advocated "small steps, gradually moving forward the parts of the Doha Round which were mature, and re-thinking those where greater differences remained." Adoption of the Bali Ministerial Declaration on 7 December 2013 for the first time successfully addressed bureaucratic barriers to commerce—a small part of the Doha Round agenda.

In 2015, the United States government called for an end to the Doha round, and by 2017 it was declared "dead" by numerous commentators, including the Financial Times. However, the World Trade Organization states that the 2015 Ministerial Meeting in Nairobi "agreed [that] a strong commitment remained among all members to advance negotiations on the remaining Doha issues", and many issues "remain open".

== Negotiations ==
Doha Round talks are overseen by the Trade Negotiations Committee (TNC), whose chair is the WTO’s director-general, currently Ngozi Okonjo-Iweala. The negotiations are being held in five working groups and in other existing bodies of the WTO. Selected topics under negotiation are discussed below in five groups: market access, development issues, WTO rules, trade facilitation and other issues.

=== Before Doha ===
Before the Doha ministerial, negotiations had already been under way on trade in agriculture and trade in services. These ongoing negotiations had been required under the last round of multilateral trade negotiations (the Uruguay Round, 1986–1994). However, some countries, including the United States, wanted to expand the agriculture and services talks to allow trade-offs and thus achieve greater trade liberalization.

The first WTO ministerial conference, which was held in Singapore in 1996, established permanent working groups on four issues: transparency in government procurement, trade facilitation (customs issues), trade and investment, and trade and competition. These became known as the Singapore issues. These issues were pushed at successive ministerials by the European Union, Japan and Korea, and opposed by most developing countries. Since no agreement was reached, the developed nations pushed that any new trade negotiations must include the mentioned issues.

The negotiations were intended to start at the ministerial conference of 1999 in Seattle, and be called the Millennium Round but, due to several different events including protest activity outside the conference (the so-called "Battle of Seattle"), the negotiations were never started. Due to the failure of the Millennium Round, it was decided that negotiations would not start again until the next ministerial conference in 2001 in Doha, Qatar.

Just months before the Doha ministerial, the United States had been attacked by terrorists on 11 September 2001. Some government officials called for greater political cohesion and saw the trade negotiations as a means toward that end. Some officials thought that a new round of multilateral trade negotiations could help a world economy weakened by recession and terrorism-related uncertainty. According to the WTO, the year 2001 showed "...the lowest growth in output in more than two decades," and world trade contracted that year.

=== Doha, 2001 ===
The Doha round officially began in November 2001, committing all countries to negotiations opening agricultural and manufacturing markets, as well as trade-in-services (GATS) negotiations and expanded intellectual property regulation (TRIPS). John Tsang, then Hong Kong's Secretary for Commerce, Industry and Technology and chair of the 2005 Sixth Ministerial Conference of the World Trade Organization, MC6, noted that the conference took place "in the aftermath of the 9/11 incident in the US", and set the conference's "ambitious" agenda within this context. The intent of the round, according to its proponents, was to make trade rules fairer for developing countries. However, by 2008, critics were charging that the round would expand a system of trade rules which were bad for development and interfered excessively with countries' domestic "policy space".

The 2001 ministerial declaration established an official deadline for concluding negotiations for the Doha round on 1 January 2005.

=== Cancún, 2003 ===
The 2003 Cancún talks—intended to forge concrete agreement on the Doha round objectives—collapsed after four days during which the members could not agree on a framework to continue negotiations. Low key talks continued since the ministerial meeting in Doha but progress was almost non-existent. This meeting was intended to create a framework for further negotiations.

The Cancún ministerial collapsed for several reasons. First, differences over the Singapore issues seemed incapable of resolution. The EU had retreated on few of its demands, but several developing countries refused any consideration of these issues at all. Second, it was questioned whether some countries had come to Cancún with a serious intention to negotiate. In the view of some observers, a few countries showed no flexibility in their positions and only repeated their demands rather than talk about trade-offs. Third, the wide difference between developing and developed countries across virtually all topics was a major obstacle. The US–EU agricultural proposal and that of the G20 developing nations, for example, show strikingly different approaches to special and differential treatment. Fourth, there was some criticism of procedure. Some claimed the agenda was too complicated. Also, Cancún ministerial chairman, Mexico’s Foreign Minister Luis Ernesto Derbez, was faulted for ending the meeting when he did, instead of trying to move the talks into areas where some progress could have been made.

The collapse seemed like a victory for the developing countries. The failure to advance the round resulted in a serious loss of momentum and brought into question whether 1 January 2005 deadline would be met. The North-South divide was most prominent on issues of agriculture. Developed countries' farm subsidies (both the EU’s Common Agricultural Policy and the US government agro-subsidies) became a major sticking point. The developing countries were seen as finally having the confidence to reject a deal that they viewed as unfavorable. This is reflected by the new trade bloc of developing and industrialized nations: the G20. Since its creation, the G20 has had fluctuating membership, but is spearheaded by the G4 (the People's Republic of China, India, Brazil, and South Africa). While the G20 presumes to negotiate on behalf of all of the developing world, many of the poorest nations continue to have little influence over the emerging WTO proposals. In dispute resolution mechanism of the WTO regime, the collapse of the Doha Round talks at Cancun in September 2003 has been attributed to Subsidies in agriculture and agricultural domestic support policies of developed nations

=== Geneva, 2004 ===
The aftermath of Cancún was one of standstill and stocktaking. Negotiations were suspended for the remainder of 2003. Starting in early 2004, US Trade Representative Robert Zoellick pushed for the resumption of negotiations by offering a proposal that would focus on market access, including an elimination of agricultural export subsidies. He also said that the Singapore issues could progress by negotiating on trade facilitation, considering further action on government procurement, and possibly dropping investment and competition. This intervention was credited at the time with reviving interest in the negotiations, and negotiations resumed in March 2004.

In the months leading up to the talks in Geneva, the EU accepted the elimination of agricultural export subsidies "by date certain". The Singapore issues were moved off the Doha agenda. Compromise was also achieved over the negotiation of the Singapore issues as the EU and others decided. Developing countries too played an active part in negotiations this year, first by India and Brazil negotiating directly with the developed countries (as the so-called "non-party of five") on agriculture, and second by working toward acceptance of trade facilitation as a subject for negotiation.

With these issues pushed aside, the negotiators in Geneva were able to concentrate on moving forward with the Doha Round. After intense negotiations in late July 2004, WTO members reached what has become known as the Framework Agreement(sometimes called the July Package), which provides broad guidelines for completing the Doha round negotiations. The agreement contains a 4-page declaration, with four annexes (A–D) covering agriculture, non-agricultural market access, services, and trade facilitation, respectively. In addition, the agreement acknowledges the activities of other negotiating groups (such as those on rules, dispute settlement, and intellectual property) and exhorts them to fulfill their Doha round negotiating objectives. The agreement also abandoned the 1 January 2005 deadline for the negotiations and set December 2005 as the date for the 6th ministerial to be held in Hong Kong.

=== Paris, 2005 ===
Trade negotiators wanted to make tangible progress before the December 2005 WTO meeting in Hong Kong, and held a session of negotiations in Paris in May 2005.

Paris talks were hanging over a few issues: France protested moves to cut subsidies to farmers, while the US, Australia, the EU, Brazil and India failed to agree on issues relating to chicken, beef and rice. Most of the sticking points were small technical issues, making trade negotiators fear that agreement on large politically risky issues will be substantially harder.

=== Hong Kong, 2005 ===
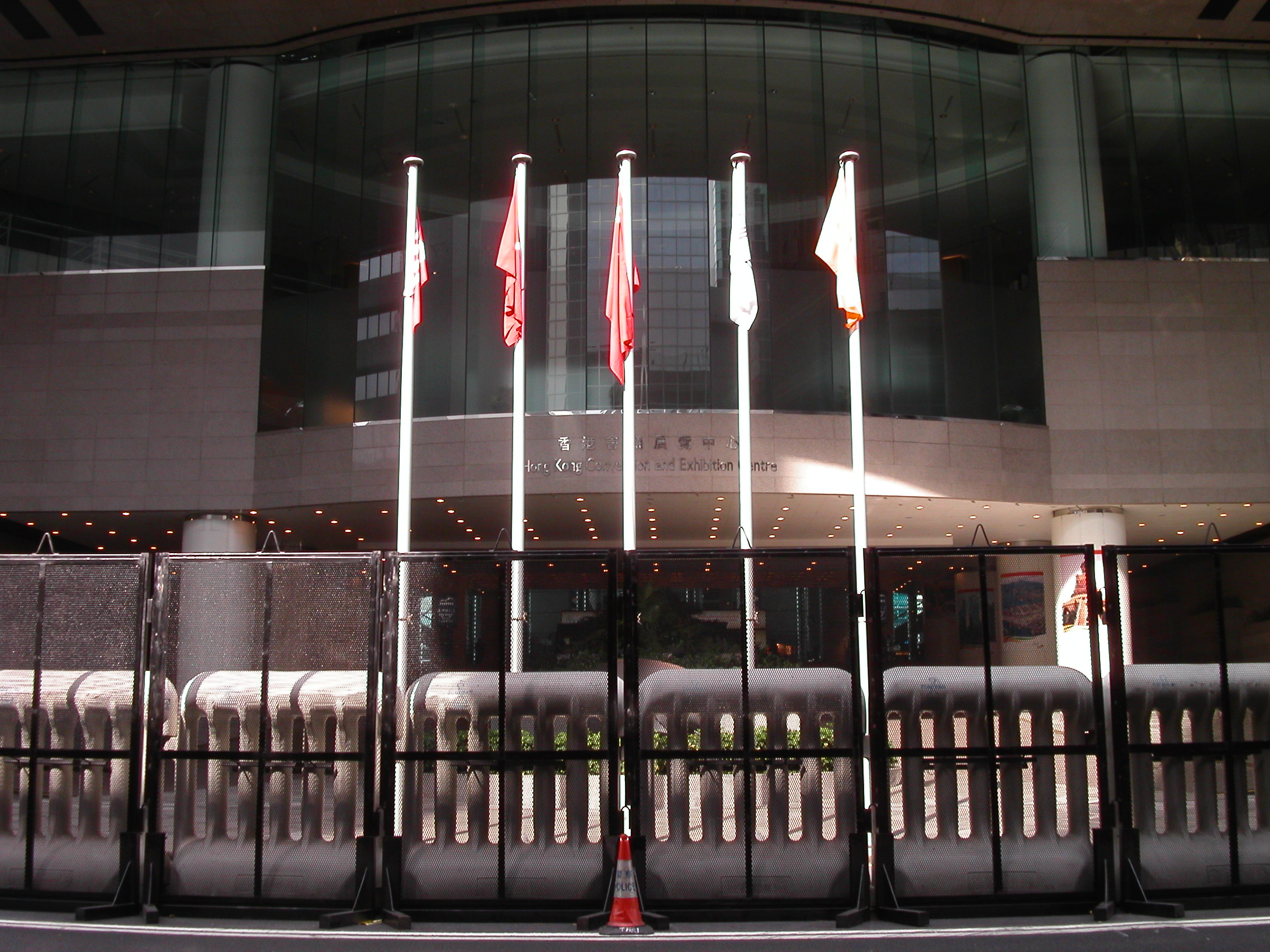
The Hong Kong Convention Center, which was the site of the Sixth WTO Ministerial Conference

The Sixth WTO Ministerial Conference took place in Hong Kong, 13 to 18 December 2005. Although a flurry of negotiations took place in the fall of 2005, WTO director-general Pascal Lamy announced in November 2005 that a comprehensive agreement on modalities would not be forthcoming in Hong Kong, and that the talks would "take stock" of the negotiations and would try to reach agreements in negotiating sectors where convergence was reported.

Trade ministers representing most of the world's governments reached a deal that sets a deadline for eliminating subsidies of agricultural exports by 2013. The final declaration from the talks, which resolved several issues that have stood in the way of a global trade agreement, also requires industrialized countries to open their markets to goods from the world's poorest nations, a goal of the United Nations for many years. The declaration gave fresh impetus for negotiators to try to finish a comprehensive set of global free trade rules by the end of 2006. Director-general Pascal Lamy said, "I now believe it is possible, which I did not a month ago."

The conference pushed back the expected completion of the round until the end of 2006.

The round had been planned for conclusion in December 2005—after two more ministerial conferences had produced a final draft declaration. The WTO pushed back its self-imposed deadline to slightly precede the expiration of the US President's Congressional Fast Track Trade Promotion Authority. Any declaration of the WTO must be ratified by the Congress to take effect in the United States. Trade Promotion Authority prevents Congress from amending the draft. It expired on 30 June 2007, and congressional leaders decided not to renew this authority for President George W Bush.

=== Geneva, 2006 ===
The July 2006 talks in Geneva failed to reach an agreement about reducing farming subsidies and lowering import taxes, and negotiations took months to resume. A successful outcome of the Doha round became increasingly unlikely, because the broad trade authority granted under the Trade Act of 2002 to President George W. Bush was due to expire in 2007. Any trade pact would then have to be approved by the Congress with the possibility of amendments, which would hinder the US negotiators and decrease the willingness of other countries to participate. Hong Kong offered to mediate the collapsed trade liberalisation talks. Director-general of Trade and Industry, Raymond Young, says the territory, which hosted the last round of Doha negotiations, has a "moral high-ground" on free trade that allows it to play the role of "honest broker".

=== Potsdam, 2007 ===
In June 2007, negotiations within the Doha round broke down at a conference in Potsdam, as a major impasse occurred between the US, the EU, India and Brazil. The main disagreement was over opening up agricultural and industrial markets in various countries and how to cut rich nation farm subsidies.

=== Geneva, 2008 ===
On 21 July 2008, negotiations started again at the WTO's HQ in Geneva on the Doha round but stalled after nine days of negotiations over the refusal to compromise over the special safeguard mechanism. "Developing country members receive special and differential treatment with respect to other members' safeguard measures, in the form of a de minimis import volume exemption. As users of safeguards, developing country members receive special and differential treatment with respect to applying their own such measures, with regard to permitted duration of extensions, and with respect to re-application of measures.

Negotiations had continued since the last conference in June 2007. Director-general Pascal Lamy said before the start of the conference that the odds of success were over 50%. Around 40 ministers attended the negotiations, which were only expected to last five days but instead lasted nine days. Kamal Nath, India's Commerce Minister, was absent from the first few days of the conference due to a vote of confidence being conducted in India's Parliament. On the second day of the conference, U.S. Trade Representative Susan Schwab announced that the US would cap its farm subsidies at $15 billion a year, from $18.2 billion in 2006. The proposal was on the condition that countries such as Brazil and India drop their objections to various aspects of the round. The US and the EU also offered an increase in the number of temporary work visas for professional workers. After one week of negotiations, many considered agreement to be 'within reach'. However, there were disagreements on issues including special protection for Chinese and Indian farmers and African and Caribbean banana imports to the EU. India and China's hard stance regarding tariffs and subsidies was severely criticized by the United States. In response, India's Commerce Minister said "I'm not risking the livelihood of millions of farmers."

The negotiations collapsed on 29 July over issues of agricultural trade between the United States, India, and China. In particular, there was insoluble disagreement between India and the United States over the special safeguard mechanism (SSM), a measure designed to protect poor farmers by allowing countries to impose a special tariff on certain agricultural goods in the event of an import surge or price fall.

Pascal Lamy said, "Members have simply not been able to bridge their differences." He also said that out of a to-do list of 20 topics, 18 had seen positions converge but the gaps could not narrow on the 19th—the special safeguard mechanism for developing countries. However, the United States, China and India could not agree on the threshold that would allow the mechanism to be used, with the United States arguing that the threshold had been set too low. The European Union Trade Commissioner Peter Mandelson characterized the collapse as a "collective failure". On a more optimistic note, India's Commerce Minister, Kamal Nath, said "I would only urge the director-general to treat this [failure of talks] as a pause, not a breakdown, to keep on the table what is there."

Several countries blamed each other for the breakdown of the negotiations. The United States and some European Union members blamed India for the failure of the talks. India claimed that its position (i.e. that the US was sacrificing the world's poor for US/European commercial interests) was supported by over 100 countries. Brazil, one of the founding members of the G-20, broke away from the position held by India. Then-European Commissioner for Trade Peter Mandelson said that India and China should not be blamed for the failure of the Doha round. In his view, the agriculture talks had been harmed by the five-year program of agricultural subsidies recently passed by the U.S. Congress, which he said was "one of the most reactionary farm bills in the history of the U.S.".

=== Nairobi, 2015 ===
On 19 December 2015, a WTO meeting in the Kenyan Capital led to an agreement for developed countries to end export subsidies immediately and developing countries to follow by the end of 2018.

=== Buenos Aires, 2017 ===
The 11th Ministerial Conference held in Buenos Aires failed to reach agreement both on specific issues and on the continuance of the Doha Round. .

=== Geneva, 2022 (MC12) ===
The 12th Ministerial Conference, deferred because of the COVID-19 pandemic, took place in Geneva and was co-hosted by Kazakhstan, from 12 to 17 June 2022. Proposals on special and differential treatment, "based on the Doha Ministerial Declaration" of 2001, were put forward at MC12. The Doha Round is still in place "on paper". The WTO recognised some continuity with Doha, referring to its Ministerial Declaration as "guiding the WTO's work on special and differential treatment since 2001".

== Attempts to restore ==
In 2008, several countries called for negotiations to start again. Luiz Inácio Lula da Silva, during his first term as president of Brazil, called several countries' leaders to urge them to renew negotiations. The director-general and chair of the Trade Negotiations Committee Pascal Lamy visited India to discuss possible solutions to the impasse. A mini-ministerial meeting held in India on 3 and 4 September 2008 pledged to complete the round by the end of 2010. The declaration at the end of the G20 summit of world leaders in London in 2009 included a pledge to complete the Doha round. Although a WTO ministerial conference scheduled in November 2009 would not be a negotiating session, there would be several opportunities in 2009 to discuss the progress. The WTO is involved in several events every year that provide opportunities to discuss and advance trade negotiations at a conceptual level.

In early 2010, Brazil and Lamy focused on the role of the United States in overcoming the deadlock. President Lula urged Barack Obama to end a trade dispute between Brazil and the US over cotton subsidies after the WTO gave Brazil the formal go-ahead in 2009 to impose sanctions on imports of over 100 US goods. Lamy highlighted the difficulty of obtaining agreement from the US without the presidential fast-track authority and biennial elections. One of the consequences of the economic crisis of 2008–2009 is the desire of political leaders to shelter their constituents from the increasingly competitive market experienced during market contractions. Lamy hoped that the drop in trade of 12% in 2009, quoted as the largest annual drop since the Second World War, could be countered by successful conclusion of the Doha round.

At the 2011 annual conference of the World Economic Forum in Davos, British prime minister David Cameron called for the Doha talks to conclude by the end of the year, saying that "We've been at this Doha round for far too long. It's frankly ridiculous that it has taken 10 years to do this deal." Peter Sutherland, a former WTO director-general, called for the talks to be concluded in December that year. That hope having failed to eventuate, Pascal Lamy "reported to the General Council on 1 May 2012 that on the Doha Round, 'my conversations over the past few weeks with ministers and delegations have provided me with a sense that members wish to continue to explore any opportunities to gain the necessary traction and make tangible progress soon'."

In December 2013, under new director-general Roberto Azevêdo, negotiations of the Ninth Ministerial Conference held in Nusa Dua, Bali, Indonesia produced agreement on a "Bali Package", addressing a small portion of the Doha programme, principally bureaucratic "red tape". Because of the controversial nature of reforming laws on intellectual property, trade in services and subsidising crops for Food Security, the talks focused on trade facilitation, which means lowering cross-border tariffs and other regulations which impede international trade. However, there was still some controversy over this, with Cuba threatening to oppose any deal which did not affect the US embargo on Cuba. The trade facilitation measures agreed in Bali could cut the cost of shipping goods around the world by more than 10%, by one estimate, raising global output by over $400 billion a year, with benefits flowing disproportionately to poorer countries. It was claimed that the Bali Package, if implemented in full, could boost the global economy by US$1 trillion and create 21 million new jobs. The Bali agreement included a 12-month deadline for the development of "a clearly defined work programme" on the remaining issues. The alternative to the WTO was seen as a proliferation of bilateral and regional agreements and, in the case of agriculture, the increased use of private standards.

== Issues ==
Agriculture has become the lynchpin of the agenda for both developing and developed countries. Three other issues have been important. The first, now resolved, pertained to compulsory licensing of medicines and patent protection. A second deals with a review of provisions giving special and differential treatment to developing countries; a third addresses problems that developing countries are having in implementing current trade obligations.

=== Agriculture ===
As of 2008, agriculture had become the most important and controversial issue. Agriculture has been particularly important for developing countries, because around 75% of the population in developing countries live in rural areas, and the vast majority are dependent on agriculture for their livelihoods. The first proposal in Qatar, in 2001, called for the end agreement to commit to "substantial improvements in market access; reductions of, with a view to phasing out, all forms of export subsidies; and substantial reductions in trade-distorting domestic support."

As of 2013 the European Union (EU) and the developing countries, led by Brazil and India, asked the United States to make a more generous offer for reducing trade-distorting domestic support for agriculture. The United States has been insisting that the EU and the developing countries agree to make more substantial reductions in tariffs and to limit the number of import-sensitive and special products that would be exempt from cuts. Import-sensitive products are of most concern to developed countries like the EU, while developing countries are concerned with special products – those exempt from both tariff cuts and subsidy reductions because of development, food security, or livelihood considerations. Brazil has emphasized reductions in trade-distorting domestic subsidies, especially by the United States (some of which it successfully challenged in the WTO U.S.-Brazil cotton dispute), while India has insisted on a large number of special products that would not be exposed to wider market opening.

=== Access to patented medicines ===
A major topic at the Doha ministerial regarded the WTO Agreement on Trade-Related Aspects of Intellectual Property Rights (TRIPS). The issue involves the balance of interests between the pharmaceutical companies in developed countries that held patents on medicines and the public health needs in developing countries. Another issue concerns the protection of traditional medicinal knowledge and practices. Before the Doha meeting, the United States claimed that the current language in TRIPS was flexible enough to address public health emergencies, but other countries insisted on new language.

On 30 August 2003, WTO members reached agreement on the TRIPS and medicines issue. Voting in the General Council, member governments approved a decision that offered an interim waiver under the TRIPS Agreement allowing a member country to export pharmaceutical products made under compulsory licenses to least-developed and certain other members.

=== Special and differential treatment ===
In the Doha Ministerial Declaration, the trade ministers reaffirmed special and differential (S&D) treatment for developing countries and agreed that all S&D treatment provisions "...be reviewed with a view to strengthening them and making them more precise, effective and operational."

The negotiations have been split along a developing-country/developed-country divide. Developing countries wanted to negotiate on changes to S&D provisions, keep proposals together in the Committee on Trade and Development, and set shorter deadlines. Developed countries wanted to study S&D provisions, send some proposals to negotiating groups, and leave deadlines open. Developing countries claimed that the developed countries were not negotiating in good faith, while developed countries argued that the developing countries were unreasonable in their proposals. At the December 2005 Hong Kong ministerial, members agreed to five S&D provisions for least developed countries (LDCs), including the duty-free and quota-free access.

Research by the ODI sheds light on the priorities of the LDCs during the Doha round. It is argued that subsidies to agriculture, especially to cotton, unite developing countries in opposition more than SDT provisions and therefore have a greater consensus.

Duty-free and quota-free access (DFQFA) currently discussed covers 97% of tariff lines and if the US alone were to implement the initiative, it would potentially increase Least Developed Countries' (LDCs) exports by 10% (or $1bn). Many major trading powers already provide preferential access to LDCs through initiatives such as the Everything but Arms (EBA) initiative and the African Growth and Opportunity Act.

=== Implementation issues ===
Developing countries claim that they have had problems with the implementation of the agreements reached in the earlier Uruguay Round because of limited capacity or lack of technical assistance. They also claim that they have not realized certain benefits that they expected from the Round, such as increased access for their textiles and apparel in developed-country markets. They seek a clarification of language relating to their interests in existing agreements.

Before the Doha ministerial, WTO members resolved a small number of these implementation issues. At the Doha meeting, the Ministerial Declaration directed a two-path approach for the large number of remaining issues: (a) where a specific negotiating mandate is provided, the relevant implementation issues will be addressed under that mandate; and (b) the other outstanding implementation issues will be addressed as a matter of priority by the relevant WTO bodies. Outstanding implementation issues are found in the area of market access, investment measures, safeguards, rules of origin, and subsidies and countervailing measures, among others.

== Benefits ==
Most countries participating in the negotiations believe that there is some economic benefit in adopting the agreement; however, there is considerable disagreement of how much benefit the agreement would actually produce. A study by the University of Michigan found that if all trade barriers in agriculture, services, and manufactures were reduced by 33% as a result of the Doha Development Agenda, there would be an increase in global welfare of $574.0 billion. A 2008 study by World Bank Lead Economist Kym Anderson found that global income could increase by more than $3000 billion per year, $2500 billion of which would go to the developing world. Others had been predicting more modest outcomes, e.g. world net welfare gains ranging from $84 billion to $287 billion by the year 2015. Pascal Lamy has conservatively estimated that the deal will bring an increase of $130 billion.

Several think tanks and public organizations assess that the conclusion of the trade round will result in a net gain. However, the restructuring and adjustment costs required to prevent the collapse of local industries, particularly in developing countries, is a global concern. For example, a late 2009 study by the Carnegie Endowment for International Peace, the United Nations Economic Commission for Africa (UNECA), the United Nations Development Programme and the Kenyan Institute for Research and Policy Analysis found that Kenya would see gains in its exports of flowers, tea, coffee and oil seeds. It would concurrently lose in the tobacco and grains markets, as well as manufacturing of textiles and footwear, machinery and equipment.

The Copenhagen Consensus, which evaluates solutions for global problems regarding the cost-benefit ratio, in 2008 ranked the DDA as the second-best investment for global welfare, after the provision of vitamin supplements to the world's 140 million malnourished children.

== See also ==
- Safeguard
- Subsidy
- Trade bloc
- Copenhagen Consensus
- WTO Ministerial Conference of 1999
- Anti-Globalization
- Global administrative law
- Globality
