= Nissan Sunny =

Car model produced by Nissan

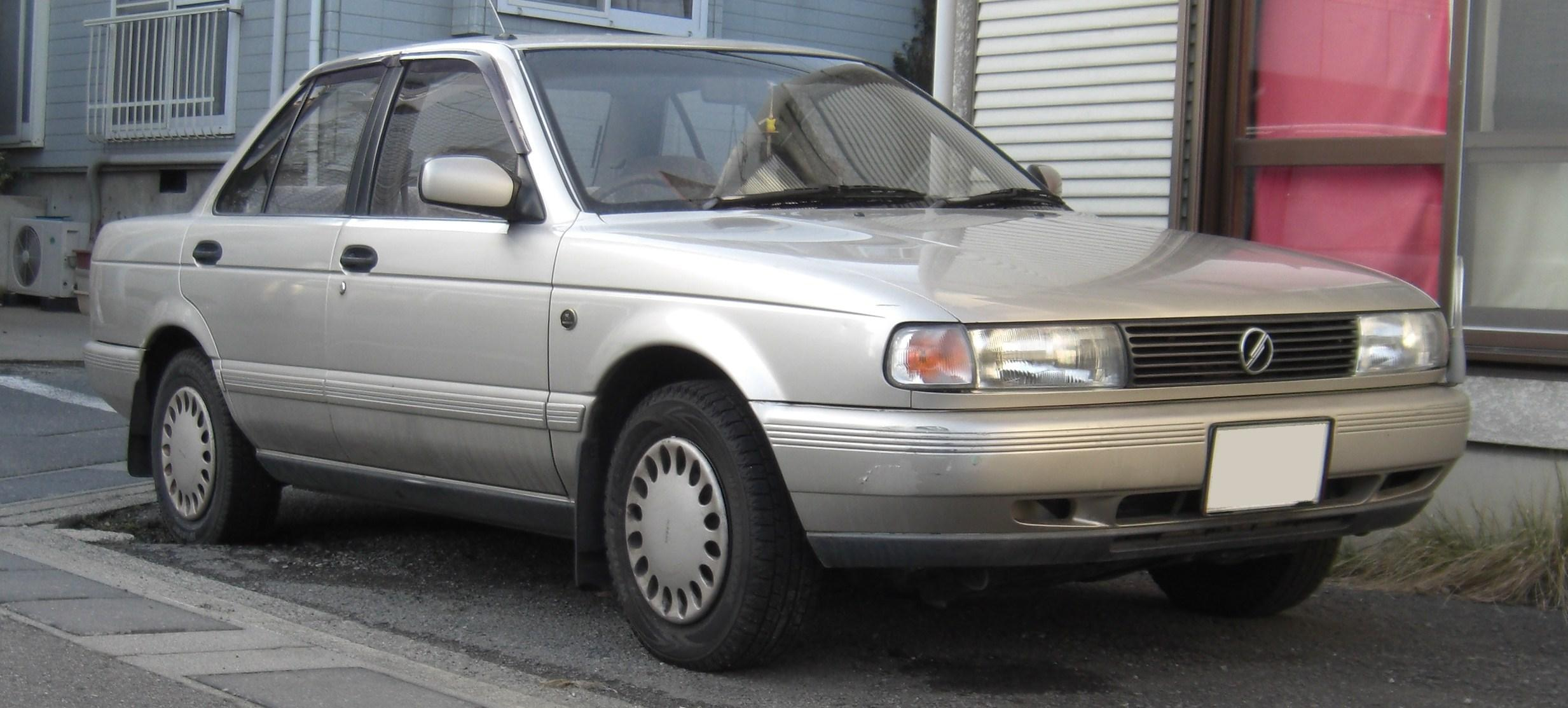
- Nissan Sunny (B13) in Japan

Overview
- Manufacturer: Nissan (Aichi Kikai)
- Also called: Nissan Sentra (1982–2006); Nissan Almera (2011–present)
- Production: 1966–present

Body and chassis
- Class: Subcompact car (1966–1998, 2011–present); Compact car (1998–2011)

Chronology
- Successor: Nissan Sentra (B16) (Americas); Nissan Bluebird Sylphy (G11)/Nissan Tiida (C11) (Asia); Nissan AD/Wingroad (station wagon)

The Nissan Sunny (Japanese: 日産・サニー, Hepburn: Nissan Sanī) is an automobile built by the Japanese automaker Nissan from 1966 until 2004. In the early 1980s, the brand changed from Datsun to Nissan in line with other models by the company. Although production of the Sunny in Japan ended in 2004, the name remains in use in China and GCC countries for a rebadged version of the Nissan Almera.

In North America, the later models were known as the Nissan Sentra; in Mexico, the Sunny is known as the Nissan Tsuru, which is Japanese for the bird species "crane". The latest versions of the Sunny were larger than the early models, and may be considered compact cars. Earlier versions (through at least the B11 series) were subcompact cars. All Sunnys through the 1982 model year (excepting the L-engined Sunny Excellents) used Nissan A engine motors. It was designed to compete with the Toyota Corolla.

The "Sunny" name has been used on other Nissan models, notably various export versions of the Nissan Pulsar model line. The Sunny has been imported and later manufactured worldwide under numerous names, and body styles, in economical, luxury and performance packages. Some configurations appear to be unique based on bodystyle appearances, but sharing a common platform. The Sunny was sold in Japan at a dedicated dealership sales channel called Nissan Satio Store, and rebadged versions later appeared at the other Japanese networks.

== First generation (B10; 1966) ==
B10
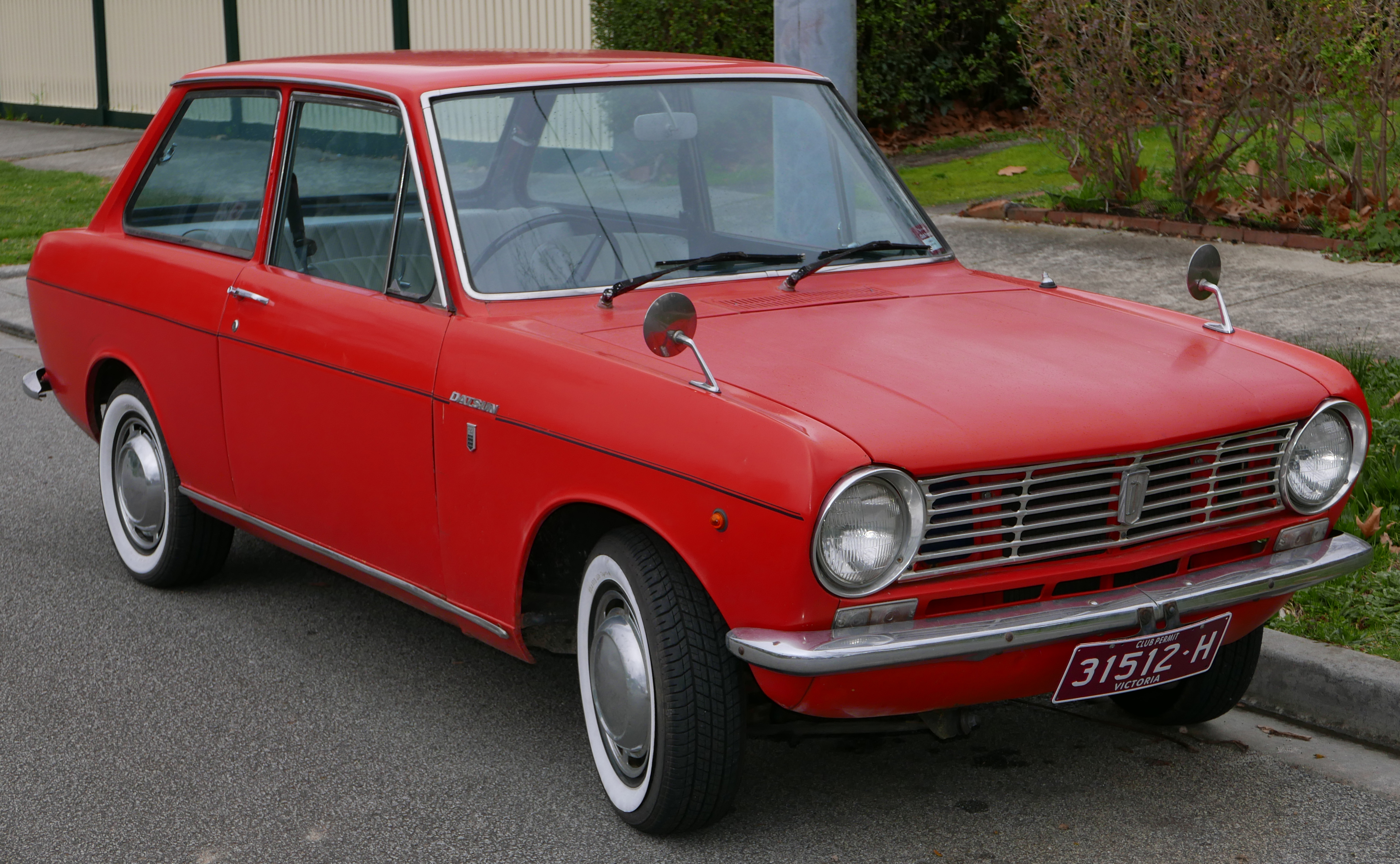
- Datsun 1000 DeLuxe two-door sedan (Australia)

Overview
- Also called: Datsun 1000
- Production: 1966–1969
- Assembly: Japan: Zama Plant, Zama, Kanagawa; Australia: Sydney (Pressed Metal Corporation); Australia: Clayton, Victoria (Nissan Australia)

Body and chassis
- Body style: 2/4-door sedan; 2-door coupé; 3-door station wagon/van
- Layout: Front-engine, rear-wheel-drive

Powertrain
- Engine: 988 cc A10 OHV I4
- Transmission: 3-speed manual; 4-speed manual (all-synchromesh); 3 speed automatic

Dimensions
- Wheelbase: 2,280 mm (89.8 in)
- Length: 3,820 mm (150.4 in)
- Width: 1,445 mm (56.9 in)
- Height: 1,295 mm (51.0 in)
- Curb weight: 625–705 kg (1,378–1,554 lb)

The first Datsun Sunny, exported as the Datsun 1000, was launched in September 1966 with two body styles, a two-door sedan (B10) and a van/station wagon (VB10). The Sunny was an all-new product built on a dedicated platform called the "B" series that benefited from Nissan's production of small cars since before the war and combined engineering efforts from newly acquired Aichi Manufacturing that met the goals set by Japan's Ministry of International Trade and Industry "national car" program. These were available in both a "Standard" and "Deluxe" version, featuring drum brakes, conventional leaf springs at the rear and wishbone type independent front end. The front end used a single transverse leaf spring. In Japan the car was sold at a dealership sales channel established just for the Sunny, called Nissan Satio Store. The Sunny was introduced in the same year as the Toyota Corolla and Subaru 1000.

In December 1965, Nissan held a national campaign in Japan to name its newest product in a mail-in ballot, and after receiving over eight million submissions, the name Sunny was chosen after having been suggested 3,105 times and was announced on 19 February 1966 by Yoshisuke Ayukawa, Nissan Motors founder.

The car featured a four-cylinder in-line engine, the A10, with a total displacement of 988 cc and a four-speed gearbox. The 1968 model, introduced in October 1967, added to the lineup the four-door sedan (B10) in both DeLuxe and Standard form. February 1968 saw the release of the new coupé (KB10). Marketed as the "Sunny Coupé" in Japan, it was available in a wide variety of levels from "Standard", to "GL" (Grand Luxe). The range of factory options and accessories was by this time vast. Total horsepower in the initial model was claimed to be 62 PS JIS Gross (46 kW) at 6,000 rpm. The engine displacement was kept below 1.0-litre to keep it in the lowest Japanese road tax bracket and encourage sales.

It introduced a new approach for Nissan in the 1960s where all mainstream products shared a similar appearance, as demonstrated in the larger Nissan President and Nissan Bluebird.

The only other country that seems to have received the coupé is Australia, where it was marketed as the "Datsun 1000 Coupé". It was well equipped, and was available only in the Deluxe level of trim. The Australian Deluxe model came standard with many inclusions that were available only as options in the Japanese model. The engine in the coupé had higher compression, a different Hitachi carburettor, and a dual outlet exhaust manifold. These changes increased its power output to 66 PS JIS Gross (49 kW); a 4 PS or 6.5 percent increase over the lesser models. Unlike the sedans and wagons, the coupé was only ever made in right drive.

July 1969 saw the release of the slightly different (cosmetically) 1970 model year, which left the 1969 model year run at only nine months. No additional models were added, and production ceased in December 1969, cutting the 1970 model year run at only six months.

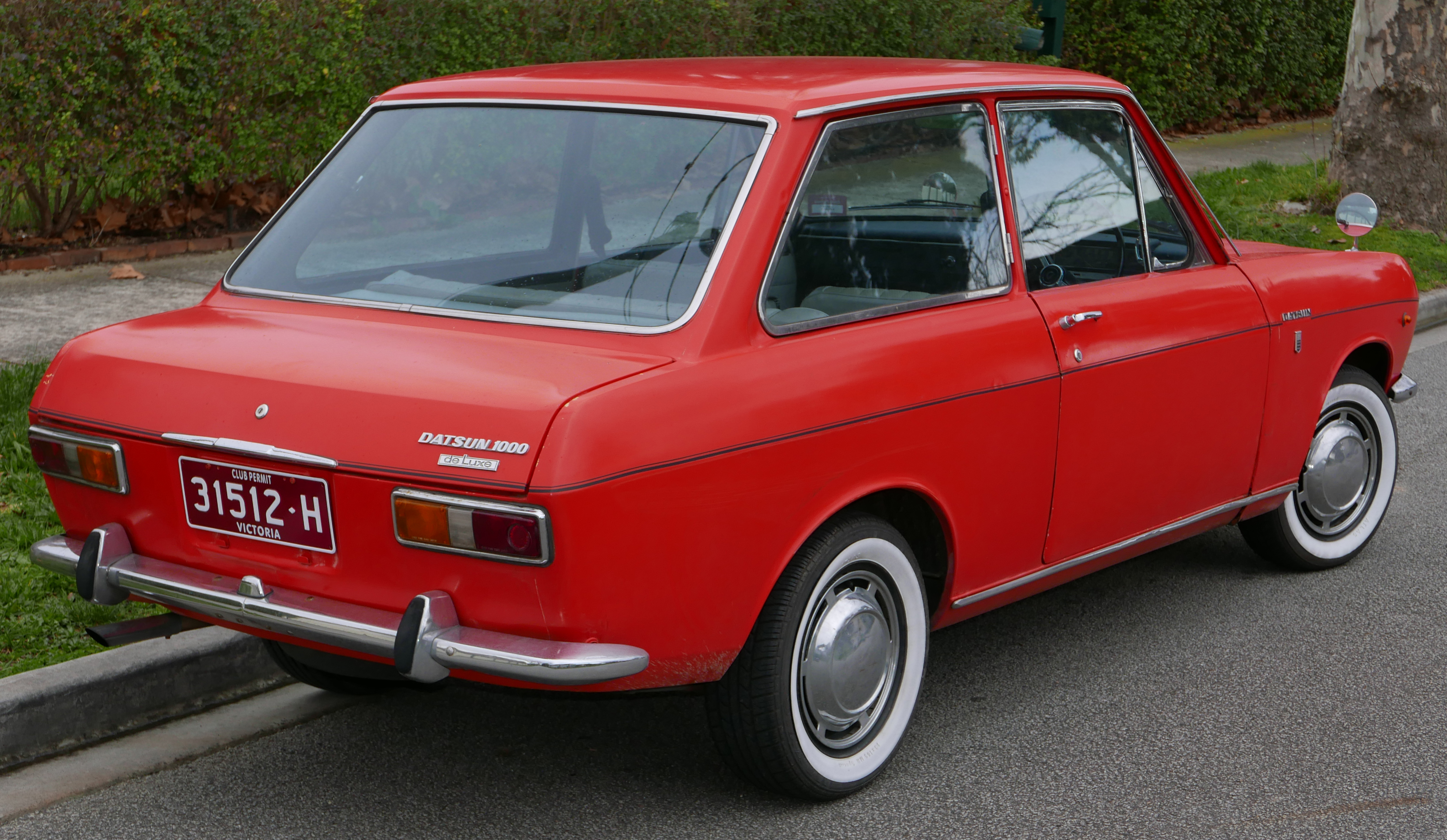
Datsun 1000 DeLuxe two-door sedan (Australia)

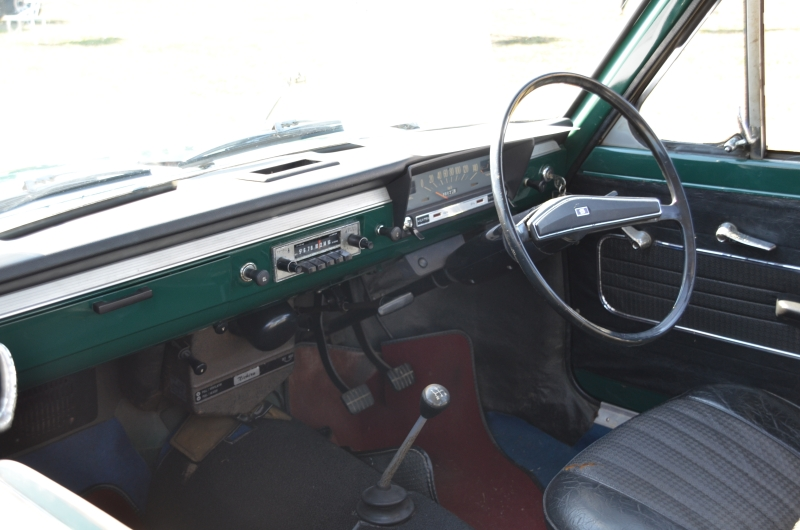
Sunny (B10) interior

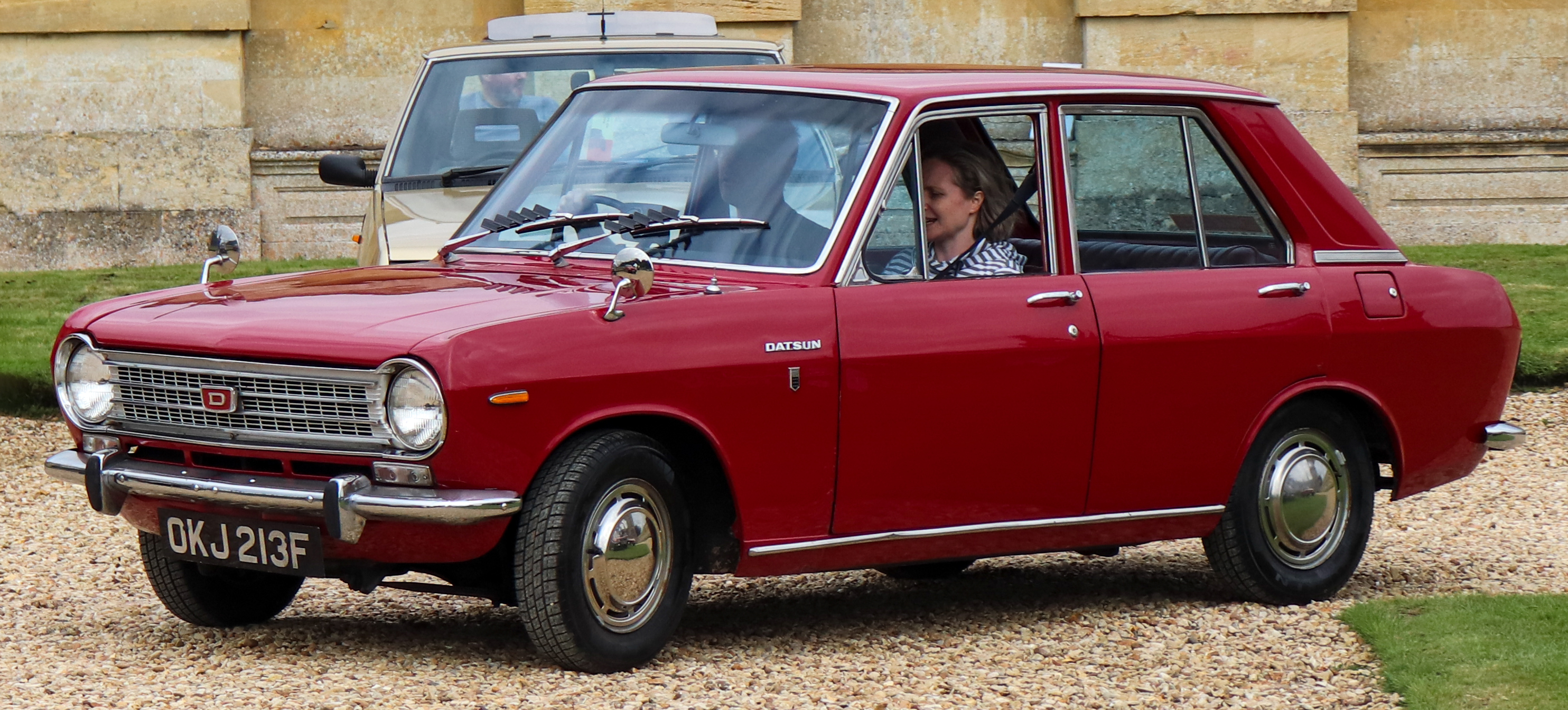
1968 Datsun 1000 DeLuxe four-door sedan (UK)

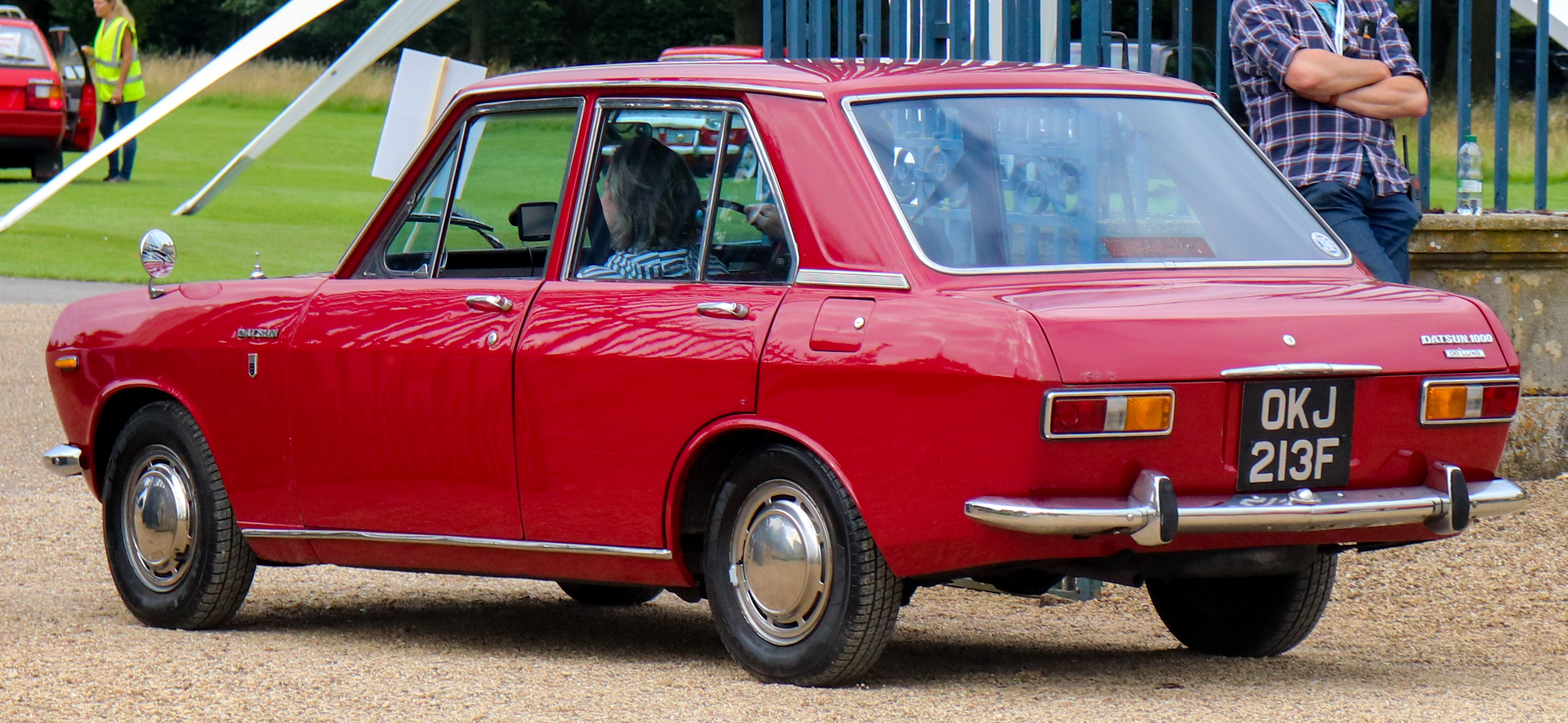
Four-door sedan, rear view (UK)

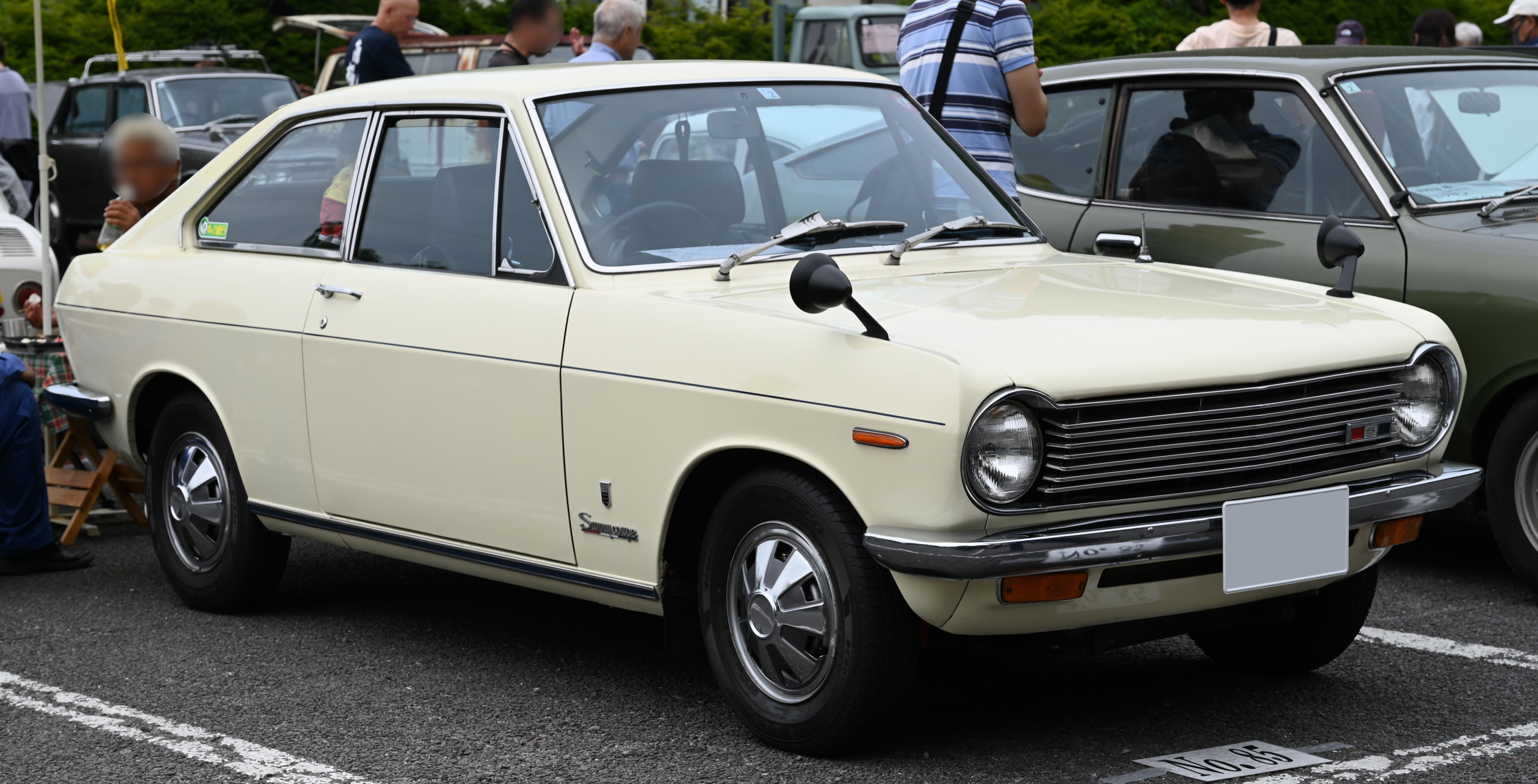
B10 Sunny coupé

=== B20 series (Sunny Truck) ===
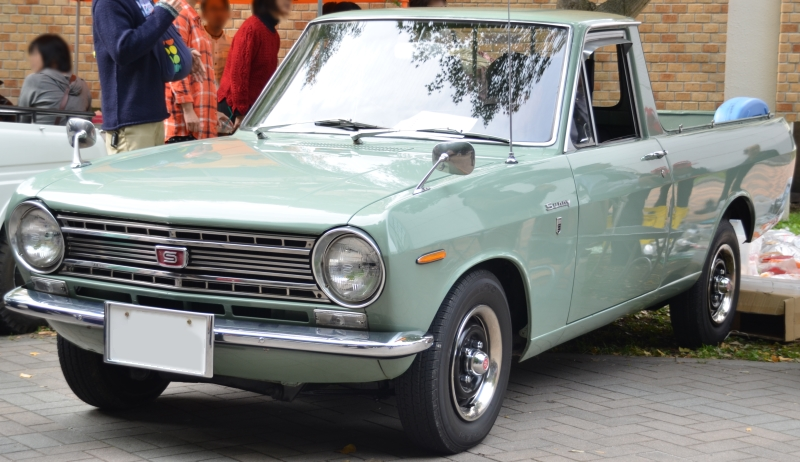
Datsun Sunny truck (B20)

The Datsun Sunny truck debuted in February 1967 and was the light commercial truck variation of the B10 passenger models. It was based on the VB10 van chassis, and is a body style which is sometimes referred to as a "coupé utility", as the bed is not separate from the passenger area. The introduction of a pickup truck based on the Sunny gave Nissan Saito Store and Nissan Cherry Store Japanese dealerships the opportunity to sell a commercial vehicle that was originally only offered at Nissan Store. The 520 series Datsun Truck shared its platform with the Datsun Bluebird, plus the larger Nissan Junior sharing an engine with the Nissan Cedric; Nissan decided to duplicate the success it had with a Bluebird-based pickup truck for the new Sunny platform. The Sunny was engineered by newly acquired Aichi Machine Industry Co., Ltd., and gave the new acquisition the ability to demonstrate their profitability to their new Nissan owners. The Sunny truck dimensions were in compliance with Japanese Government dimension regulations and the small displacement engines reduced the annual road tax obligation. The B20 used the same wheelbase and running gear as does the Datsun Sunny VB10 van, and shared its dimensions.

== Second generation (B110; 1970) ==
B110
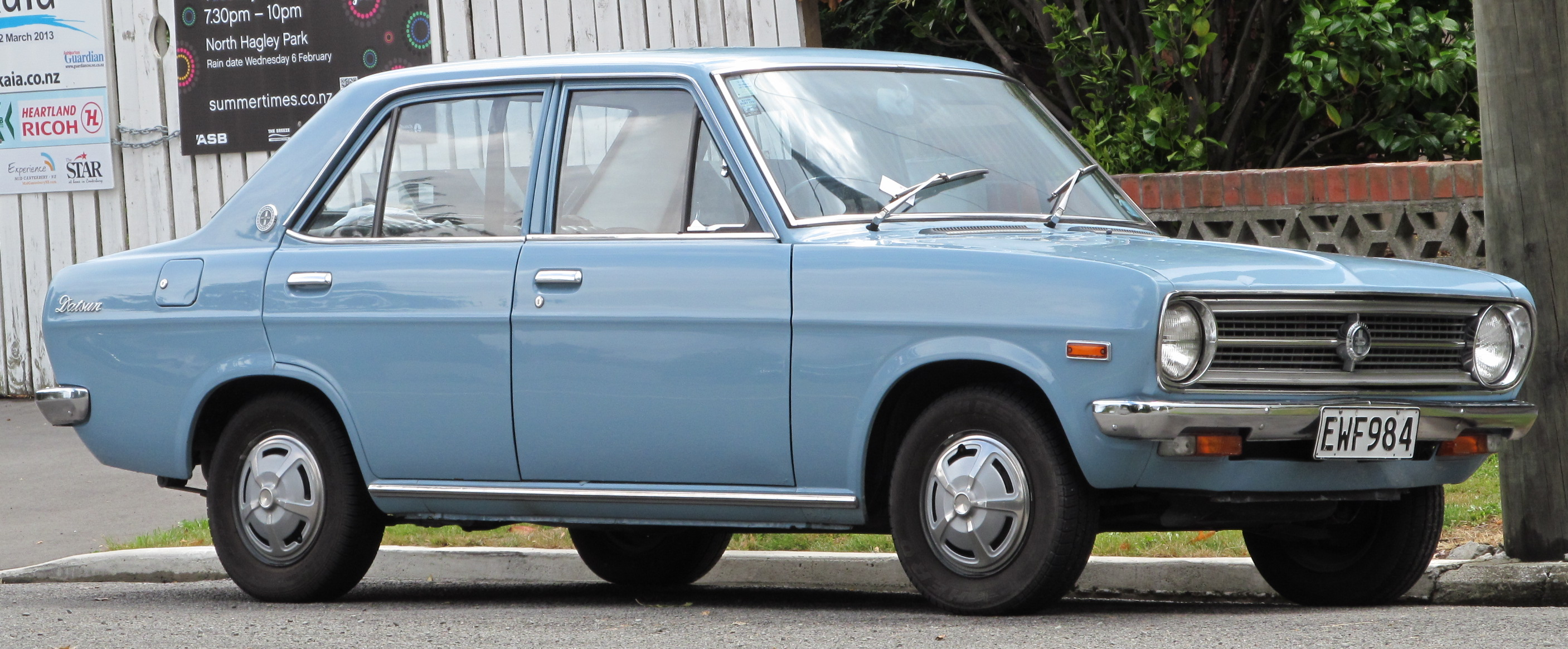
- 1971 Datsun 1200 4-door sedan (New Zealand)

Overview
- Also called: Datsun 1200; Datsun Finn (Finland)
- Production: 1970–1973; 1971–1989 (Sunny Truck)
- Assembly: Japan: Zama, Kanagawa (Zama Plant); Australia: Clayton, Victoria (Nissan Australia); New Zealand: Thames (CMI); New Zealand: Waitara (Motor Holdings); Portugal (Entreposto Comercial)

Body and chassis
- Class: Subcompact
- Body style: 2/4-door sedan; 3/5-door wagon/van; 2-door coupé
- Layout: FR layout

Powertrain
- Engine: 1.2 L A12 OHV I4; 1.4 L L14 SOHC I4
- Transmission: 3/4/5-speed manual; 3-speed automatic

Dimensions
- Wheelbase: 2,300 mm (90.6 in); 2,340 mm (92.1 in) (PB110); 2,530 mm (99.6 in) (GB120/122)
- Length: 3,830 mm (150.8 in)
- Width: 1,495 mm (58.9 in)
- Height: 1,390 mm (54.7 in)
- Curb weight: 700 kg (1,543 lb)

The second-generation Nissan Sunny (B110) was launched in January 1970 and was known as the Datsun 1200 in export markets. This new model was slightly larger in all dimensions to match its market rival, the equally popular Toyota Corolla. The two companies continued a game of one-upmanship which had started when Toyota gave the Corolla an 1,100 cc engine and prominently featured the additional displacement over its Sunny rival. Predictably, Nissan responded by giving the second generation Sunny a 1,200 cc engine and a somewhat controversial marketing campaign with the theme "the car next to me looks small."

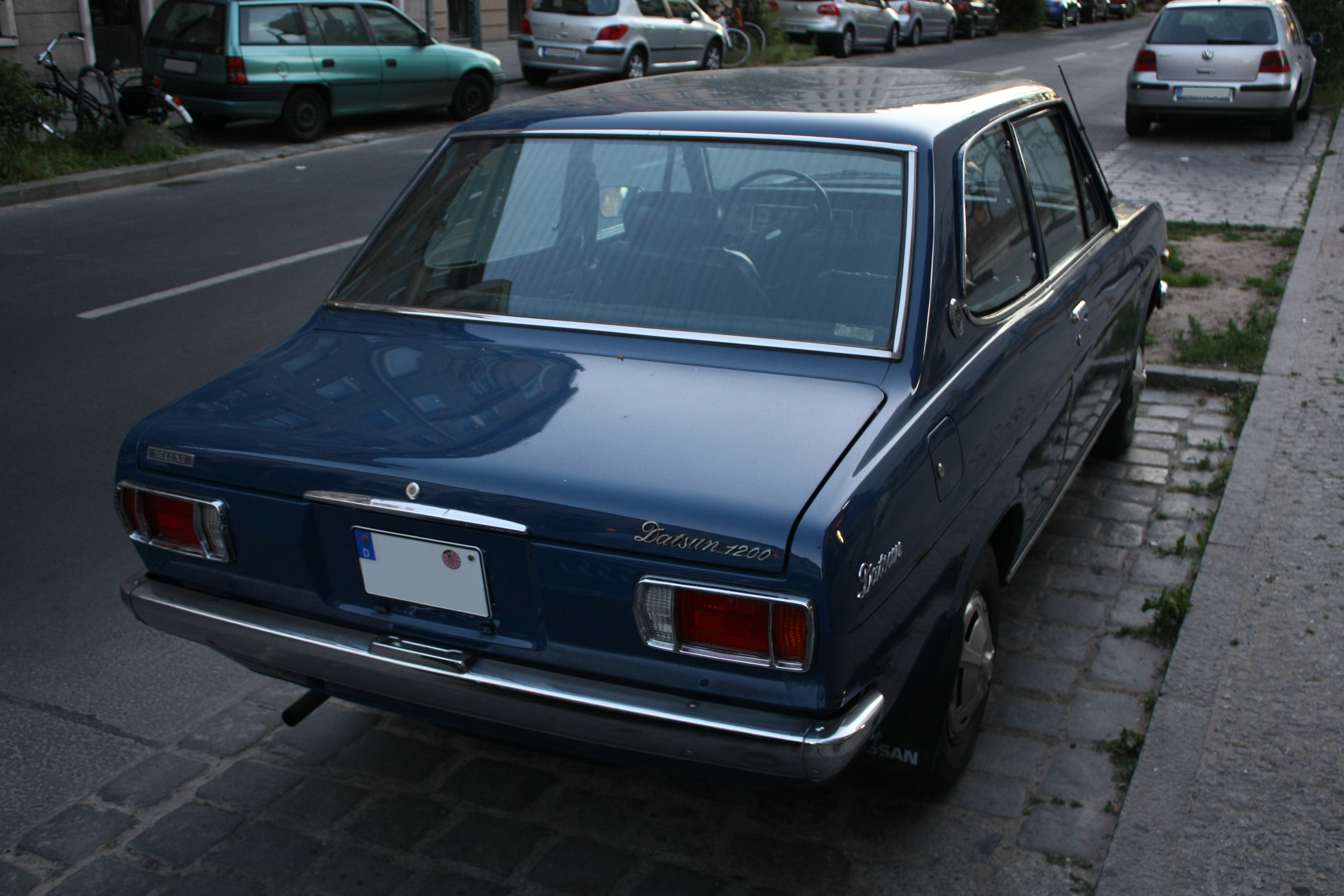
Datsun 1200 2-door sedan (Europe)

The Datsun 1200 featured MacPherson strut front suspension with optional disc brakes and an economical 1.2-litre A12-series engine, an enlarged version of the A10 used in the B10-series Sunny. A five-door station wagon was added to the Sunny range in addition to the three-door wagon. In April 1970 a GX (Grand Luxury) trim with twin-carburetor engine was added for the Japanese market. In January 1972 a minor facelift occurred in the Japanese market with a new hood, grille and other small modifications and equipment fitting. In August 1972 the GX-5 model was added in Japan, which improved on the GX by fitting a direct-fifth (non-overdrive) five-speed manual transmission. The Sunny Coupé 1200GX was offered as an alternative to the Toyota Corolla Levin and Toyota Sprinter Trueno, which were performance package trim levels on the more economical Corolla and Sprinter models. For the 1973 model year, US models were re-specified with energy-absorbing bumpers, fire-resistant interiors and other government-mandated safety items.

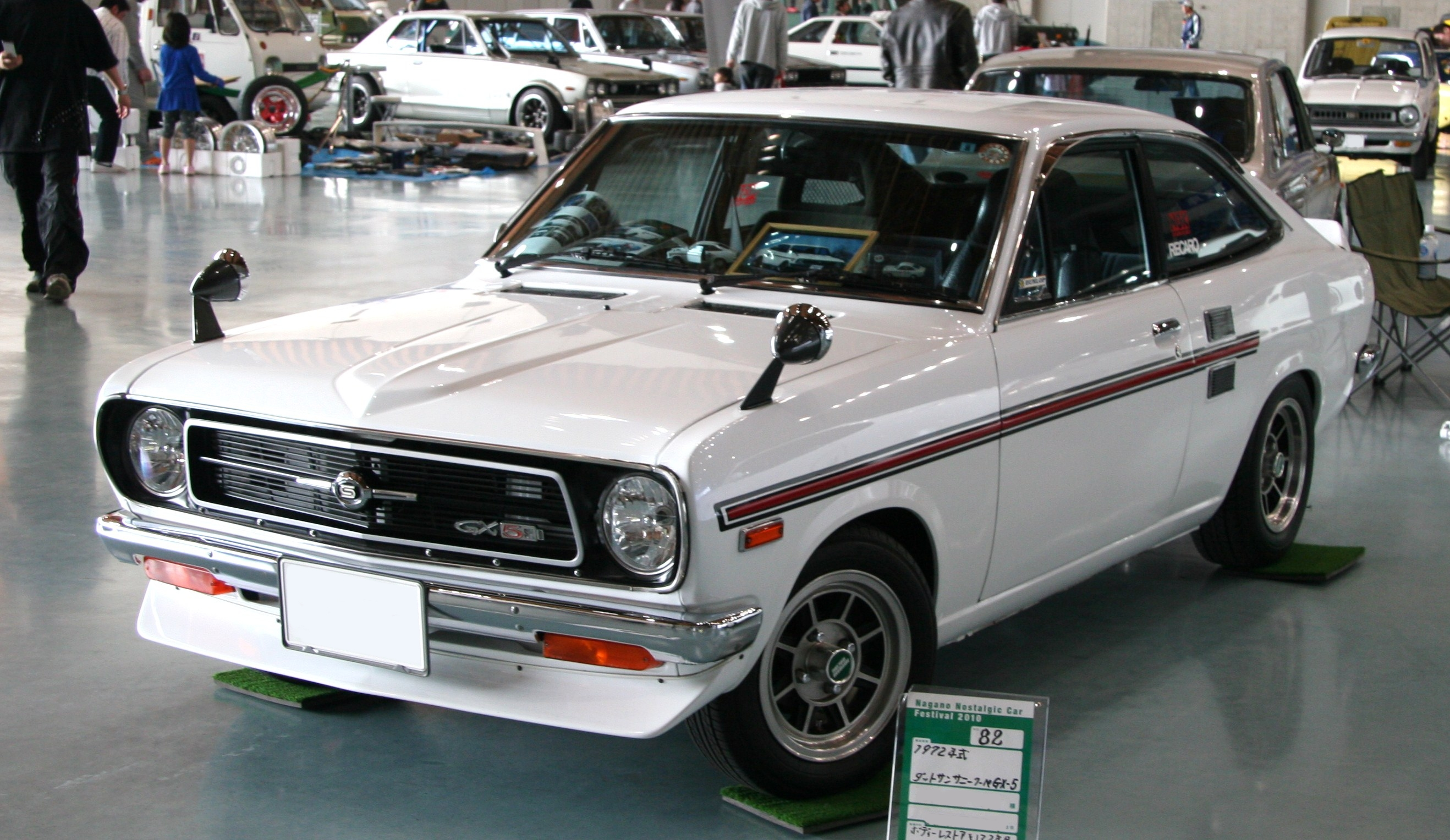
Nissan Sunny Coupé 1200 GX-5 (B110)

The B110 made its racing debut at the Fuji 200-mile race on 23 November 1970 in the TS1300 class, a class dominated by the Toyota Corolla; only one works Nissan challenged Toyota yielding a victory for driver Makoto Suzuki.

In Australia and New Zealand, the Datsun 1200 was highly regarded for its effectiveness as a rally car. The Datsun 1600 generally rated highest among entry-level Datsuns, and the 1200 a close second. The 1200 also took road racing victories, such as winning Class A (for cars costing less than AU$1960) at the 1970 Bathurst 500.

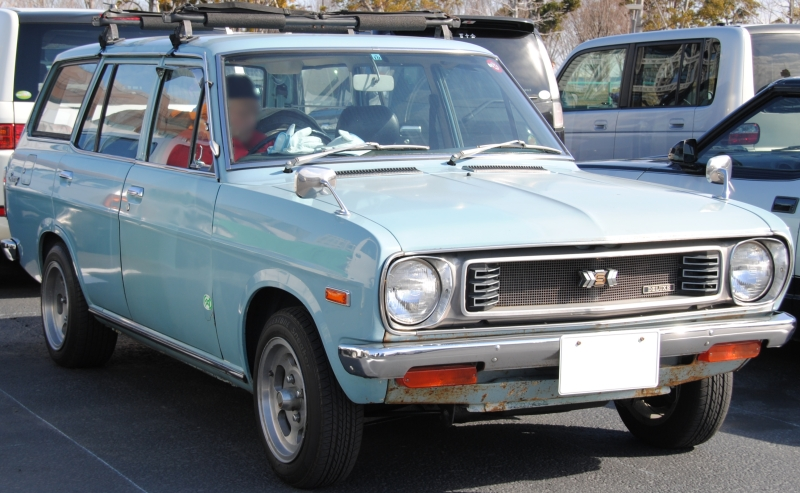
Nissan Sunny Van Deluxe (B110, Japan)

In South Africa, the B110 was sold through 1976. A pick up derivative, featuring a 1400 cc engine, was sold until 2008 when emissions laws forced the end of its production. Over 275,000 were sold to customers who appreciated the rugged rear-wheel-drive design.

In New Zealand, a special edition Datsun 1200 SSS four-door sedan with twin side-draft Dell'Orto 40 mm carburetors, different camshaft, 5-slot aluminium wheels and cosmetic changes in both exterior and interior, it was assembled and marketed locally, about 800 were made. The 1200 was popular in New Zealand, where it was contract-assembled at a two factories (sedans at Campbell Industries in Thames; three-door wagons at Motor Holdings, Waitara). A small number of Deluxe sedans and more numerous coupes were imported from Japan. The car remained in NZ production well into 1974 as Nissan NZ was unsure how the public would react to the oddly styled 120Y successor.

=== Europe ===
In the UK the Datsun 1200 was the first Japanese car to sell in large numbers, being the company's best seller there when its sales soared from just over 6,000 cars in 1971 to more than 30,000 a year later. The 120Y model, launched there in the autumn of 1973, helped take the brand from strength to strength, as did the smaller Cherry models. It was well equipped for its price with disc brakes and reclining front seats. This model established Datsun as the top Japanese exporter of cars to the United Kingdom.

In Portugal, Entreposto Comercial assembled the 1200 locally from 1972 until 1974. It was very successful in the Portuguese market, and dominated the local racing and rally scene. The 1200 was so popular in competition that a single-car racing series, the Troféu Datsun 1200 ("Datsun 1200 Trophy"), was instituted and ran for several years. To capitalize on its competition success, a sporty Datsun 1200 S1 two-door sedan was also derived by Nissan's local affiliate. The S1 made use of the free-flow exhaust from the Troféu cars, a modified camshaft, increased compression ratio, modified valves with double springs, polished cylinder head and manifold headers, and double carburetors. Power increased from the 68 hp (50 kW) of the standard car to 75 hp (55 kW). Cosmetically, it received side stripes, wider wheels and tires, a sports steering wheel by De Moura, and a centre console with additional instrumentation.

=== North America ===
In North America (US and Canada), over 133,000 Datsun 1200s were sold in the three model years they were available, 1971 through 1973. Coupé total sales were 89,541 and two-door sedan total sales were 43,761. The New York Yankees used a Datsun 1200 as a bullpen car in the 1970s.

The Datsun 1200 was rated the most fuel-efficient vehicle in the United States by the Environmental Protection Agency (EPA) in 1973, in overall driving pattern. as rated by the government at 28.7 mpg_{‑US} (8.2 L/100 km; 34.5 mpg_{‑imp}) The Sunny, however, was only rated the most fuel efficient as the EPA had not yet tested the Honda Civic. At its United States introduction, it had 69 hp (51 kW) and 70 lb⋅ft (95 N⋅m) of torque. These values dropped in 1972 as various power-sapping anti-smog measures were introduced.

=== PB110 series Coupé ===
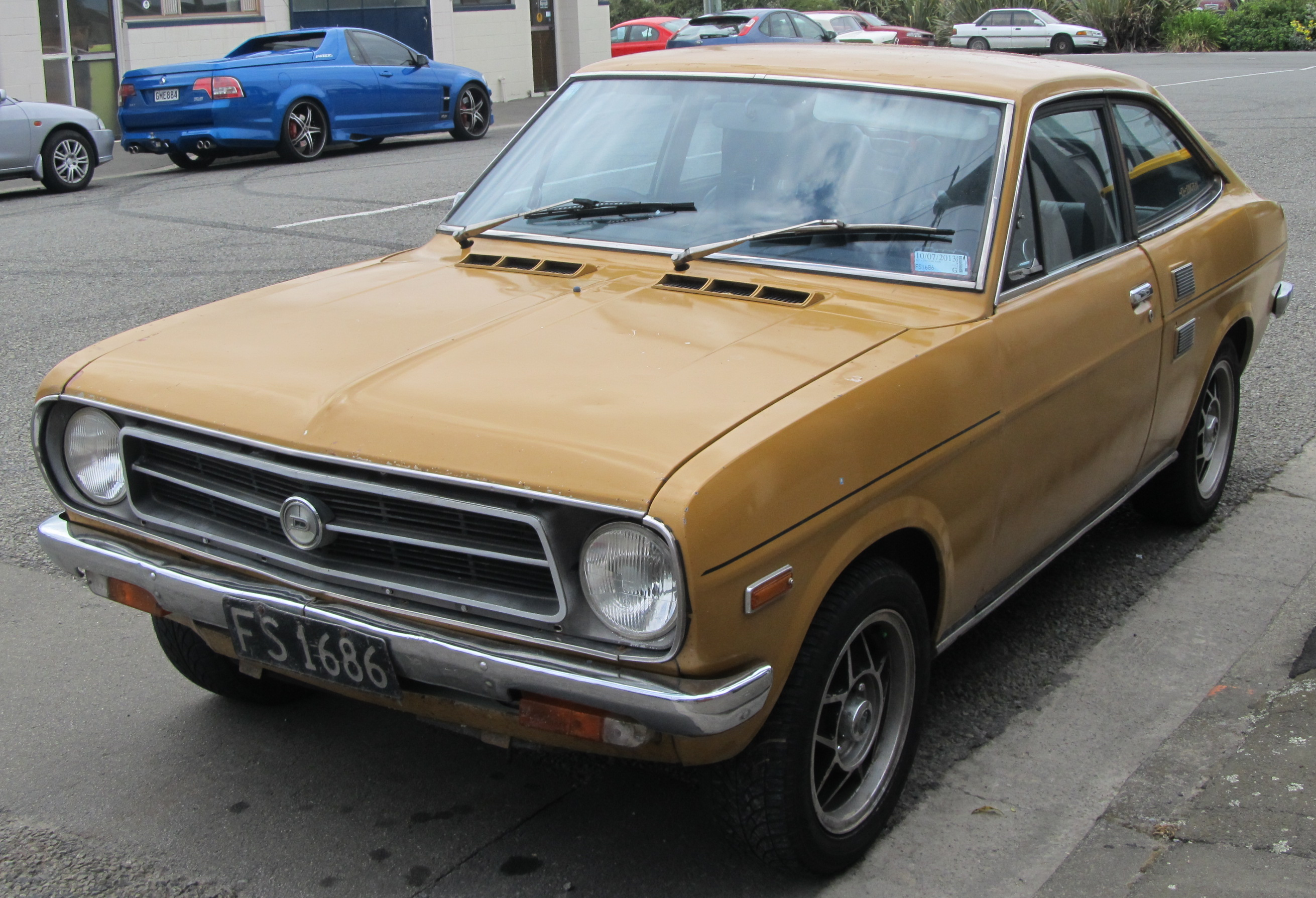
Datsun 1200 coupé, B110 (with aftermarket wheels)

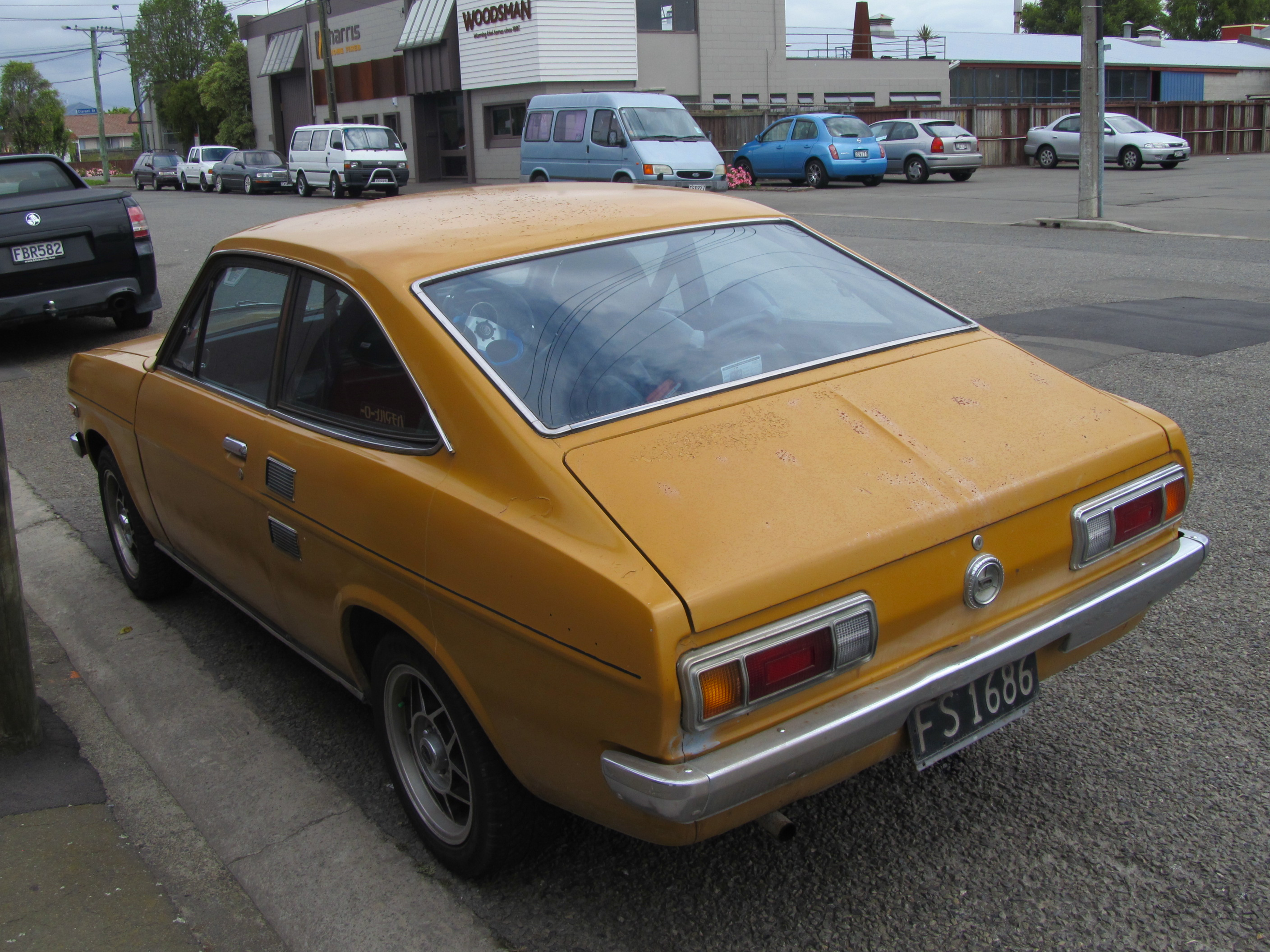
Datsun 1200 coupé, B110 (with aftermarket wheels)

In April 1971, halfway through the model year, the Sunny Excellent (PB110 series) coupé debuted for the Japanese market. It was based on the B110, but with new hood, fenders and grille, and featured a SOHC 1.4-litre Nissan L engine. The front overhang was extended 130 mm (5.1 in) to accommodate the larger P510 type radiator and the wheelbase by 40 mm (1.6 in). The engine position was retained in the same position as the original A-series engine which further assisted the handling even though the engine was heavier. No changes were necessary to the firewall. The PB110 was offered in both GL (single carburetor) and GX models (twin carburetor). The larger PB110 was generally not exported.

At the Tokyo Motor Show, 19 October 1972, a Sunny Excellent with Nissan's two-rotor Wankel rotary engine was exhibited, but never entered production. Wheels magazine drove this car on the race track.

=== B120 series (Sunny Truck) ===
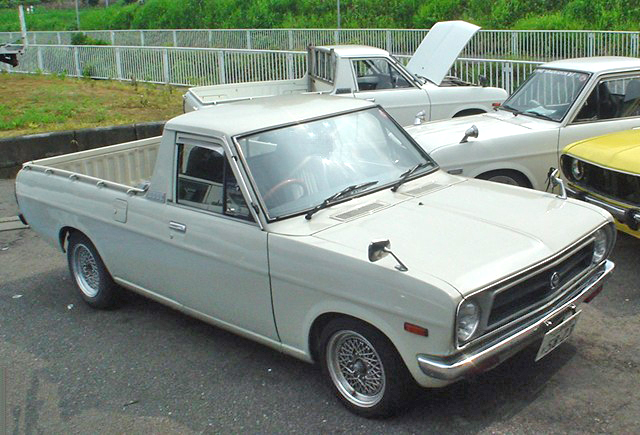
Nissan GB121 Sunny Truck

The B120 commercial truck debuted in February 1971, based on the B110 passenger car chassis. The B120 used the same wheelbase and running gear of the Datsun 1200 sedans, coupé and wagon models. Initially it used the same stainless steel grille as the 1200 sedan, and the rectangular gauges of the Standard model B110s. Both regular (B120) and long-bed (GB120) models were offered. After the 1200 car series ceased production the B120 continued. In certain markets such as South Africa, the B120 was actually badged as the "120Y" and sold as part of the updated 120Y range. It was assembled locally and marketed in New Zealand during the 1980s in two trims: "RoadStar" and "SportStar". It was capable of 49 mpg_{‑US} (4.8 L/100 km; 59 mpg_{‑imp}). B120s were not sold in North America, partly due to the US "Chicken Tax" and partly because perceptions of vehicle size meant that the 620/720 series were considered small pickups.

In 1978, in the Japanese market, the B121 model replaced the B120, with the most notable change being a switch to a plastic grille of the type used by the B110 coupé. Also notable was a change to upscale round instrumentation. The B120 was particularly successful in South Africa. In 1977, for instance, it was the most sold commercial vehicle of any type there. It continued in production there long into the 21st century. It received a very mild facelift in 1978, with a new grille and taillight treatment, as well as interior upgrades.

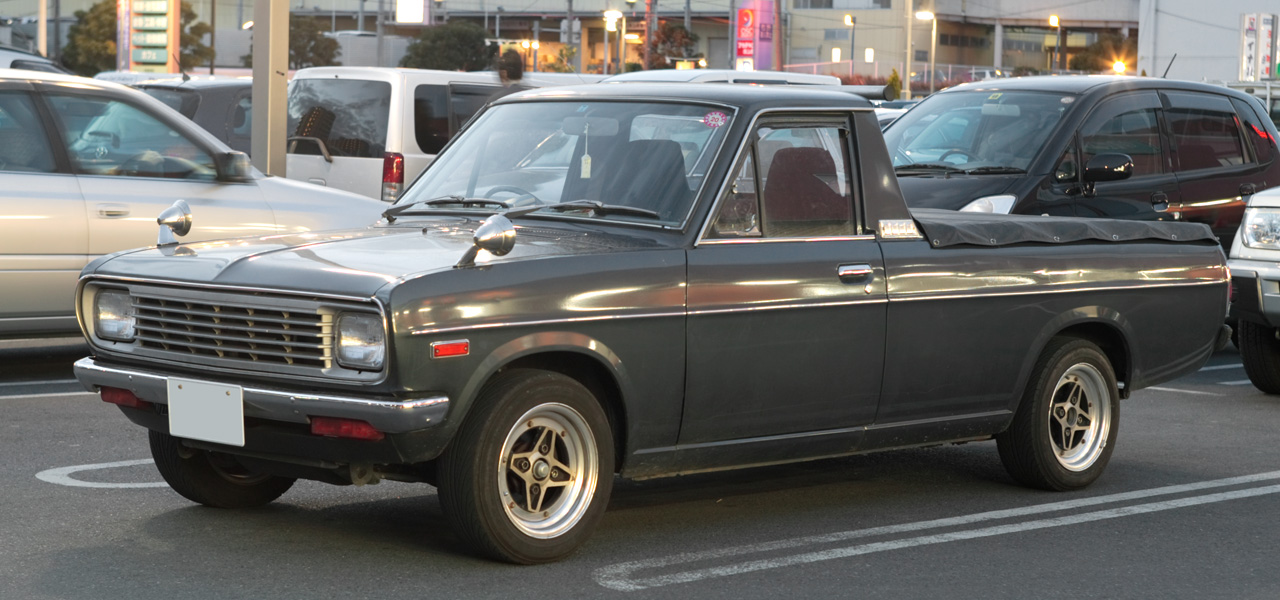
Nissan GB122 Sunny Truck

In November 1989, an updated B122 and GB122 (longbed) models replaced the B121. Prominent among changes was a switch from round headlights to rectangular ones (along with a new grille to accommodate this change). Other significant changes include:

- front disc brakes
- catalytic converters
- NO_{x} conforming (emission controlled) A12 engine were installed in the RB122 and RGB122 models.

=== B140 series (Bakkie) ===
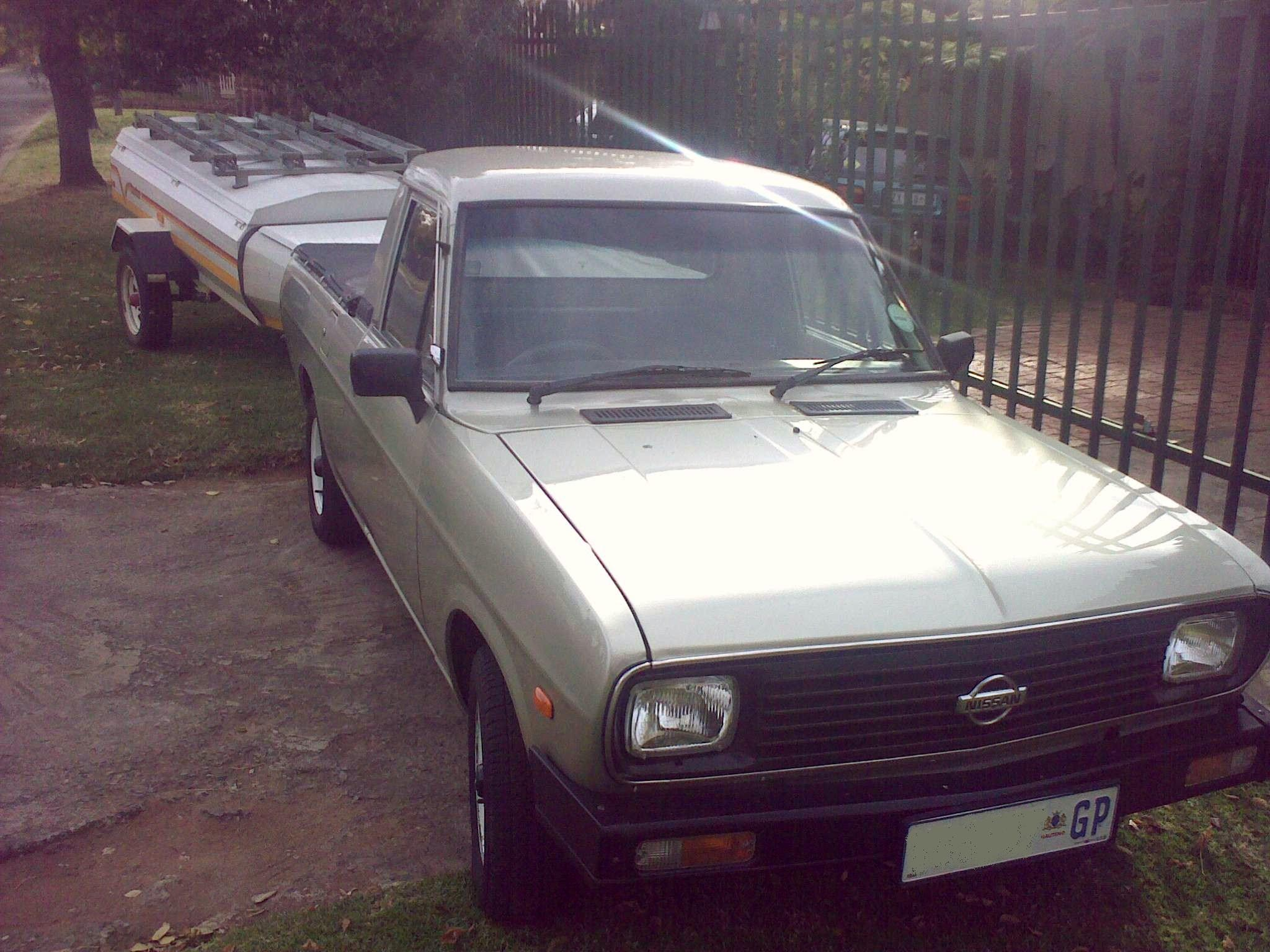
Nissan 1400 B140 Bakkie

The Sunny Truck was sold in South Africa for a total of 37 years after having been launched there in 1971. The B140 variation, with 1.4-litre A14 engine, was manufactured up until 2008 by Nissan South Africa as the Nissan LDV 1400 (Light Delivery Vehicle). The 1400 Bakkie saw many changes in its long career. The main ones were a five-speed manual gearbox, power assisted disc brakes, and a roof height extension to accommodate taller South Africans. The 1400 Bakkie was replaced late in 2008 by the NP200, a rebadged Dacia Logan Pick-Up. A major departure for the Nissan bakkie is that the new model is front-wheel drive (FWD), whereas the original was rear-wheel drive (RWD) – a major selling point of the vehicle in South Africa where it was the only RWD bakkie in its class for many years. A long-standing marketing credo was "put the power where the load is".

== Third generation (B210; 1973) ==
B210
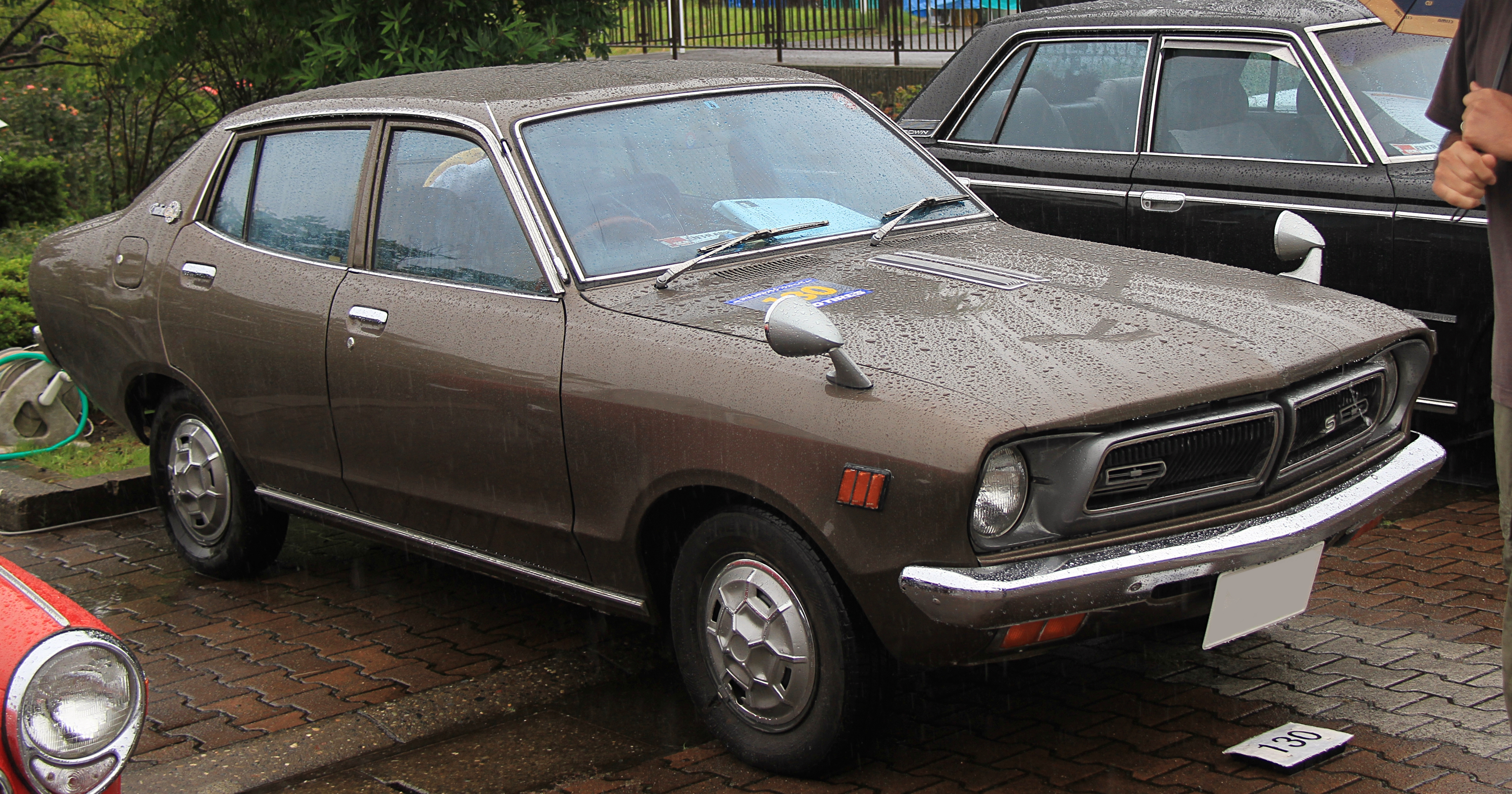
- Datsun Sunny Excellent sedan 1.4GL (PB210)

Overview
- Also called: Datsun B210; Datsun 120Y/140Y; Datsun Sunny; Yue Loong 301
- Production: May 1973–1977
- Assembly: Japan: Zama Plant, Zama, Kanagawa; Australia: Clayton, Victoria (Nissan Australia); New Zealand: Thames (Campbell Industries); Porirua (Todd Motors); South Africa: Rosslyn (NSA)

Body and chassis
- Class: Subcompact
- Body style: 3-door coupé; 2/4-door sedan; 3/5-door wagon; 3-door panel van
- Layout: FR layout
- Related: Nissan Silvia S10

Powertrain
- Engine: 1171 cc A12 OHV I4 (B210); 1288 cc A13 OHV I4; 1397 cc A14 OHV I4; 1428 cc L14 I4 (PB210); 1595 cc L16 I4 (GB211); 1595 cc L16T I4 (ZA only)
- Transmission: 3/4/5-speed manual; 3-speed automatic

Dimensions
- Wheelbase: 2,340 mm (92.1 in)
- Length: 3,950 mm (155.5 in); 3,985 mm (156.9 in) (Wagon/Van); 4,045 mm (159.3 in) (Excellent); 4,080 mm (160.6 in) (with US bumpers)
- Width: 1,545 mm (60.8 in)
- Height: 1,360 mm (53.5 in)
- Curb weight: 907 kg (2,000 lb)

Exported as the Datsun 120Y and Datsun B210 (in North America), the third generation (1973–1978) Sunny was popular as it debuted during the 1973 oil crisis. It was first shown on 1 May 1973 in Japan, as the 1.2 or the 1.4-litre Excellent. Both engines were offered in two different levels of output, from the lowest powered 68 PS (50 kW) 1.2 to the 95 PS (70 kW) Excellent GX Coupé. Six body styles were offered: the four-door sedan, two-door sedan, two-door fastback, three-door wagon, five-door wagon, and a three-door van. The coupé retained its fastback styling, but now featured a full hatchback door rather than the small trunk lid of the previous generation Sunny. The wagon and van were not offered in North America. In 1975, Japan models were fitted with emission control technology, called Nissan NAPS to be in compliance with Japanese Government emission control regulations enforced that year.

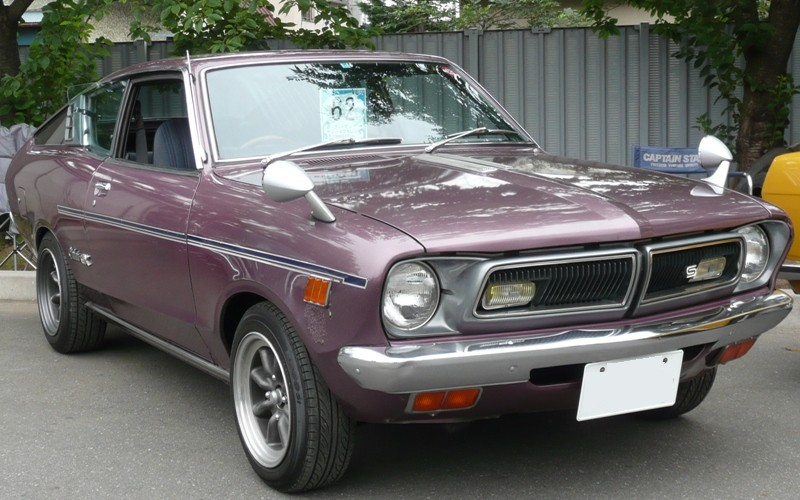
Nissan Sunny Excellent GX 1400 coupé (KPB210, Japan)

The related Sunny Excellents continued until 1976 as PB210 models, at first fitted with a 1.4-litre L14 engine. American market B210s were the first Sunnys to have the larger 5 mph (8 km/h) collision bumpers, due to the US's safety standards at the time. Other markets continued with the more tightly fitted chrome bumpers. In most markets, the B210 line featured as the only engine option a re-designed A12 engine. As usual for Japan, the wagon (three- and five-door models alike) was marketed as a van for commercial use, where it was only available with the lowest-powered 1.2 engine (VB210). The van, in its lowest standard equipment level, came equipped with a three-speed manual gearbox with a column-mounted shift lever.

This chassis formed the basis for the S10 underpinning the Nissan Silvia coupé, which allowed Nissan to sell the Sunny Coupé at two Nissan Japanese dealership networks. The Sunny was exclusive to Nissan Satio Store, while the Silvia was exclusive to Nissan Prince Store, alongside the Nissan Skyline.

=== Facelift (B211) ===
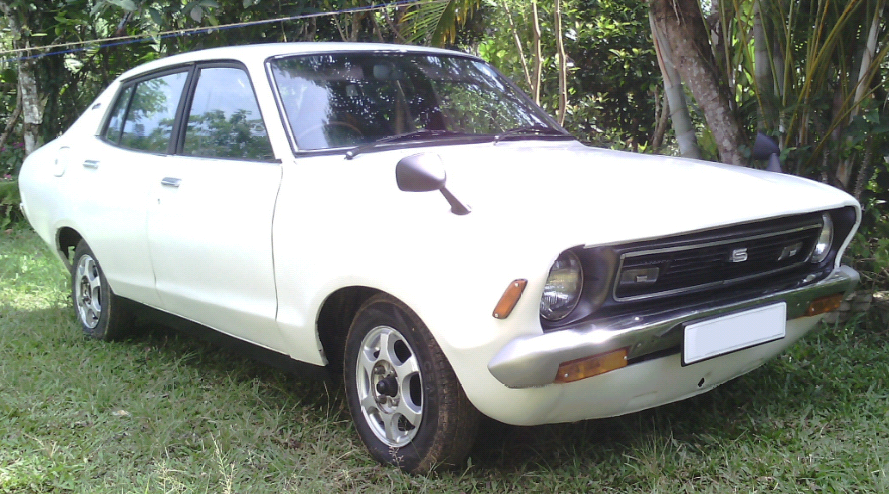
Nissan Sunny GL (B211, Japan)

B211 is the chassis code for the minor facelift of the B210, introduced in February 1976. It included a changed grille and other minor changes, such as new wing mirrors and hubcaps. The most important differences were under the hood, where the engines had been upgraded to meet Japan's 1976 emissions standards. The Sunny Excellent now only came fitted with the larger 1.6-litre engine, with the more compact A14 engine replacing the L14 and being installed in the regular bodied model (HB211). The Excellent's chassis code changed from PB210 to GB211 and was now considered a trim-level option for the regular B211 rather than as a separate model. Although regular production in Japan as well as sales in most countries ended in late 1977 for the 1978 model year, the B210 series continued to be produced by Nissan South Africa through 1980. The van models were not replaced until later.

=== Export markets ===
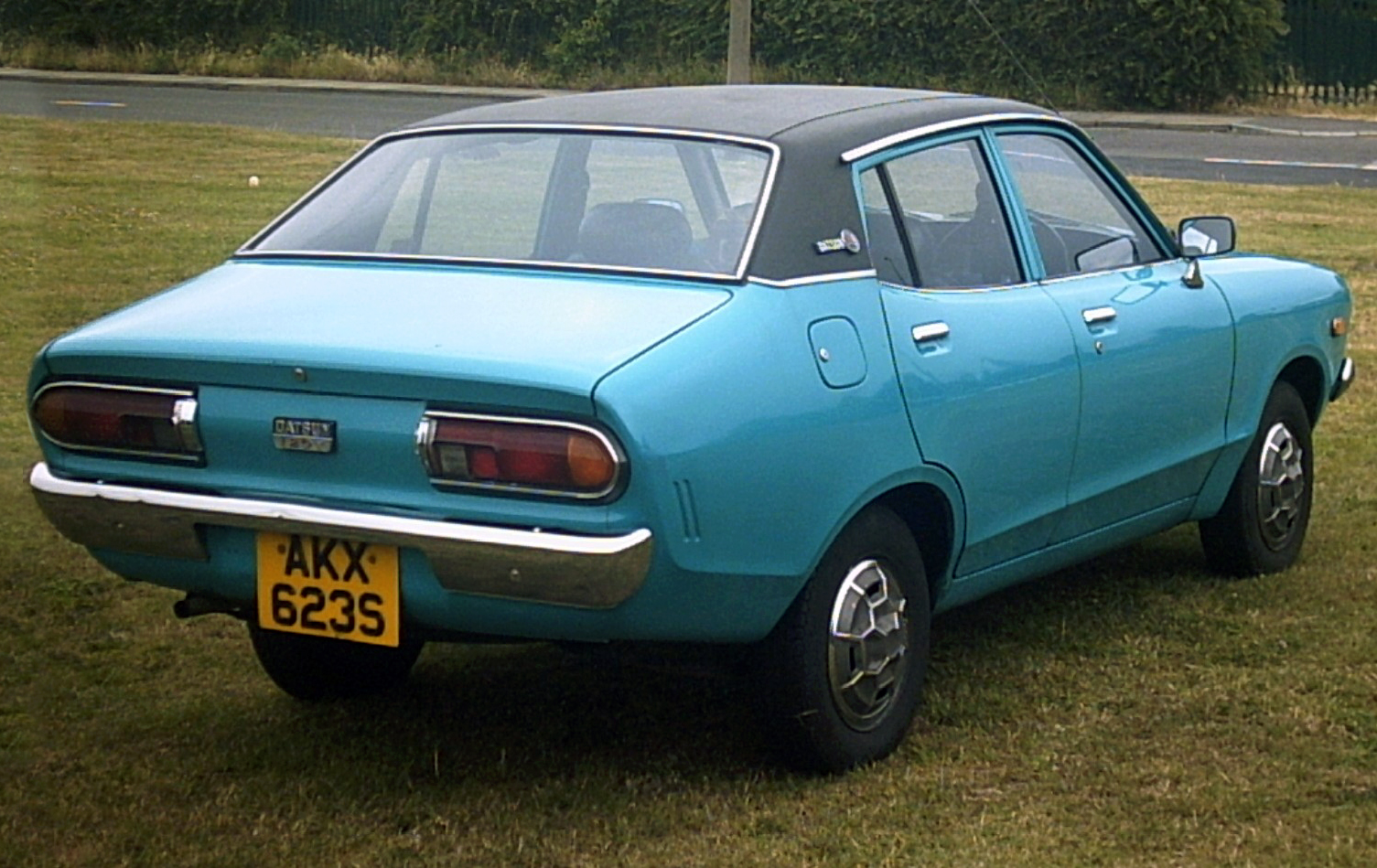
Datsun 120Y (B210) saloon (UK)

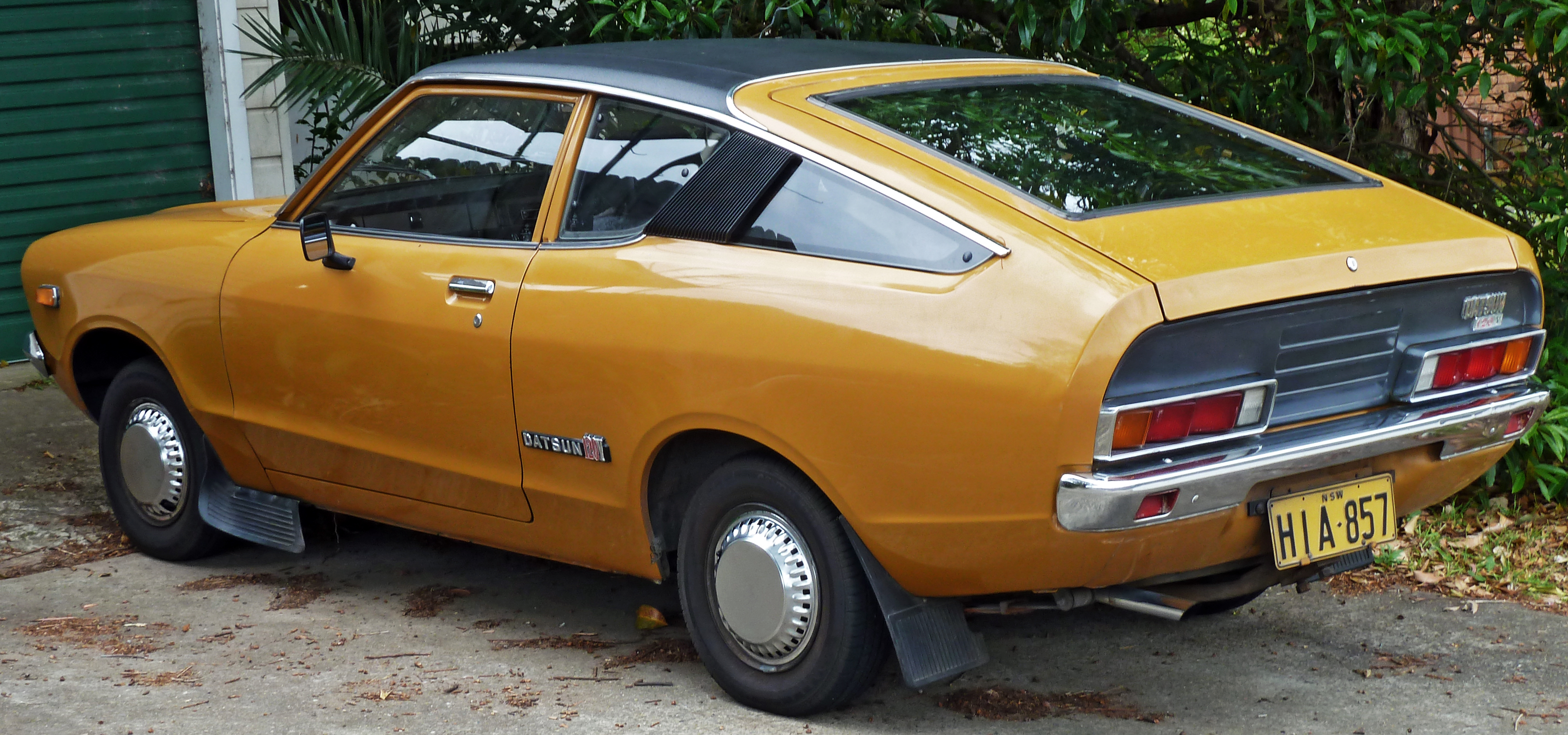
1974 Datsun 120Y (B210) coupé (Australia)

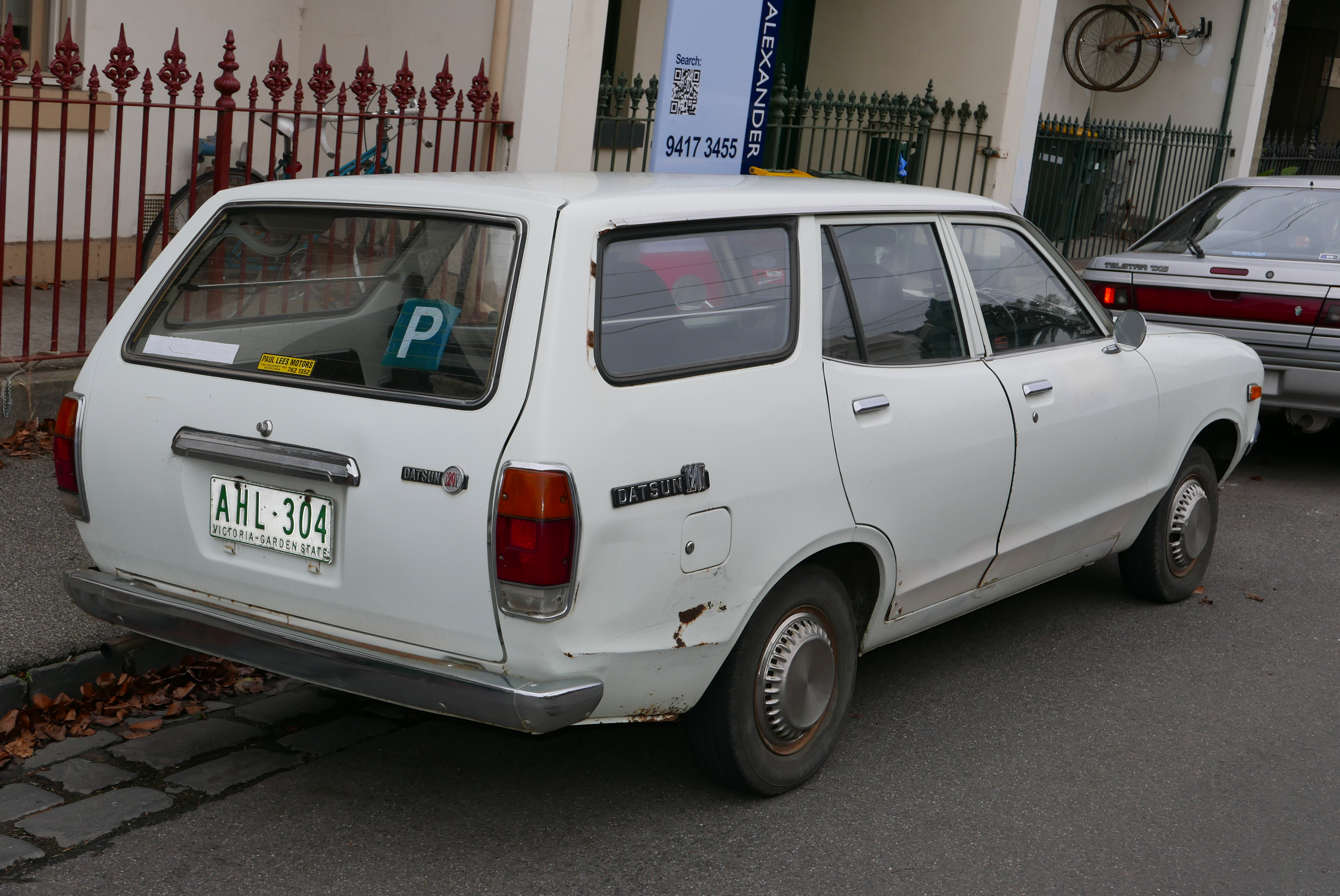
1978 Datsun 120Y (B210) wagon (Australia)

==== North America ====
The Datsun B210 continued to be the fuel-economy leader in North America and it was one of the least expensive cars available. This was in part due to the light metal; small A13 or A14 engine with OHV technology and a very basic vinyl interior used in its construction. Introduced for 1974 with a 1.3-litre four, this was replaced by a larger and more powerful 1.4-litre version for 1975. This engine remained in use, continuing to be installed in the next generation B210. In 1978, a special edition called the B210GX was produced. It contained special features, such as a unique steering wheel and stripe decals. At the time, their body styles were popular with buyers – mainly the hatchback coupé as the sedans were considered by some to be less appealing. Datsun dealers were instructed to describe the coupé as having "the image of a Mini-Z-Car". The 1978 B210 (American model) with five-speed transmission was rated by the United States Environmental Protection Agency at 50 mpg_{‑US} (4.7 L/100 km; 60 mpg_{‑imp}) highway fuel economy.

Road & Track was somewhat critical of the B210 in their 1975 test. They criticized the "modest performance" of the "peppy" engine, but were impressed with its 27 mpg_{‑US} (8.7 L/100 km; 32 mpg_{‑imp}) fuel economy. B210 pricing started at US$2,849 that year. The "Datsun Honeybee" was a special edition sedan that had exclusive decals, but did not have equipment such as a radio or carpeting. Nonetheless, the Honeybee is now considered a collector's car among Datsun enthusiasts.

US-market models were fitted with these A-series engines (years given are model years):

- 1974: A13 engine, 1.3 L (1288 cc) OHV I4
- 1975–1978: A14 engine, 1.4 L (1397 cc) OHV I4. Power in 1975 was 70 or 68 hp (52 or 51 kW) (SAE Net) in 49-state versus California trim - the regular version took leaded fuel and depended on an EGR system for air cleaning, while the unleaded California cars have a catalytic converter. Gross horsepower ratings are 80 and 78 respectively.

A highly modified "ground effect" 120Y fastback coupé is the fastest Datsun/Nissan in the world. Tom Burkland's "411 To Bonneville" held the B/BFCC record at Bonneville from August 1985 to August 2011 with a speed of 294.868 mph (474.544 km/h). SCTA records

==== Oceania ====
Despite earlier misgivings, the 120Y, when finally launched in New Zealand in 1974, proved popular with Nissan NZ. It eventually assembled some cars in a temporary CKD plant in the Auckland suburb of Mount Roskill, before the new plant in Wiri was completed later in the decade. Four-door sedans and three-and five-door wagons were built locally and were supplemented by some coupés imported built-up from Japan.

The 120Y was assembled from kits in Melbourne, Australia and boasted disc brakes (although not power assisted), alternator, 4 speed gearbox, radial tyres, radio and mud flaps as standard, most of which were options on other makes. The modest performance and strictly conventional design were offset by excellent fuel economy and a better standard of build. The 120Y was sharply criticized by magazines such as Wheels of Australia, which felt that it offered no true improvement on its predecessor. That was not surprising given that the B110 platform was carried over, but used a slightly revised A12 engine. Like some Nissans of this period, it was considered overstyled. In New Zealand and Australia there was also the "Datsun 120Y SSS" limited edition B210, which had minor aesthetic differences to the regular B210 and same engine upgrades as in B110 1200 SSS (twin carbs, camshaft).

==== South Africa ====
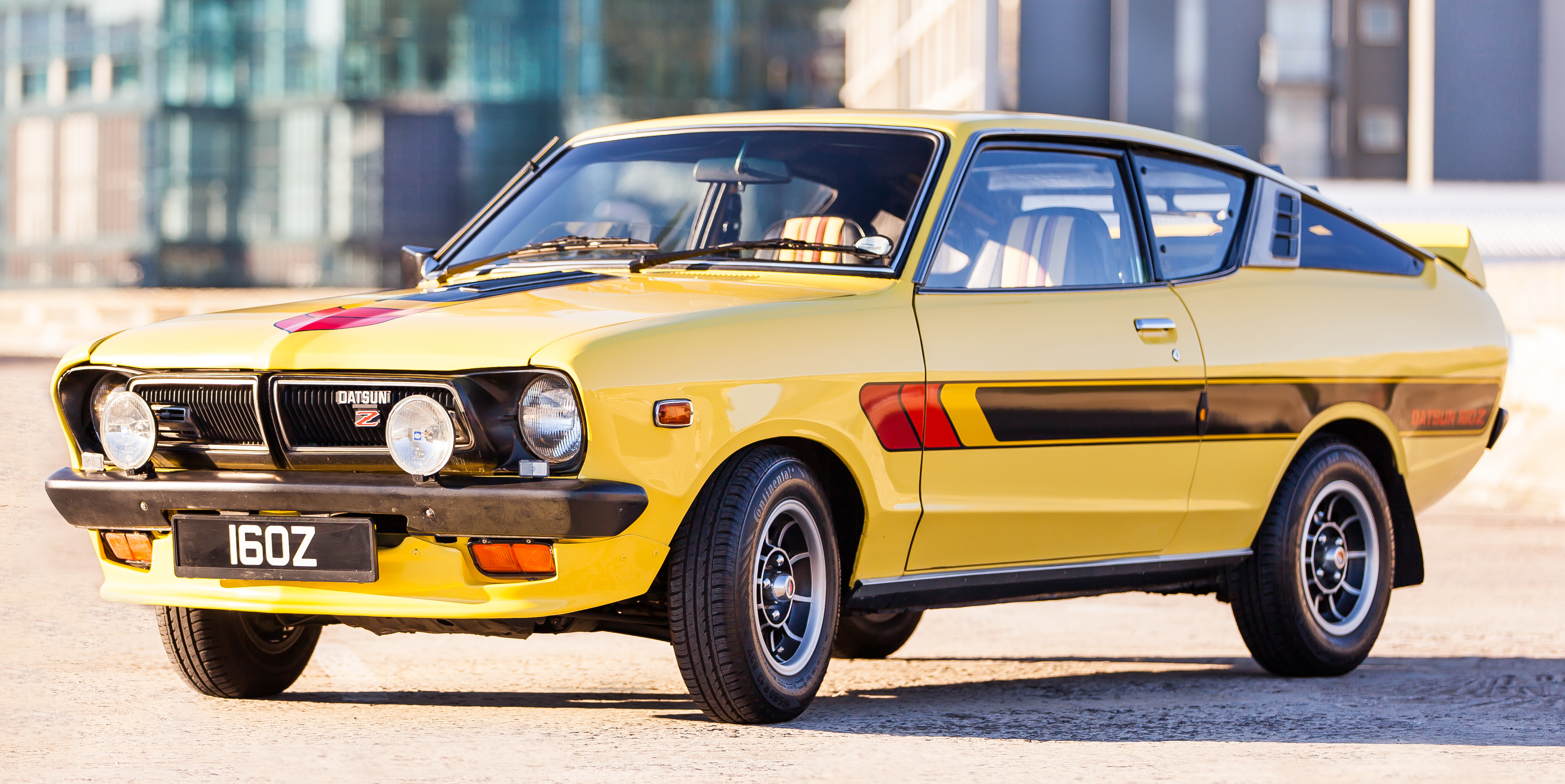
160Z Sports Coupé (B210), South Africa

In the South African market the B210 was assembled locally from December 1975 until 1983, replacing the previous "Datsun 1200". South African "Y-series" cars, as they were called locally, also featured L14 and L16 engine options, as well as two special editions of B210 coupé, badged as the 140Z and 160Z. The 140Z featured a high performance camshaft, freeflow exhaust and twin 40 mm Dell'orto carburettors, while the 160Z featured twin Hitachi (SU type) carburetors. Both had four-speed transmissions. The standard 120Y has the 1171 cc A12 engine as already used in the 1200, with 49 kW (67 PS; 66 hp) at 6000 rpm. The well-equipped 140Y GX had a 1428 cc 70 kW (95 PS; 94 hp) L14 motor and was also available as a two-door liftback coupé. The only other bodywork available at the time of introduction was a four-door sedan; later a four-door wagon joined the lineup. All South African Datsun Y's received the longer Sunny Excellent front sheet-metal, allowing the fitting of the L14 engine. In October 1976, a version of the 140Y with a three-speed automatic transmission appeared, which had a 62 kW (84 PS; 83 hp) engine.

During 1978 the Y-series received a facelift, which mostly consisted of a retouched front grille. Datsun-Nissan South Africa also decided to fit the bigger L16 engine. This motor, now with DIN ratings, produced 57 kW (77 PS; 76 hp) in GX specifications and 70 kW (95 PS; 94 hp) in the 160Z. The 140Y sedan received the new A14 engine, while the 140Y station wagon retained the earlier L14 unit. The 160Z appeared in November 1978, with 120 cars built that year, and 121 built in 1979.

==== Europe ====
When introduced in the UK, the 120Y quickly gained popularity, further strengthening Datsun's position, helping it to gain second place amongst foreign imports. The car's popularity was helped by high equipment levels for a car of this size, while also being competitively priced as well as Datsun cars have a reputation for being reliable, while at the same time UK-manufactured cars were in short supply due to the regular strikes and stoppages affecting British car plants. British Leyland was particularly hard hit by these crises, while at the same time several of its model ranges were gaining a reputation for being unreliable and badly-built.

== Fourth generation (B310; 1977) ==
Datsun Sunny B310 Series
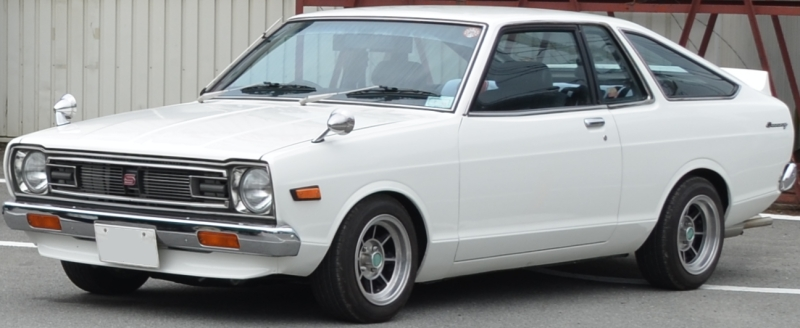
- 1977 Nissan Sunny Coupé

Overview
- Also called: Datsun Sunny; Datsun 210; Datsun 120Y/130Y/140Y/150Y; Yue Loong 302/303; Guangtong GTQ5011 (China; JV)
- Production: November 1977 – November 1981
- Assembly: Japan: Zama Plant, Zama, Kanagawa; Malaysia: Kuala Lumpur (Tan Chong)

Body and chassis
- Class: Subcompact
- Body style: 2/4-door sedan; 3-door coupé; 3/5-door wagon/van; 5-door wagon (fastback); 3-door panel van
- Layout: FR layout

Powertrain
- Engine: 1171 cc A12 I4 (B310); 1237 cc A12A I4 (B310); 1270 cc A13 I4 (GB310); 1397 cc A14 I4 (HB310); 1487 cc A15 I4 (PB310)
- Transmission: 4- or 5-speed manual; 3-speed automatic

Dimensions
- Wheelbase: 2,340 mm (92.1 in)
- Length: 3,940 mm (155.1 in)
- Width: 1,590 mm (62.6 in)
- Height: 1,365 mm (53.7 in)
- Curb weight: 2,000 lb (907 kg)

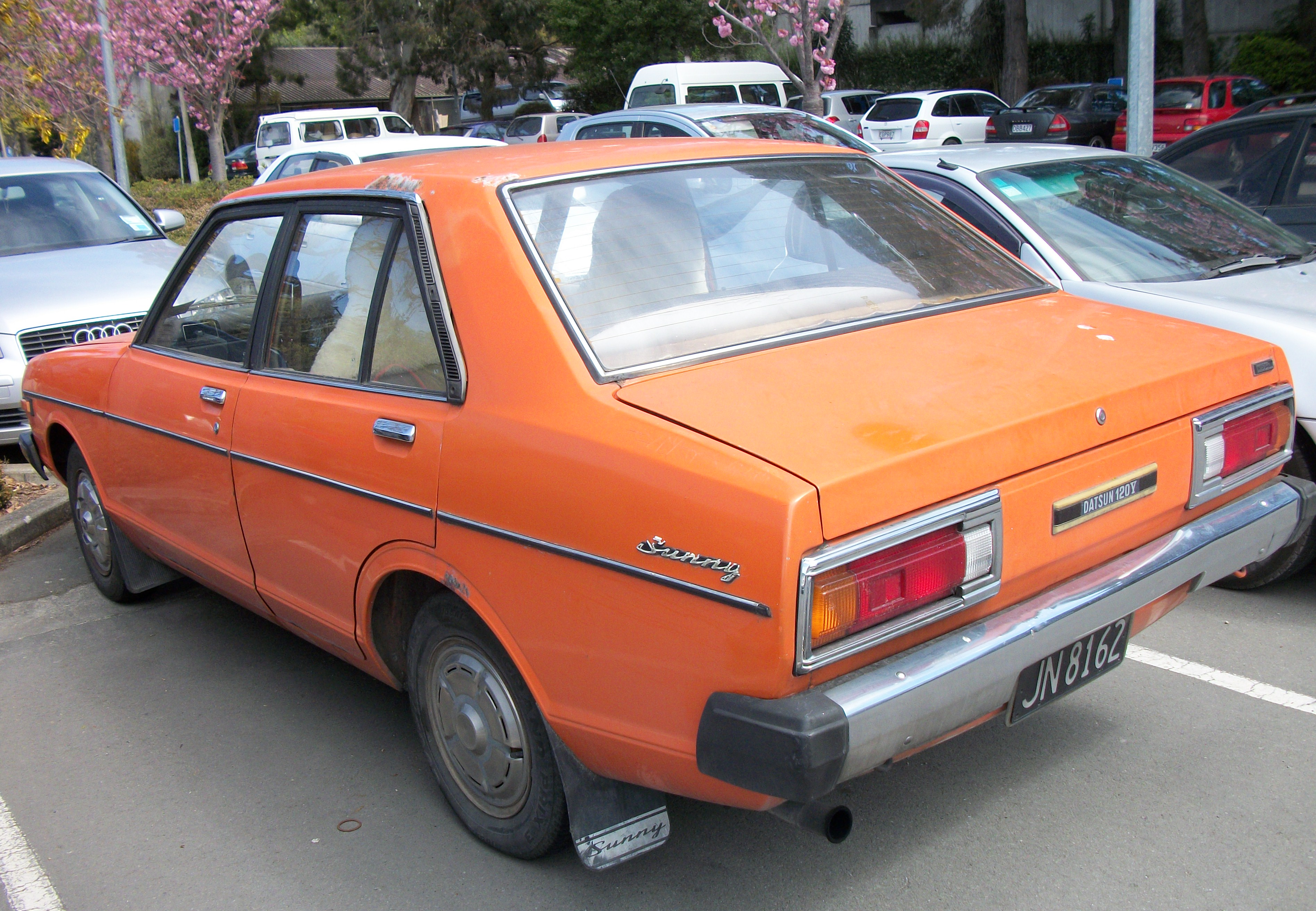
Datsun 120Y Sunny (B310) sedan in New Zealand

This was the last Sunny sold under the "Datsun" brand in Japan. The final rear-wheel-drive Sunny from model year 1978 to 1982 featured numerous variants, including a fastback station wagon as well as more squared-off, utilitarian models with three and five doors, a coupé, and two- and four-door sedans. They were first introduced in October 1977, going on sale on 21 November in Japan. The design received a certain amount of criticism, with Car Styling Quarterly calling it old-fashioned and dumpy at the rear, while the plastic detailing was referred to as overworked. It was, however, recognizable as a Nissan house design. This generation was also the last Sunny to utilize the front engine and rear-wheel drive layout.

At home they only received the new A12A engine and the slightly larger A14, although the Van continued to receive the earlier, smaller, A12 engine. The "Excellent" trim package was discontinued as the top level model, and the B211 van continued to be built for a little while longer. In Japan in February 1978 the Sunny Coupé 1400SGX-E and the 1400GX-E appeared, as a replacement for the previous Sunny Excellent Coupé. The "E" denotes multiport fuel injection, an option offered only in Japan.

These models appeared with Datsun 120Y, 130Y, 140Y and 150Y badges in some markets (reflecting the engine size) though Sunny was increasingly used for export, too. The North American version was marketed as the Datsun 210. The B310 was known for its high equipment levels and build quality at the time. It was available with the same A-series engines as its predecessor although the B210's optional 63-series five-speed transmission was replaced with the more compact and lighter 60-series unit, with a standard gear pattern. On all body variants except the Van and "squareback" wagon, the leaf spring rear suspension was replaced by a more advanced coil spring four-link configuration, while the front had struts with coilover springs. Other than that, the chassis was very similar to that of the B210, albeit with a beefier front suspension and a relocated fuel tank in the sedans. It was now beneath the floor of the trunk, freeing up more space for luggage. The body was designed to provide fewer moisture traps, helping protect the car against rust, while added width meant additional space, particularly for the rear seat passengers.

In October 1979, the B310 was given a mild facelift, with a smoothed off front end, a grille with square headlamps, and a redesigned dashboard. The vans retained the old design, but their chassis codes (unlike the passenger models) changed from 310 to 311 to reflect that they met new emissions standards in place for light commercials. At the end of November 1980 the A12A and A14 engines were replaced by the marginally larger A13 and A15 versions in the Japanese markets (with available fuel injection for the A15). The slow-selling two-door sedan was reduced to the low-cost 1300 CT and DX models. At the end of 1981 passenger car versions of the B310 were replaced by the front-wheel drive B11 Sunny, although the Vans continued to be built for a few more years. With the end of passenger car production in October 1981, the Van models chassis codes was changed and they became the VB312 series.

In North America, the only wagon offered was the fastback version. In Japan, this fastback wagon was a special model called the Sunny California, aimed at private buyers unlike the square-backed 3-and 5-door Sunny Van (although for the Japanese market these vans were always fully glazed and usually had a back seat) meant for the long-standing Japanese commercial wagon market. In most other markets the more traditional two-box wagon was offered, either alone or alongside the fastback, and some countries where "no rear side glass" was part of a legal definition of a "light truck" got panelled-in versions of the three-door. The van versions also differed in that they retained the leaf spring suspension from the B210, and in most markets had a more spartan interior trim with vinyl covered seats. The five-door van was discontinued in November 1982 when the new and even boxier Nissan AD range was introduced. In July 1983, the AD appeared in a three-door version, meaning that the VB310 was finally retired.

This model marked the first and only time the "Sunny" name was used in Australia. This chassis, along with the A10 chassis on the 160J/Violet/Stanza formed the basis for the S110 chassis on the Nissan Silvia.

In most markets, the A12 engine was the only, or most common engine offered. However B310s in various markets were fitted with the following A-series engines (JIS outputs are for the Japanese market, others indicated):

- A12 (1171 cc), 68 PS (50 kW) JIS at 6000 rpm, 52 PS (38 kW) DIN (Europe)
- A12A (1237 cc), 70 PS (51 kW) JIS at 6000 rpm
- A13, (1270 cc Short Deck Engine), 74 PS (54 kW) JIS at 6000 rpm
- A14, 80 PS (59 kW) JIS at 6000 rpm, 63 PS (46 kW) DIN at 5600 rpm (Europe)

A14E, fuel injection and 92 PS (68 kW) JIS at 6400 rpm

- A15 (from late 1980), 83 PS (61 kW) JIS at 5600 rpm, 70 PS (51 kW) DIN at 5200 rpm (Europe)

A15E, fuel injection and 92 PS (68 kW) JIS at 6000 rpm

=== Datsun 210 (1979) ===
In North America, the Datsun 210 engine line ups were as follows:

- 1979: A12A (late introduction) or A14
- 1980–1982: A12A, A14 or A15

The 210 was available in North America as a two- or four-door sedan, a five-door wagon (the sloping fastback style), or as a three-door hatchback coupé. At the time of introduction all models, excepting the wagon with the automatic transmission, received the carryover 1.4 litre A14 engine with 65 hp (48 kW). The automatic wagon (soon all wagons) received the somewhat larger A15 engine with 67 hp (50 kW).

New for 1981, the special "210 MPG" model was a small-port A14 (losing three horsepower in the process) with five-speed overdrive transmission and achieved 40 mpg_{‑US} (5.9 L/100 km; 48 mpg_{‑imp}) per US standards. For 1981, this was the only 1.4 available. All other versions excepting the standard 1.2 received the larger 1.5. Even the most powerful 1.5-litre option produced only 65 hp (48 kW; 66 PS), being strangled by the required desmogging equipment. The smallest 1.2 was only available as a four-speed, two-door sedan with very basic equipment. The 1.2 Standard was only available with a four-speed manual transmission and produces 56 hp (42 kW).

The 210 continued to be available until April 1982, when it was replaced by the Sentra, a rebadged version of the B11 Sunny.

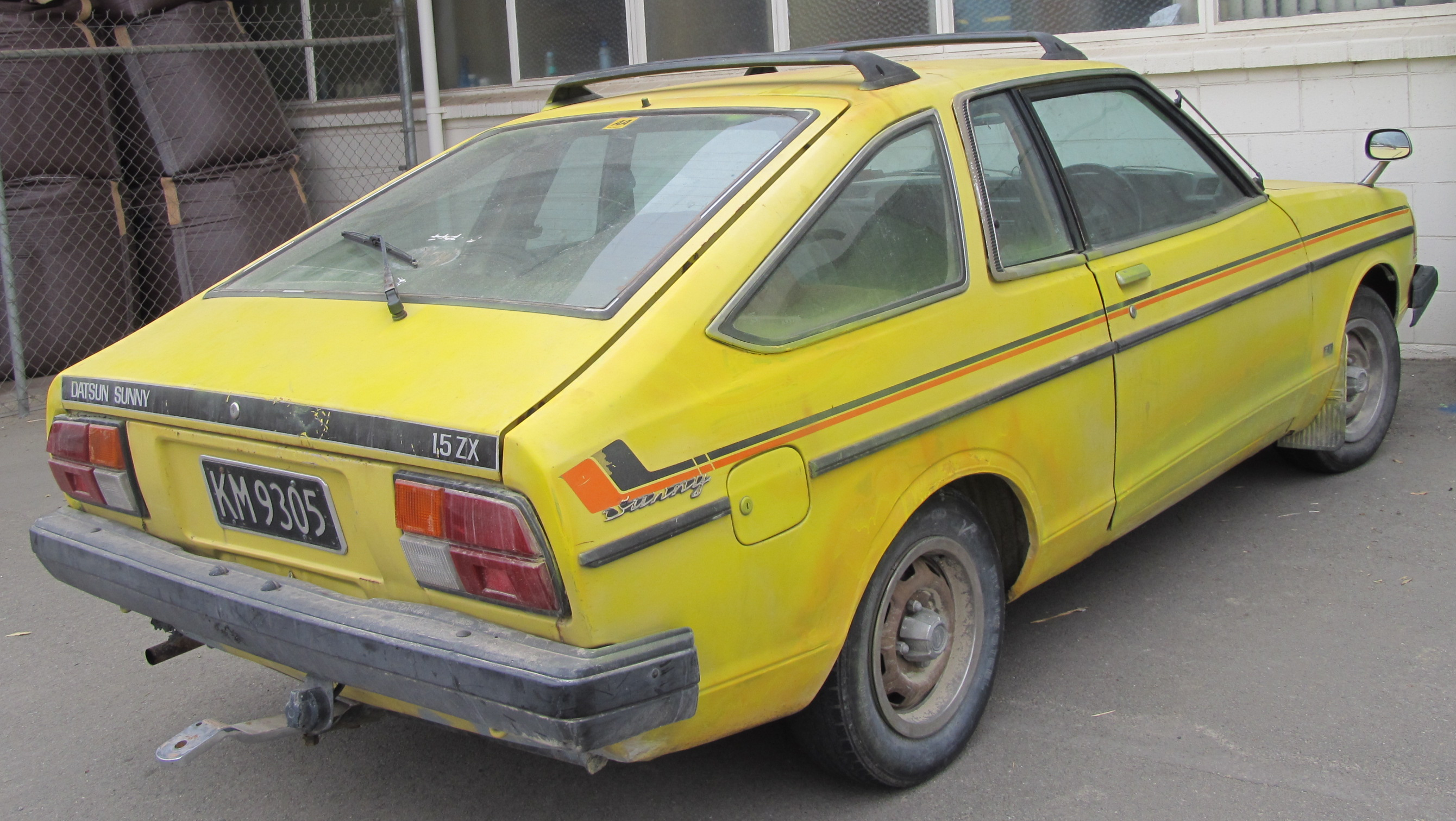
Datsun Sunny 1.5 ZX (B310 series) fastback coupé in New Zealand

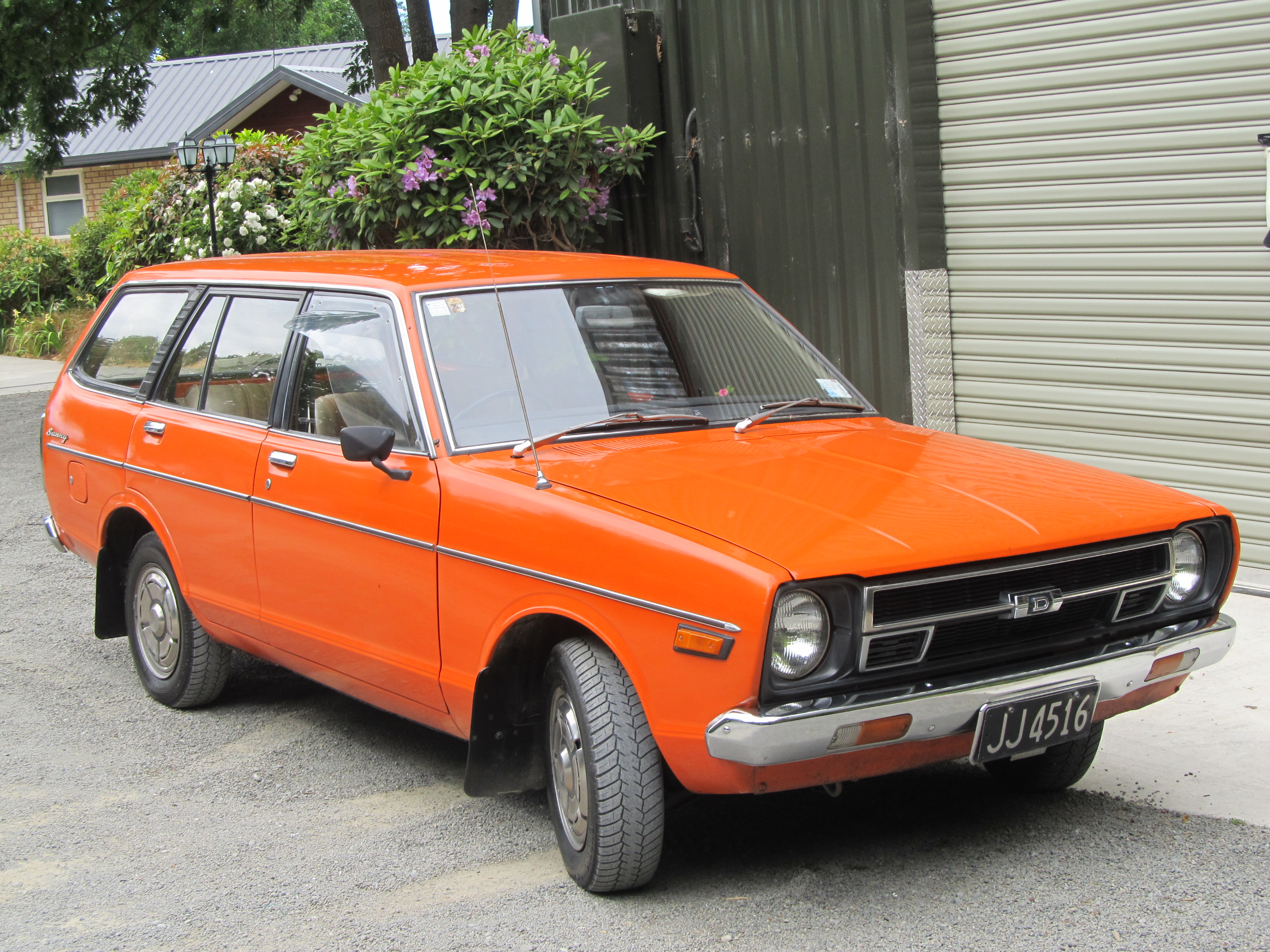
Datsun Sunny B310 wagon

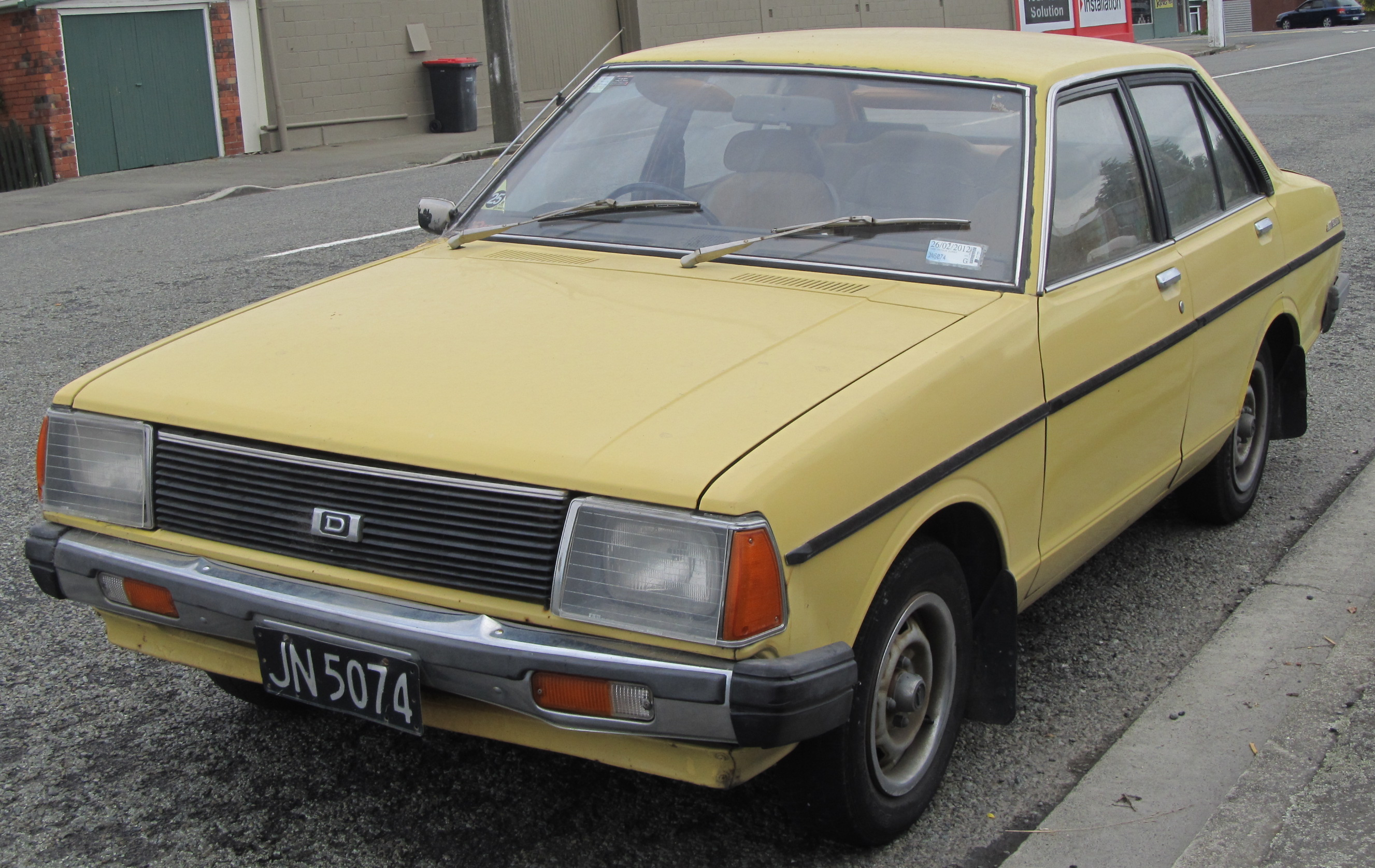
Facelift Datsun Sunny sedan in New Zealand

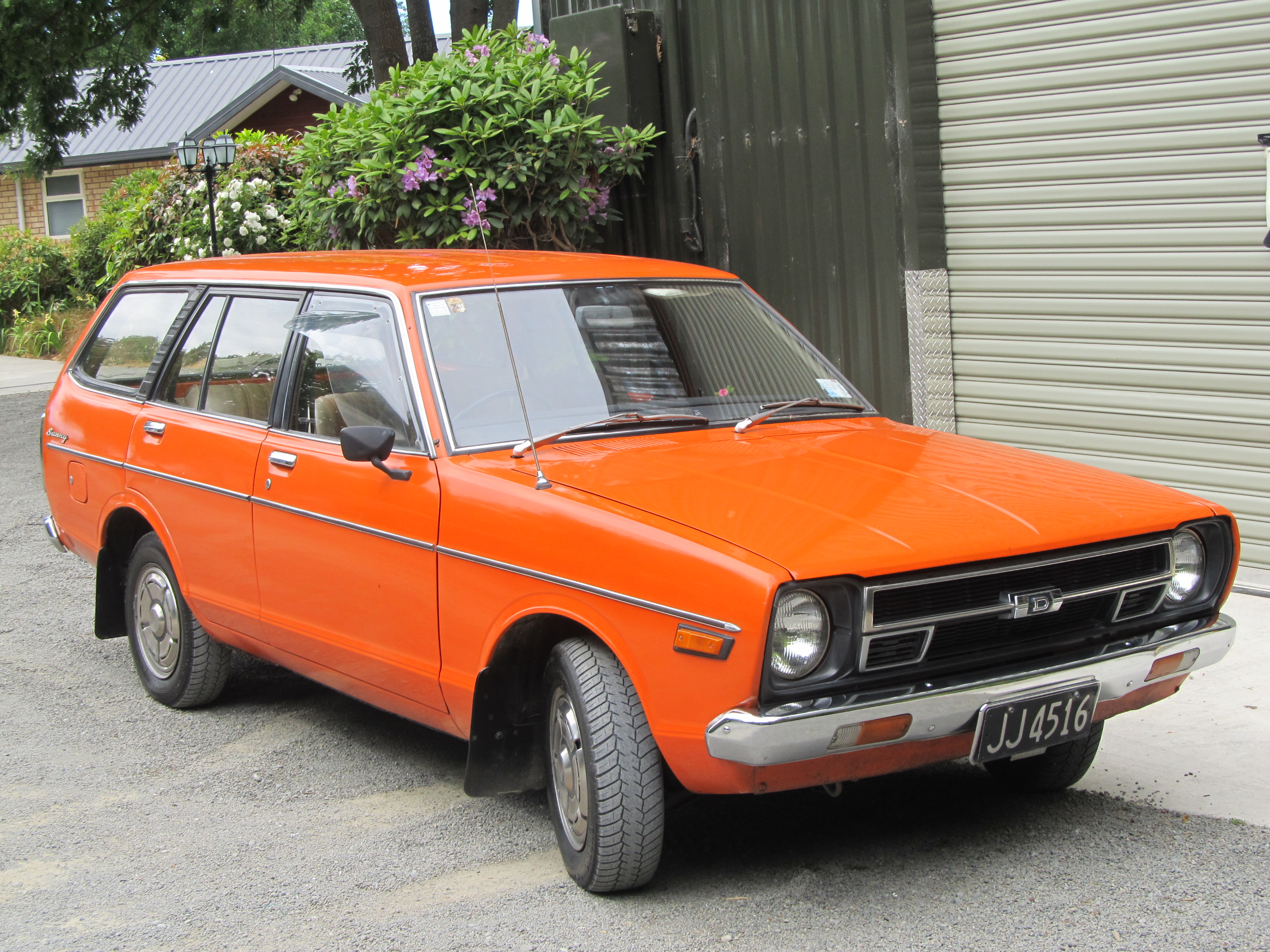
1979 Sunny wagon (New Zealand)

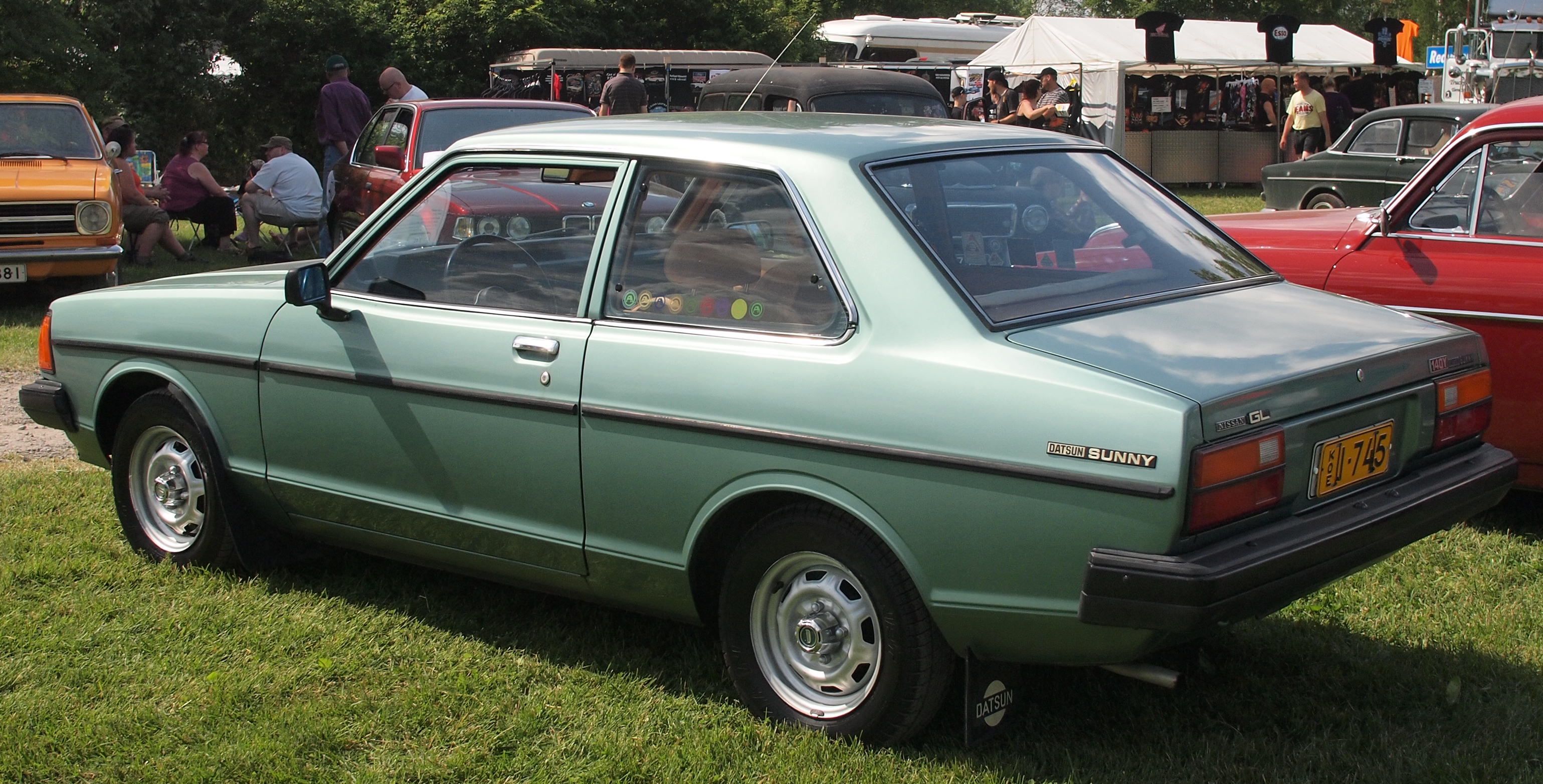
Datsun Sunny 140Y 2-door sedan (Europe)

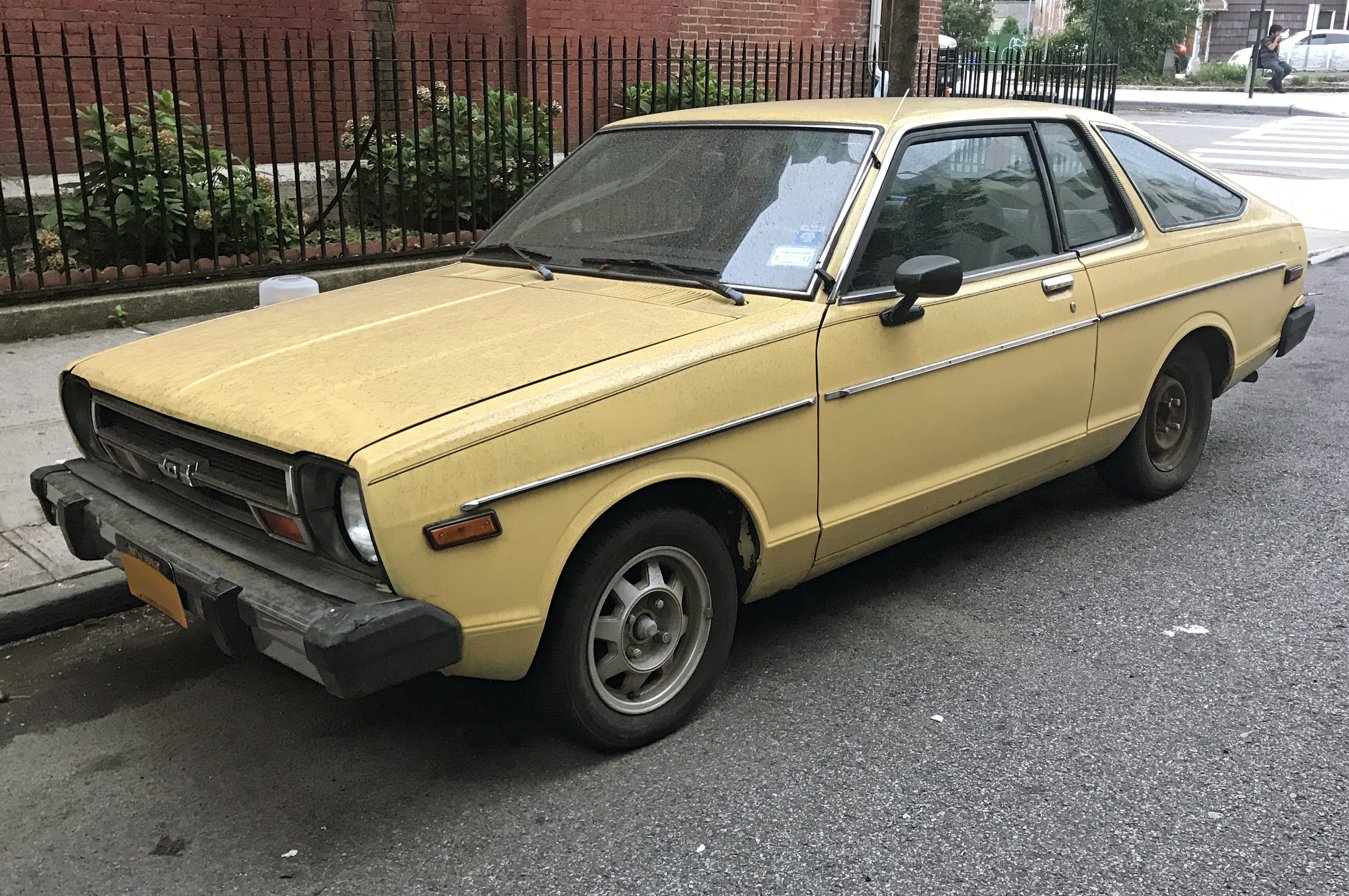
1979 Datsun Sunny 210 Hatchback in the US

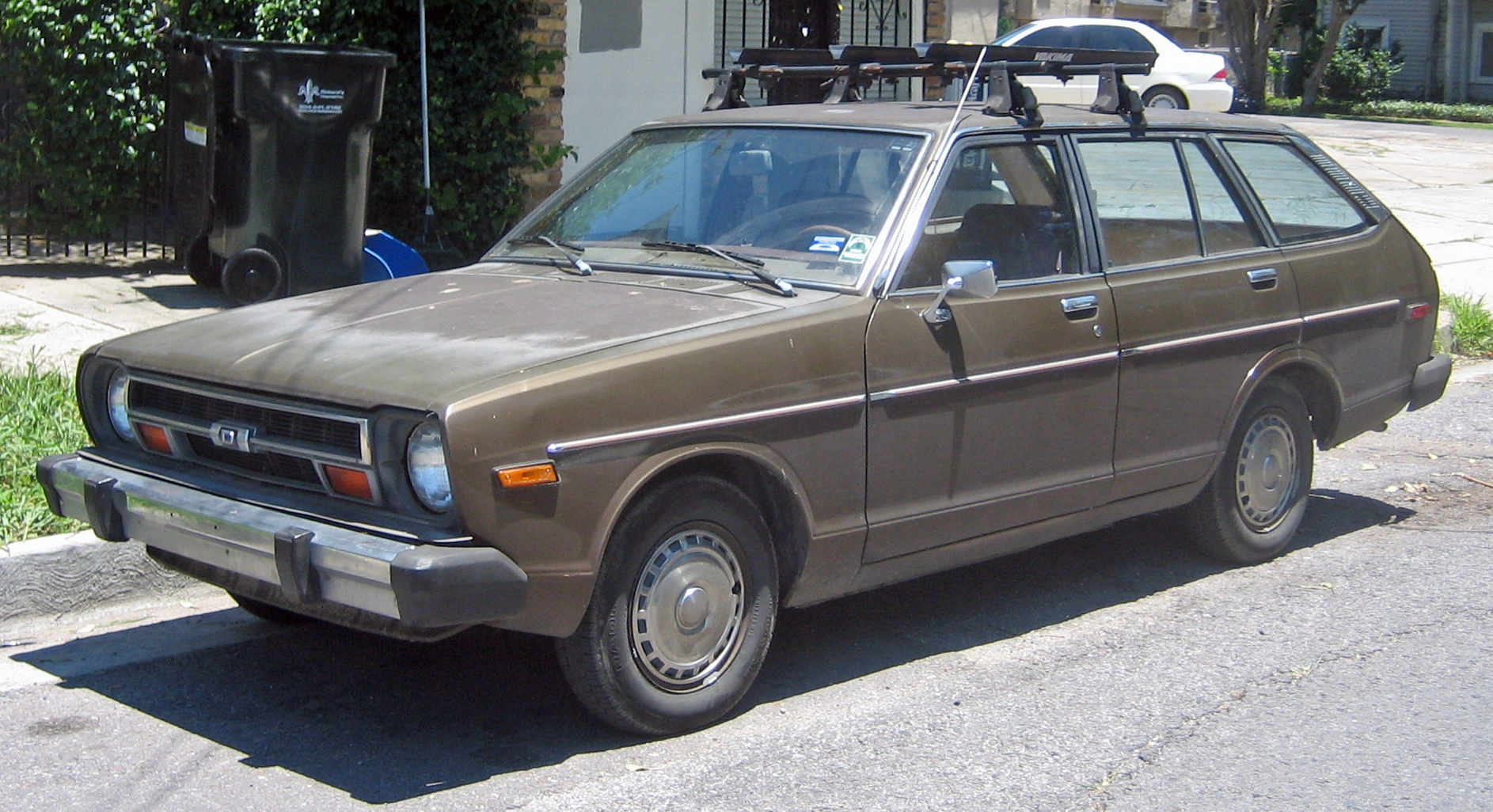
1979 Datsun 210 Wagon (US)

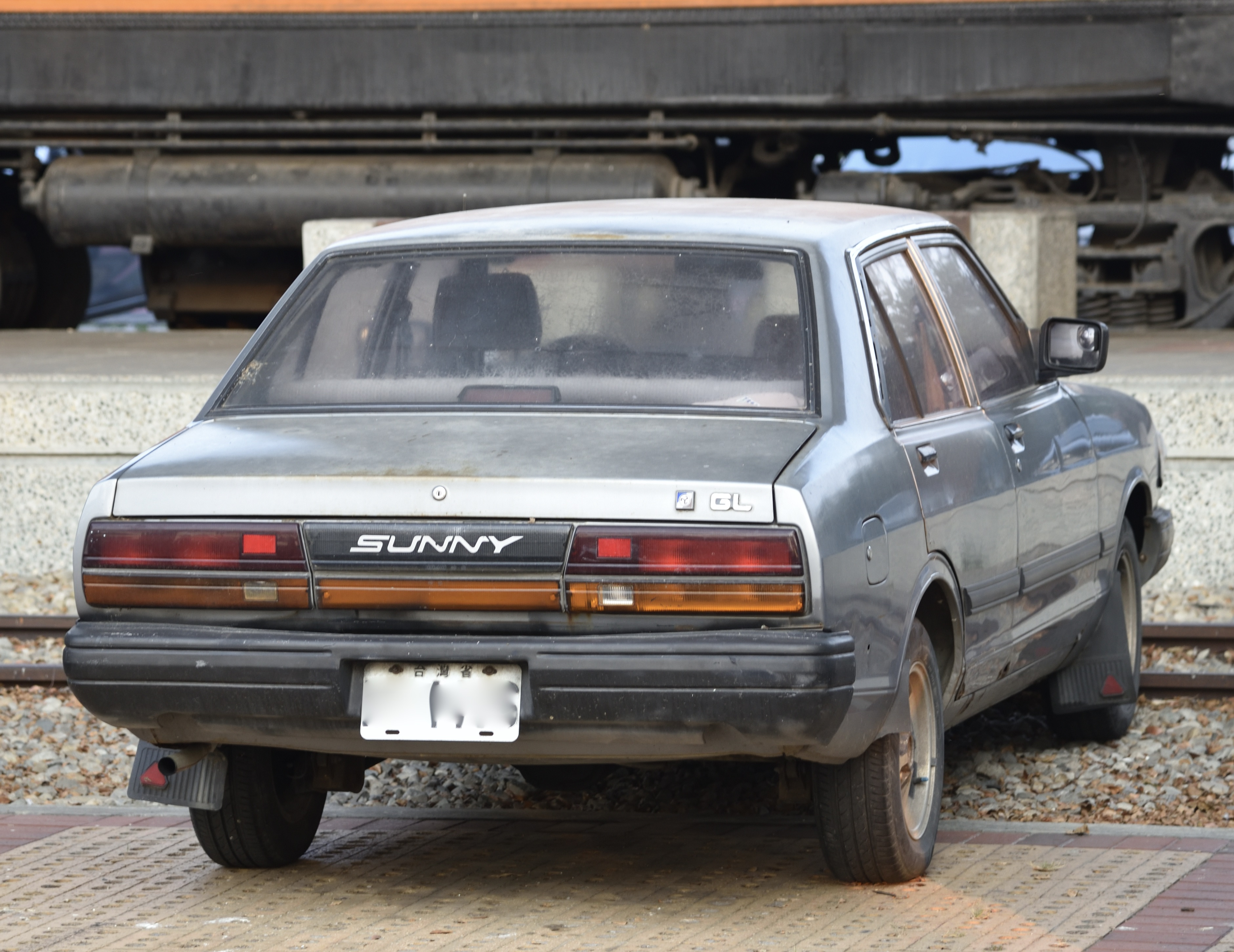
Yue Loong Sunny GL 303 in Taiwan

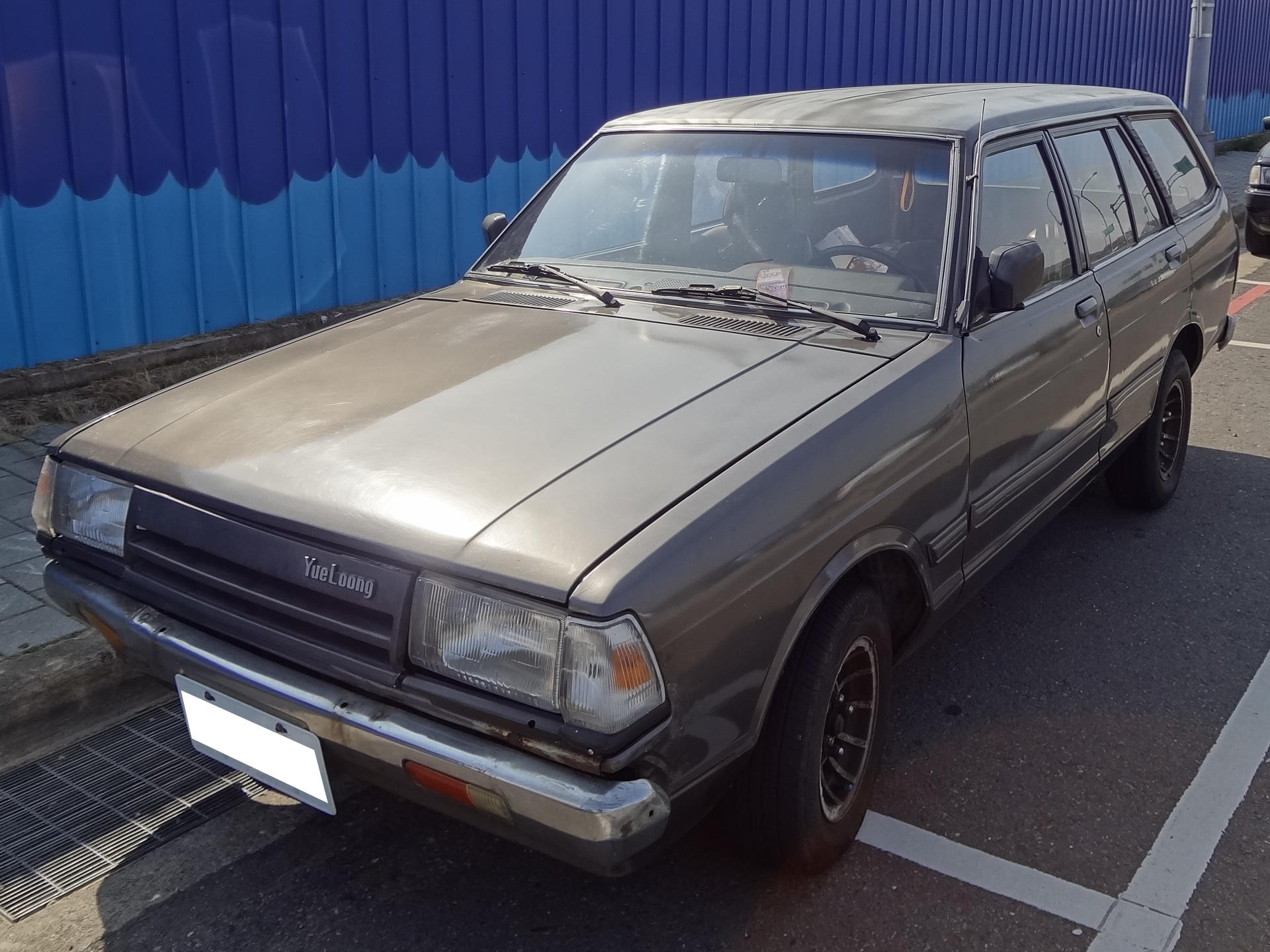
Yue Loong Sunny wagon 303W in Taiwan

=== YLN 302/303 ===
In Taiwan, Yue Loong continued building the B310 series until the 1990s as a lower priced alternative to more modern Sunnys. Originally introduced as the YLN 302, with SD or DX equipment (Standard, DeLuxe) it underwent a facelift in 1981 in parallel with Nissan's Sunny, becoming the YLN 303. After another facelift (in 1989), it became the YLN 303S. The station wagon was also offered in Taiwan, as the YLN 303W. The Yue Loong-built B310s were only ever available with the 1.2-litre A12 engine.

== Fifth generation (B11; 1981) ==
Datsun/Nissan Sunny B11 Series
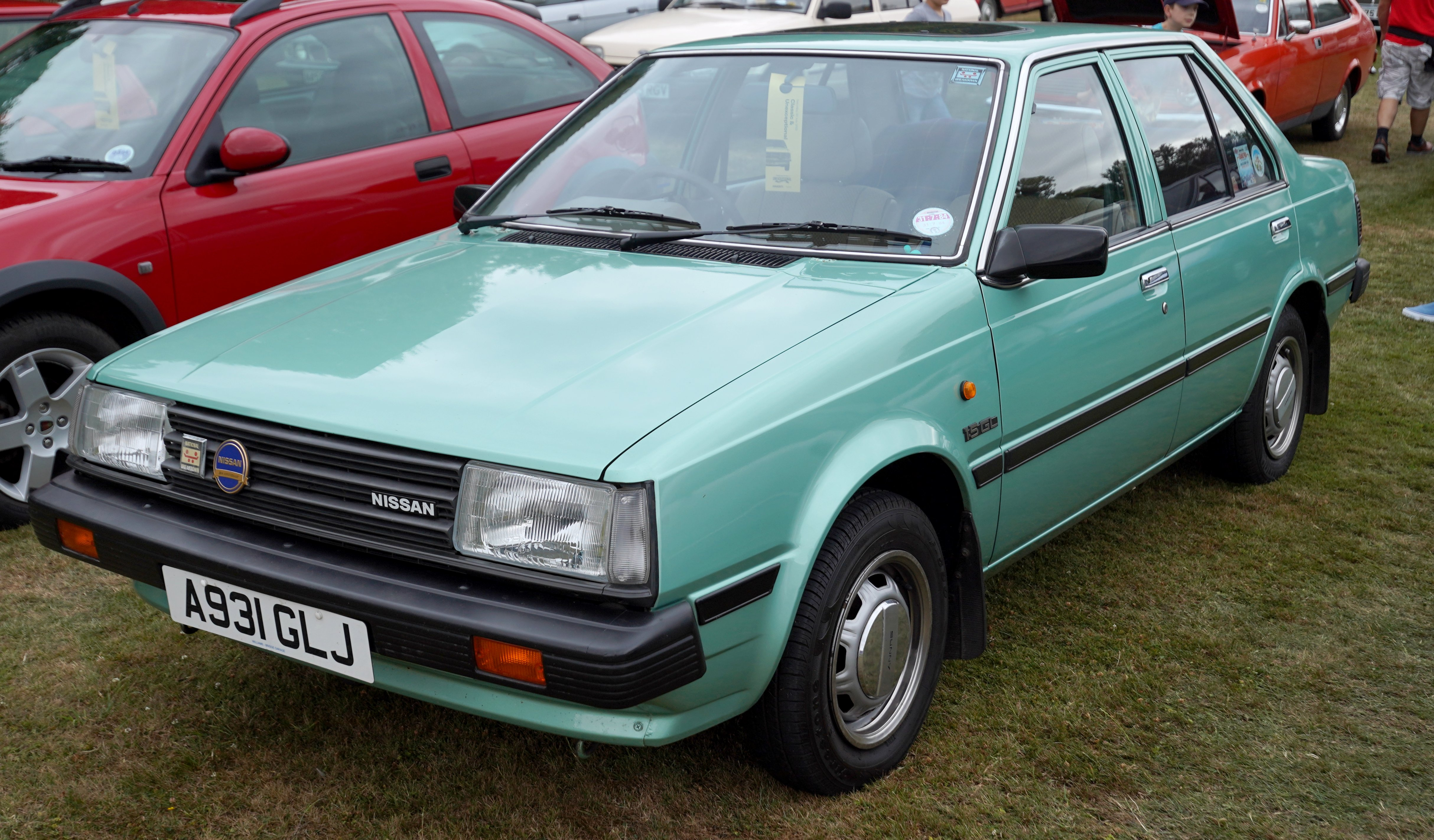
- Nissan Sunny 1.5 GL (B11) in the UK

Overview
- Also called: Datsun Sunny; Nissan Sentra; Nissan Tsuru; Yue Loong 311
- Production: 1981–1985; 1982 – June 1996 (Malaysia & Thailand); 1984–1987 (Mexico)
- Assembly: Japan: Zama Plant, Zama, Kanagawa; Malaysia: Kuala Lumpur; Mexico: Cuernavaca, Morelos; Thailand: Samut Prakan

Body and chassis
- Class: Subcompact
- Body style: 3-door hatchback; 2/4-door sedan; 3-door coupé; 3/5-door wagon/van
- Layout: Front-engine, front-wheel-drive

Powertrain
- Engine: Petrol: 988 cc E10 I4 (export only); 1270 cc E13 I4; 1488 cc E15 I4; 1488 cc E15E T turbo I4; 1597 cc E16 I4 (Mexico); 1597 cc E16ST turbo I4 (Mexico); diesel: 1680 cc CD17 I4
- Transmission: 4- or 5-speed manual; 3-speed automatic

Dimensions
- Wheelbase: 2,400 mm (94.5 in)
- Length: 4,050–4,255 mm (159.4–167.5 in)
- Width: 1,620 mm (63.8 in)
- Height: 1,360–1,390 mm (53.5–54.7 in)
- Curb weight: 745–910 kg (1,600–2,000 lb)

Introduced in late 1981 (at the Tokyo Motor Show), the B11s were the first front-wheel-drive Sunnys, predating by a year and a half the switch to front-wheel drive by their main Toyota Corolla rival, and were exported to the United States as the Nissan Sentra from the 1982 model year onwards. European sales began in May 1982, with this version of the Sunny going on sale at a time when front-wheel drive was quickly becoming the most popular layout on family cars in Europe. The B11 series shared its engines and much of its underpinnings with the Nissan Pulsar (N12) which launched around the same time, effectively providing the hatchback body style in this size class which in the European market was becoming the widely preferred configuration. Because the Sunny and Cherry/Pulsar had grown substantially to fill this market need, the supermini size class was filled by the Nissan Micra/March that also launched the same year. Ultimately, the Sunny and Cherry/Pulsar lines converged in the European market for the N13 generation in 1986.

The chassis code returned to the original "B" designation, then added "11" to signify a new start. The B11 was the first Sunny to be available with a diesel engine, the 61 PS (45 kW) CD17 of 1.7 litres. Most markets received 1.3 or 1.5-litre four-cylinder engines, although for some markets with strict taxation (such as Greece), the 50 PS (37 kW) 1-litre E10 engine was also available. The 1.3 and 1.5 as sold in Europe have 60 and 75 PS (44 and 55 kW) respectively.

The fuel injected 1.5 L turbo was introduced to Japan only September 1982, offered only in the 3-door hatchback body style, and was called the "Sunny Turbo Leprix", and was rarely exported. The installation of a turbo on the top level model enabled Nissan to offer a performance version without unduly increasing emission tax liability for Japanese buyers, while offering higher fuel efficiency and lower emissions than a larger, conventionally tuned engine. The turbo and the diesel were both later additions to the lineup, having been presented in September 1982. The Sunny Turbo Leprix was sold in the United Kingdom as the "Sunny Maxima Coupe", alongside the "Sunny Maxima" sedan.

A further spin-off from the Sunny line was the Nissan Laurel Spirit (in Japanese), which was essentially a rebadged and better equipped Sunny sedan designed to capitalize on the premium image of the larger Nissan Laurel. The Laurel Spirit was exclusive to Nissan Store which sold the Laurel, while the Sunny remained exclusive to Nissan Satio Store. The Laurel Spirit was offered in four trim packages, starting with the LT, LT-G, LF, XJ, and the XJ-E denoting a fuel injected E15E engine. In 1983 the top level XJ was installed with a turbocharger, designated as the Laurel Spirit Turbo XJ.

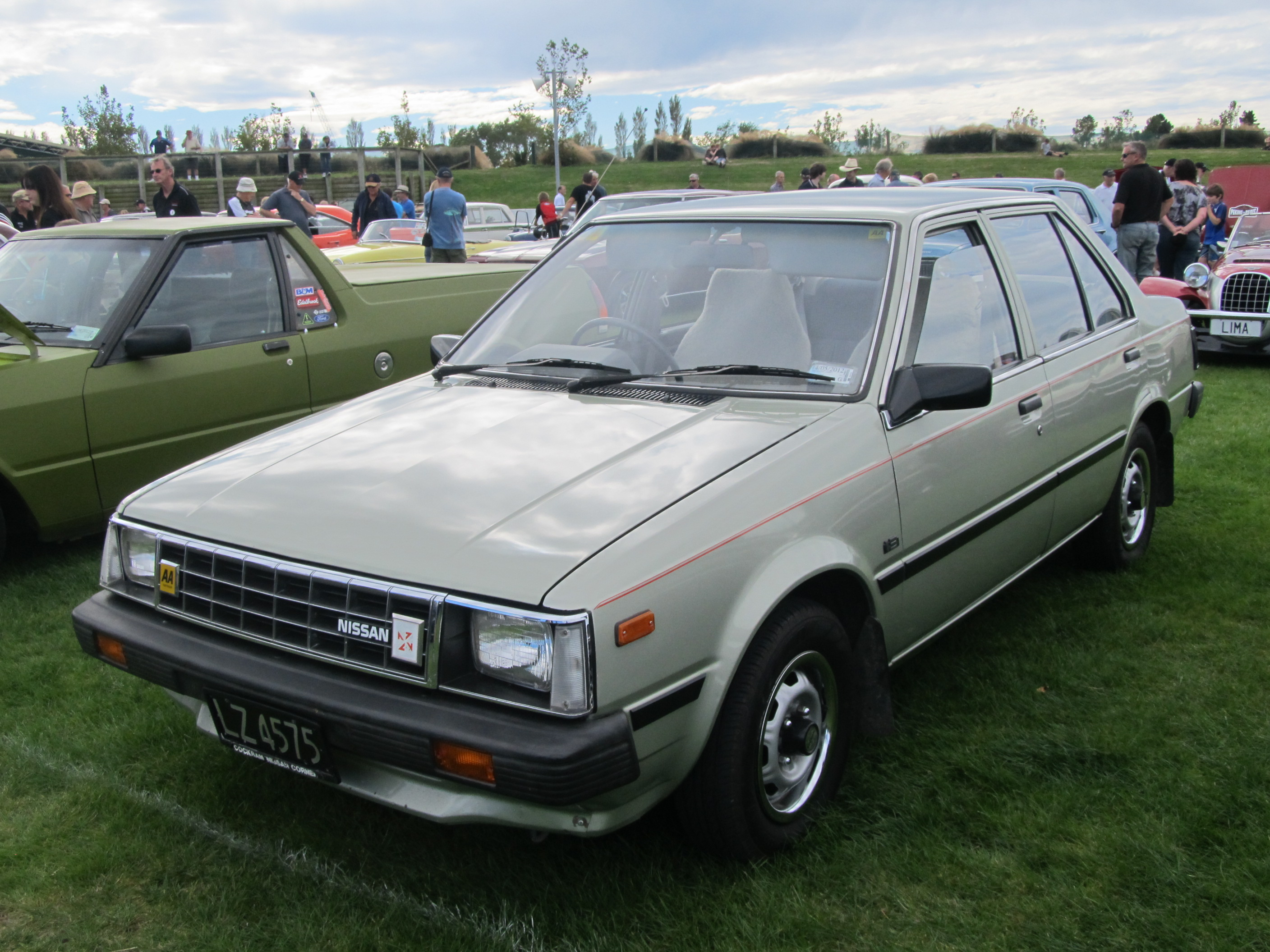
Nissan Sunny Maxima 1.5i SGL

The Laurel Spirit was exported as the "Nissan Sunny Maxima SGL", which was sold in limited numbers in the United Kingdom. This was not in any way related to the much larger "Bluebird Maxima" (which was simply just sold as the "Maxima" in the United States). The "Sunny Maxima" line consisted only of upgrades such as a sunroof, enhanced exterior trim, only available with a five-speed manual, chrome tailpipe, dual waveband radio meeting United Kingdom radio authority specifications, and deluxe carpeted floor mats. The B11 Sunny was originally sold in the United Kingdom in 1.3 DX, 1.3 GL, 1.5 DX, 1.5 GL, 1.5 GL Auto, 1.5 SGL and 1.5 SGL Spirit variants.

In 1982, the Sunny platform was used to introduce a new MPV body style in Japan, called the Nissan Prairie. It was introduced at Nissan Store locations and went on to be sold globally, although this concept did not take off in Europe until the huge success of the Renault Scénic in the late 1990s.

The B11 series was regarded as one of Nissan's most modern ranges at the time, and was the first to abandon the Datsun name formally (though a small 'Datsun' still appeared on boot lids for the first two years). The wagon was known in its home market as the "Nissan Sunny California", and Nissan installed the turbocharged engine in October 1983 for Japanese customers only. It was launched in late 1981 and continued into 1985. After the succeeding B12 had been presented, the B11 Sunny soldiered on as the "Sunny 130Y" as a lower-cost alternative in certain export markets, including Malaysia; production there continued well into the nineties. While a hatchback version was available for a little while in Japan (and very briefly in North America), this body style was built in comparably small numbers as the Pulsar generally replaced the hatchback in most markets. The two-door sedan was only sold in North America, with Sentra badges.

The station wagon model remained in production until 1990, as no estate version of the next generation Sunny was produced.

=== Foreign production ===
==== Latin America ====
The B11 was sold as the Nissan Tsuru in Mexico, a nameplate used until 2017 when it was discontinued and replaced with the Versa. It was the first car sold as a Nissan in Mexico. Also, the three-door hatchback coupé was known as the Nissan Tsuru Samurai. For 1986, the 1.5 L engine was replaced by the 1.6 L and for 1987 the Tsuru Samurai received a sporty version called the Nissan Ninja Turbo which included a low boost turbocharger with carburetor and prominent Ninja stickers on the low side of the doors. The regular Sunny Coupé was also sold as the "Nissan Ninja" in 1987, equipped with the 80 hp (60 kW) E16S while the locally developed turbocharged version of that engine (E16T) with 93 hp (69 kW).

Mexican-made B11s were exported to other Latin American markets as well. They entered Chile in 1987 (replacing the Japanese-made Sunny which had been on sale since 1983), carrying "Sunny" badging. In Chile it was mainly sold with the E13 and E15 engines, although a handful of the turbocharged 1.6 were also delivered as the "Sunny Ninja Turbo" and the 1.7-litre diesel was available in the sedan model for a few years. The B11 Sunny was the most sold car in Chile in 1989 and 1990 and continued to be available alongside the B12 as well as the B13 Sunnys; these were sold as the "Sentra" and the "V16" so as to separate them in the marketplace. The B11 was available in Chile until August 1991.

==== Taiwan ====
As usual, Nissan's Taiwanese subsidiary Yue Loong assembled a local version of the B11 Sunny. It was available as a four-door sedan or a five-door wagon, with 1.2-, 1.3-, and 1.5-litre engines. It was marketed as the YLN 311 SD or GX, depending on equipment levels. Taiwanese Sunnys were fitted with the larger bumpers as used in the North American markets; it is unknown why this is the case.

=== Nissan AD ===
A five-door station wagon on Sunny basis meant for use as a delivery van was also introduced. This had different bodywork from the Sunny California wagon and was called the Nissan AD Van in the domestic market. It was also exported to many countries, usually with "Sunny Van" badging. It used the E15S, the E13S, and the CD17 diesel engine.

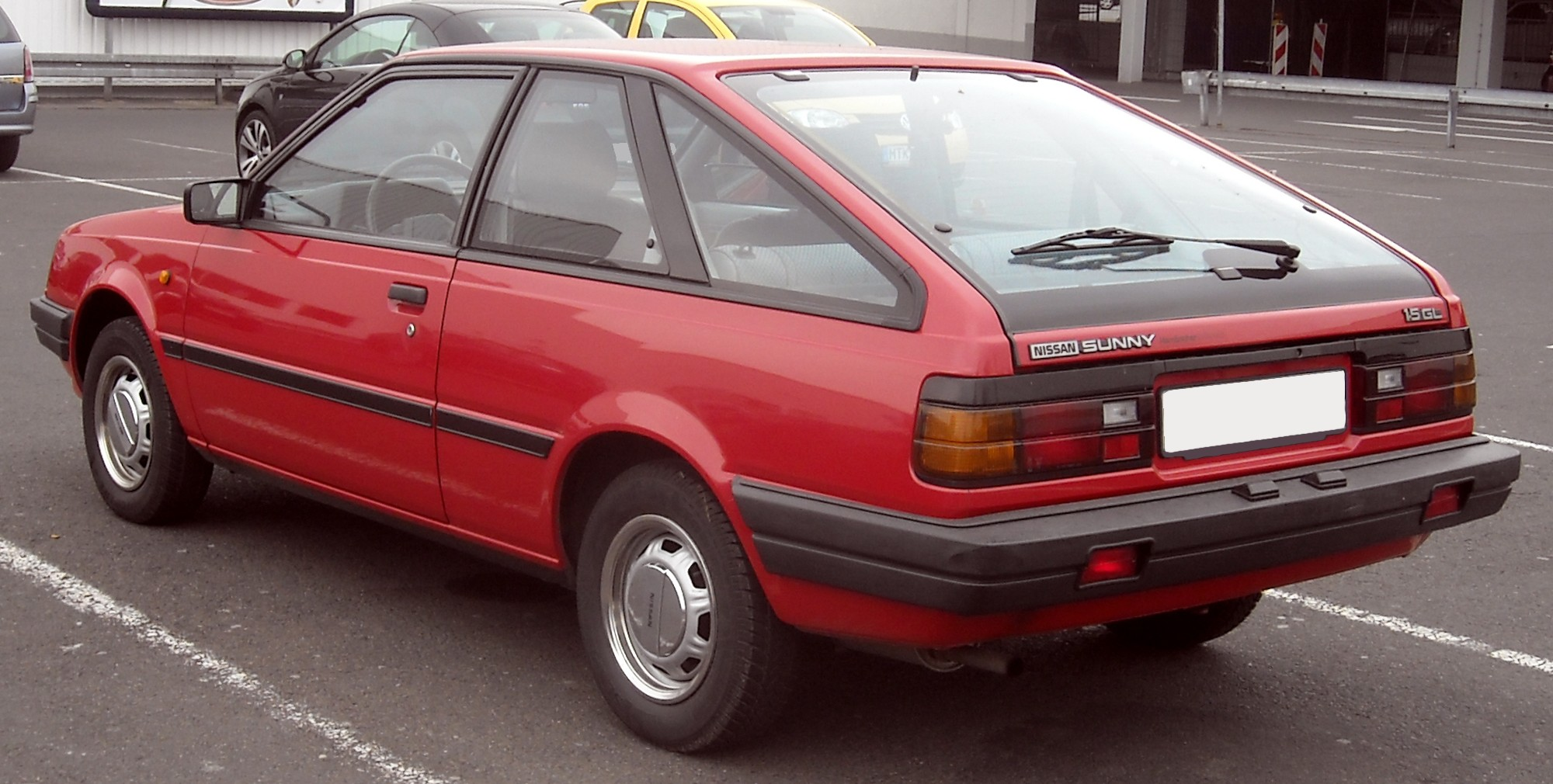
Nissan Sunny Coupé 1.5 GL (Europe)

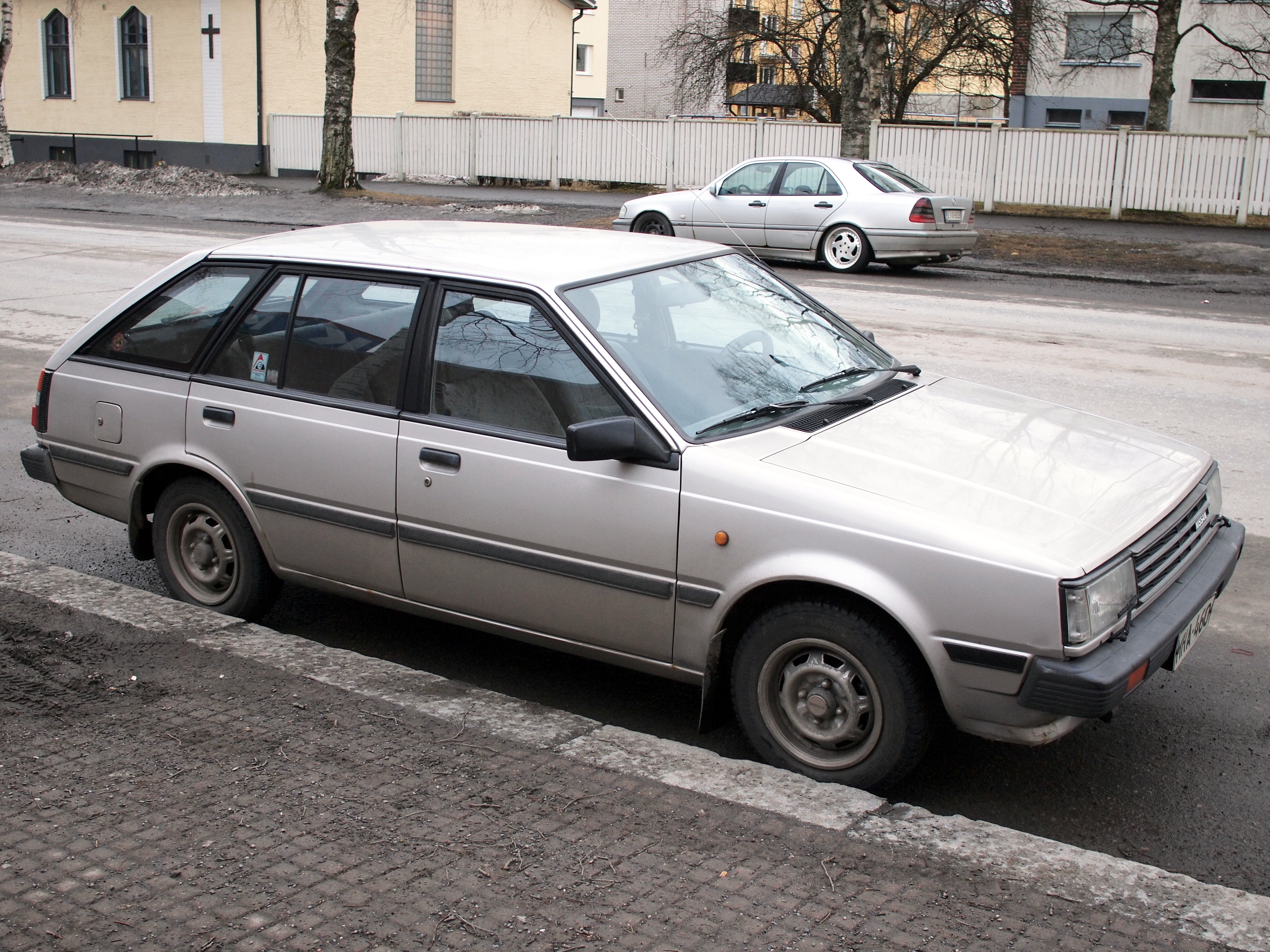
Nissan Sunny Wagon 1.5 GL (Europe)

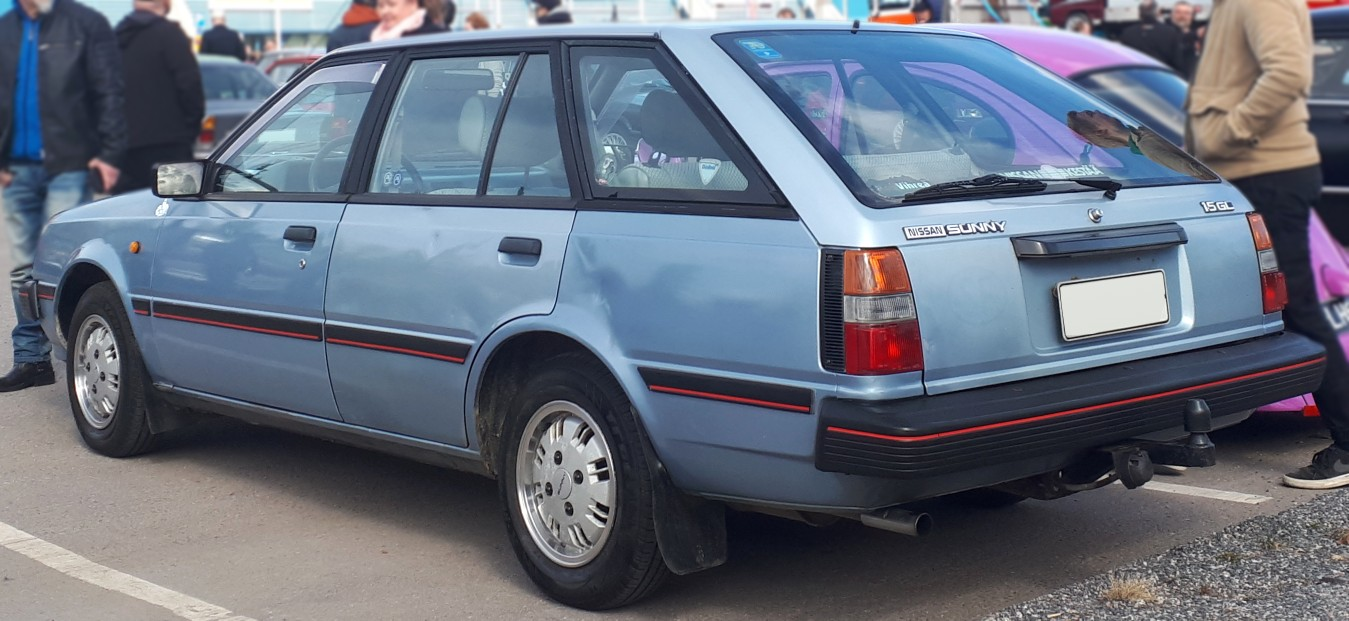
Nissan Sunny Wagon 1.5 GL (Europe)

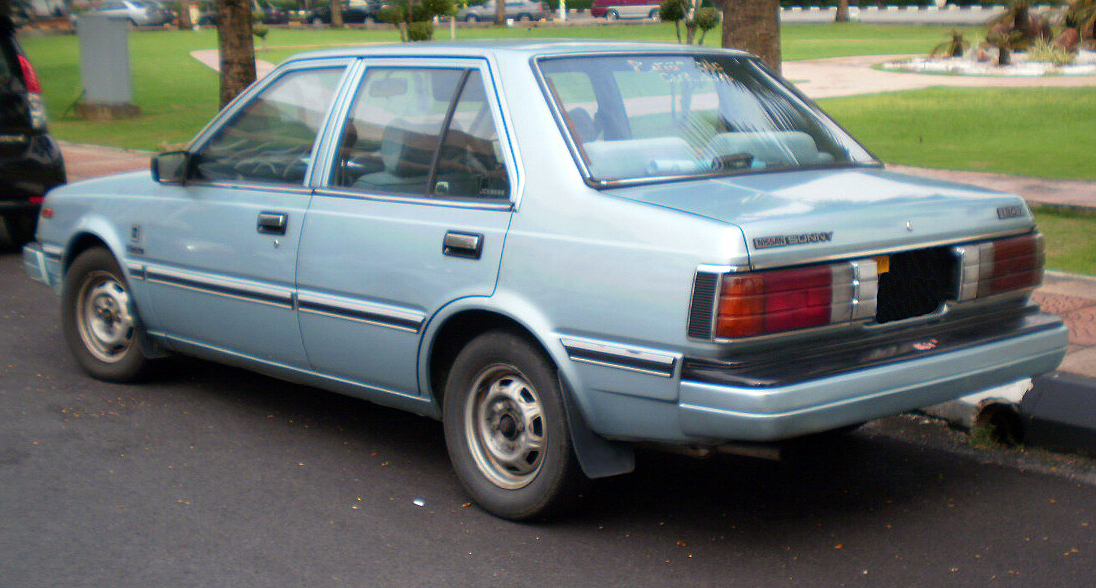
Malaysian market Nissan Sunny 130Y of the late eighties

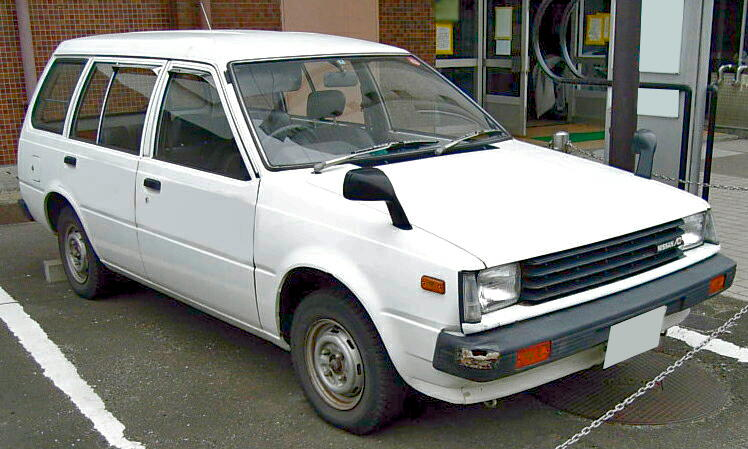
Nissan AD Van

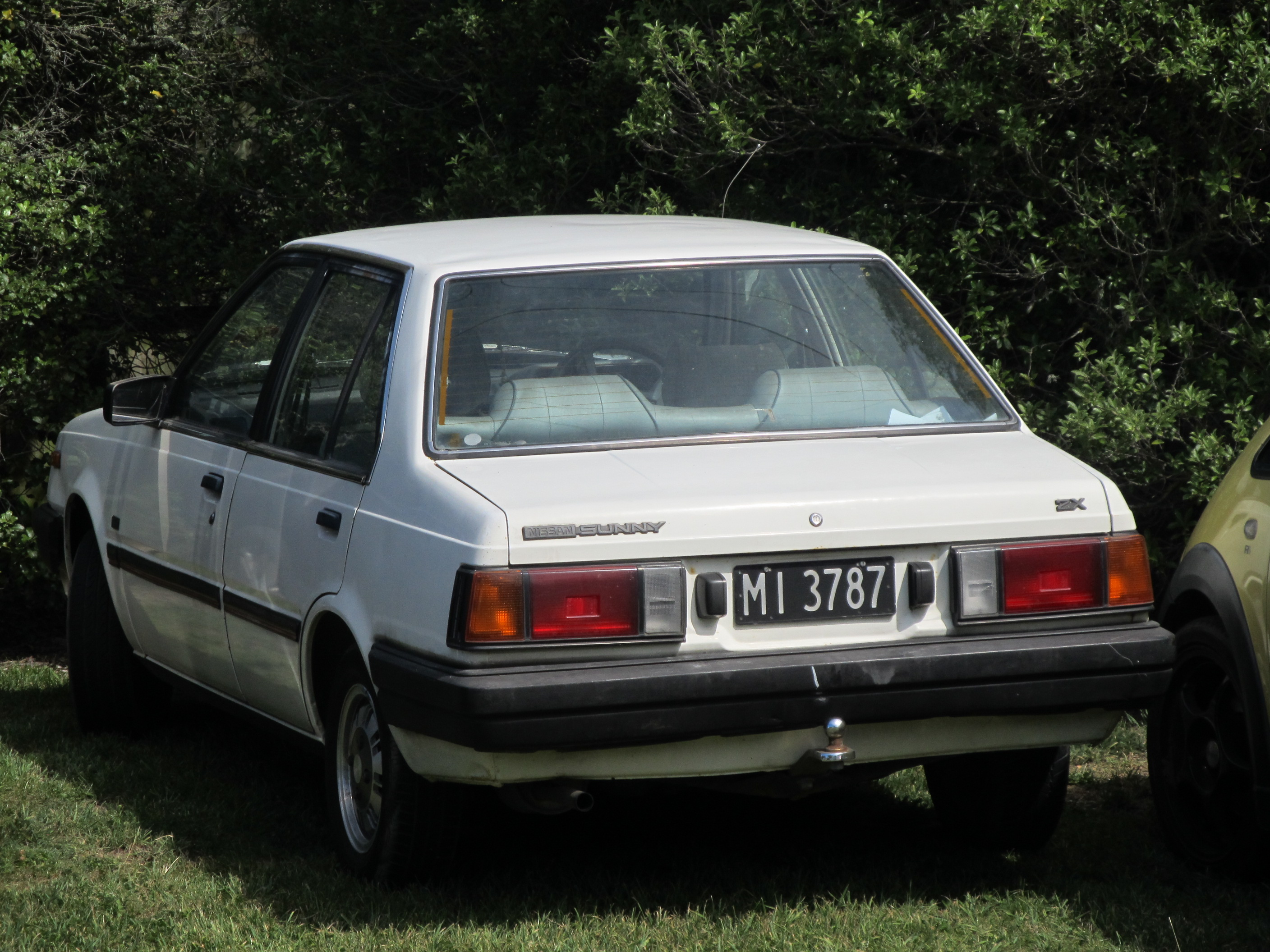
1986 Nissan Sunny ZX (B11, New Zealand)

== Sixth generation (B12; 1985) ==
Nissan Sunny B12 series
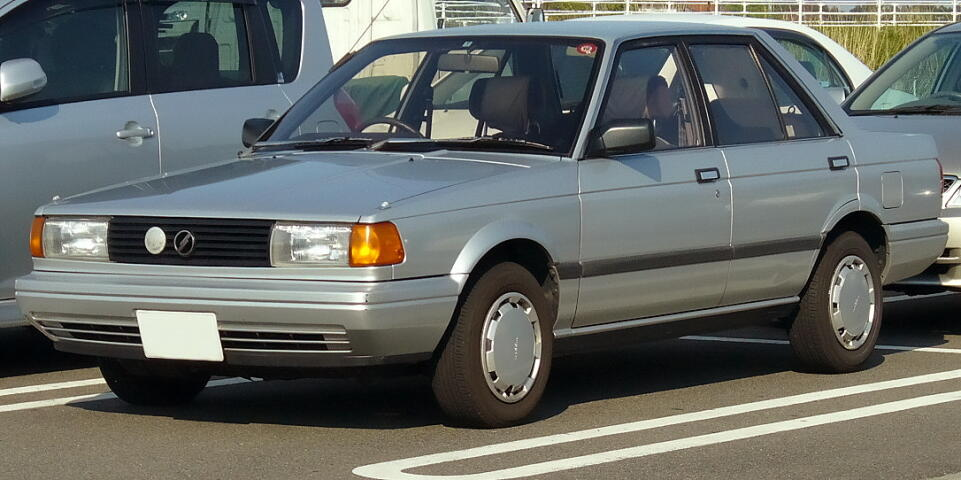
- 1987 Nissan Sunny sedan (B12) in Japan

Overview
- Also called: Nissan Sentra; Nissan Tsuru II (Mexico); Nissan Hikari (Mexico, coupé)
- Production: 1985–1990
- Assembly: Japan: Oppama Plant, Yokosuka, Kanagawa; Mexico: Cuernavaca, Morelos; Philippines: Makati

Body and chassis
- Body style: 3-door hatchback; 4-door sedan; 5-door station wagon; 3-door sport coupé
- Layout: Front-engine, front-wheel-drive / four-wheel-drive

Powertrain
- Engine: 1270 cc E13S I4 (B12); 1487 cc E15S/E I4 (HB12); 1487 cc E15ET turbo I4 (HB12); 1497 cc GA15S/E I4 (FB12); 1597 cc E16S/i/E I4 (KB12); 1598 cc CA16DE DOHC I4 (EB12); 1809 cc CA18DE DOHC I4; 1680 cc CD17 diesel I4 (SB12)
- Transmission: 4/5-speed manual; 3-speed automatic

Dimensions
- Wheelbase: 2,430 mm (95.7 in)
- Length: 4,285 mm (168.7 in) (sedan); 4,229 mm (166.5 in) (coupé); 4,125 mm (162.4 in) (hatchback); 4,374 mm (172.2 in) (wagon)
- Width: 1,640 mm (64.6 in); 1,665 mm (65.6 in) (sport coupé)
- Height: 1,379 mm (54.3 in) (coupé, sedan & wagon); 1,326 mm (52.2 in) (sport coupé); 1,405 mm (55.3 in) (hatchback); 1,394 mm (54.9 in) (4WD wagon)

Introduced in September 1985 at the Tokyo Motor Show, the B12 was not as widely exported, apart from the station wagon model and to some extent the RZ-1 coupé. This line is characterized by its squared-off styling, which was rather unfashionable by the mid-1980s. The angular styling was insisted upon by Nissan's design chief at the time and contributed to the automaker's increasingly poor sales of the period. A four-wheel-drive variant was introduced during this generation.

In October 1986, European markets saw the B11 Sunny replaced by a rebadged N13 Pulsar in hatchback and saloon form (the hatchback replacing the previous N12 Pulsar, which had been sold as the Cherry in this market). These were sold alongside the B12 Sunny estate and coupé. In some markets, such as Greece, the N13 Pulsar retained the "Cherry" nameplate. In the UK the B12 was sold as the Nissan Sunny Estate with a 1.6L engine. The B12 Coupé (RZ-1) was also imported, with either 1.6 L or 1.8 L 16v engines.

When first introduced, Japanese-market Sunnys received 1.3 or 1.5-litre E-series petrol inline-four engines, or the 1.7-litre CD17 diesel unit. In mid-September 1987, the E15 was replaced by the new GA generation, cleaner and with more power. This was also the first Sunny to become available with optional anti-lock brakes. A twin-cam 1.6 was also added, at first only to the sporting 306 hatchback but later also in the four-door sedans. Abroad, a few other engine variations were also available, up to a 1.8-litre twin cam in Europe.

The "Sunny California"-style fastback was the only B12 wagon; the more upright B11 "Sunny Van" continued in those markets where it was previously offered. The station wagon continued in its second generation as the Nissan Wingroad and the commercial AD Van.

In Kenya (East Africa), the B12 was imported and marketed as Sunny and came with a 1.3- or a 1.5-litre petrol engine. The 1.3-litre version is assembled locally (1.3 SLX).

In Mexico the B12 Sunny was known as the Nissan Tsuru II (as the preceding generation was simply called Tsuru) and equipped with a 1.6-litre petrol engine. This model was later also exported to Canada where it carried "Sentra" badges.

The B12 was also exported to Pakistan with a rare 1000cc engine variant called the Nissan Sunny 1.0 LX. It was well received as an efficient family four-door sedan option for the Pakistani consumers.

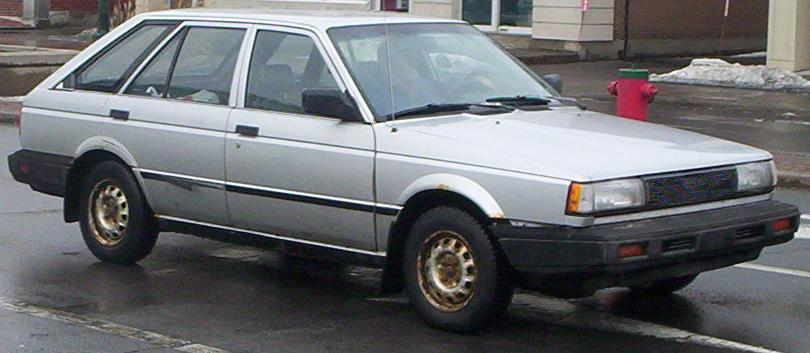
Nissan Sunny California wagon

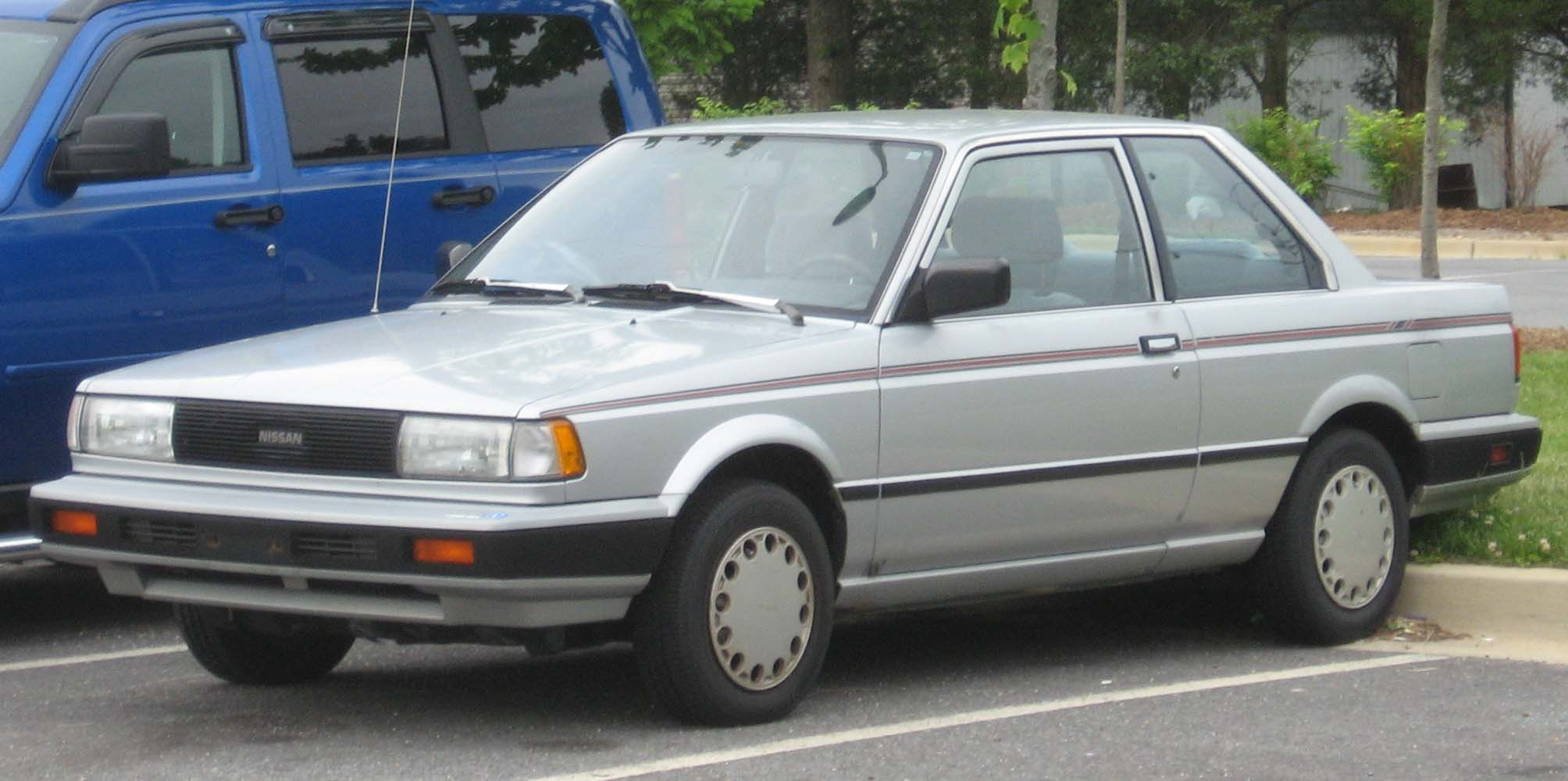
Nissan Sentra two-door sedan (US)

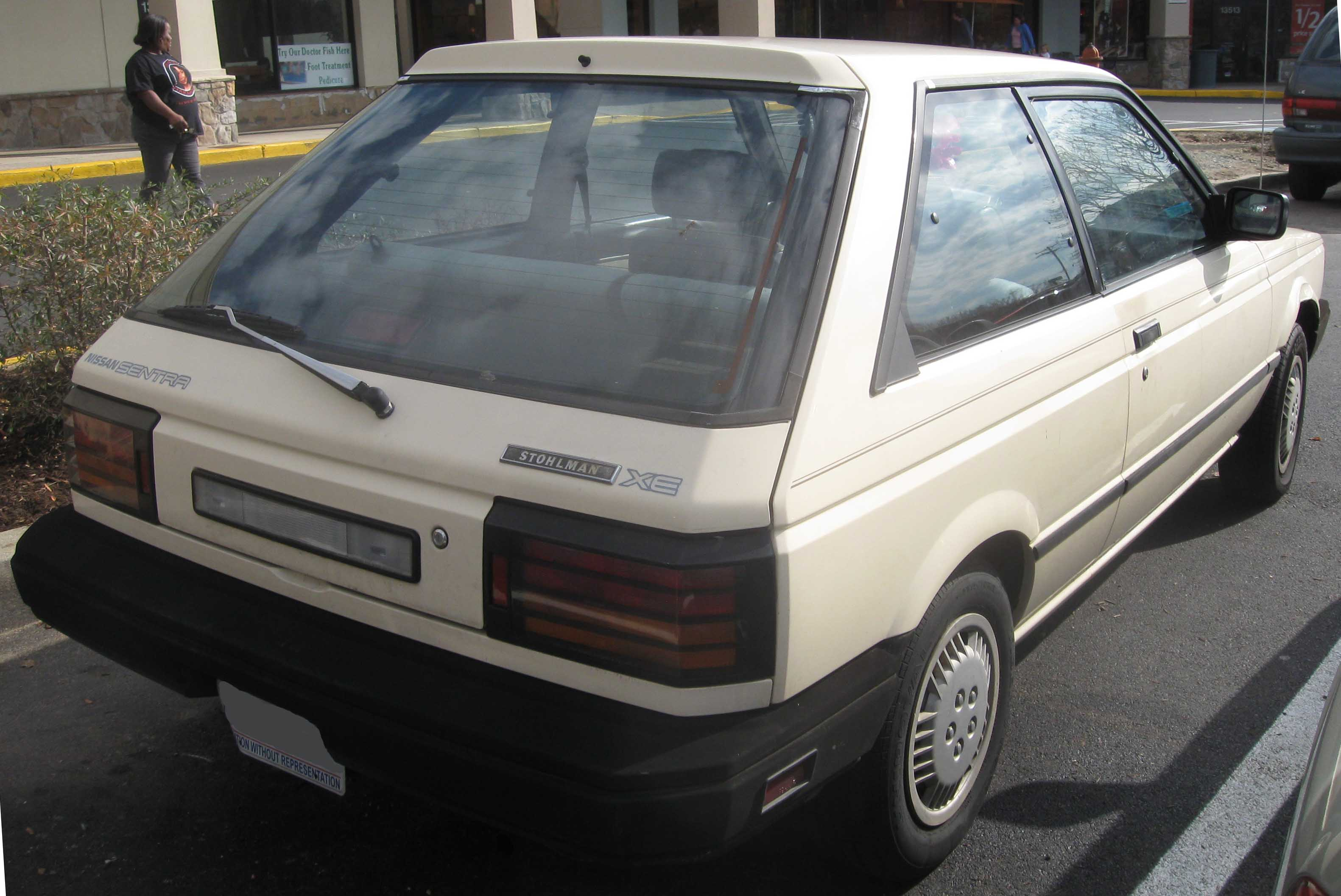
Nissan Sentra XE 3-door hatchback (US)

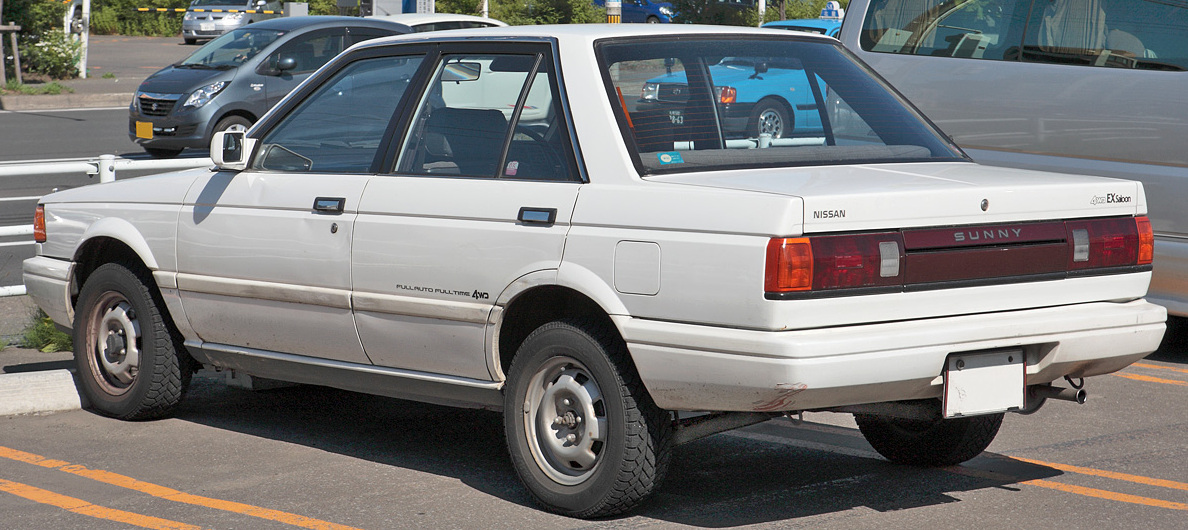
Nissan Sunny 4WD EX Saloon (Japan)

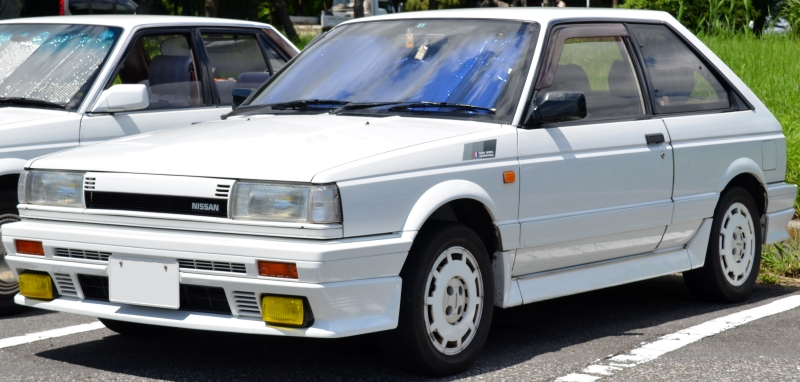
Nissan Sunny 305Re NISMO, 3-door (Japan)

=== Sentra ===
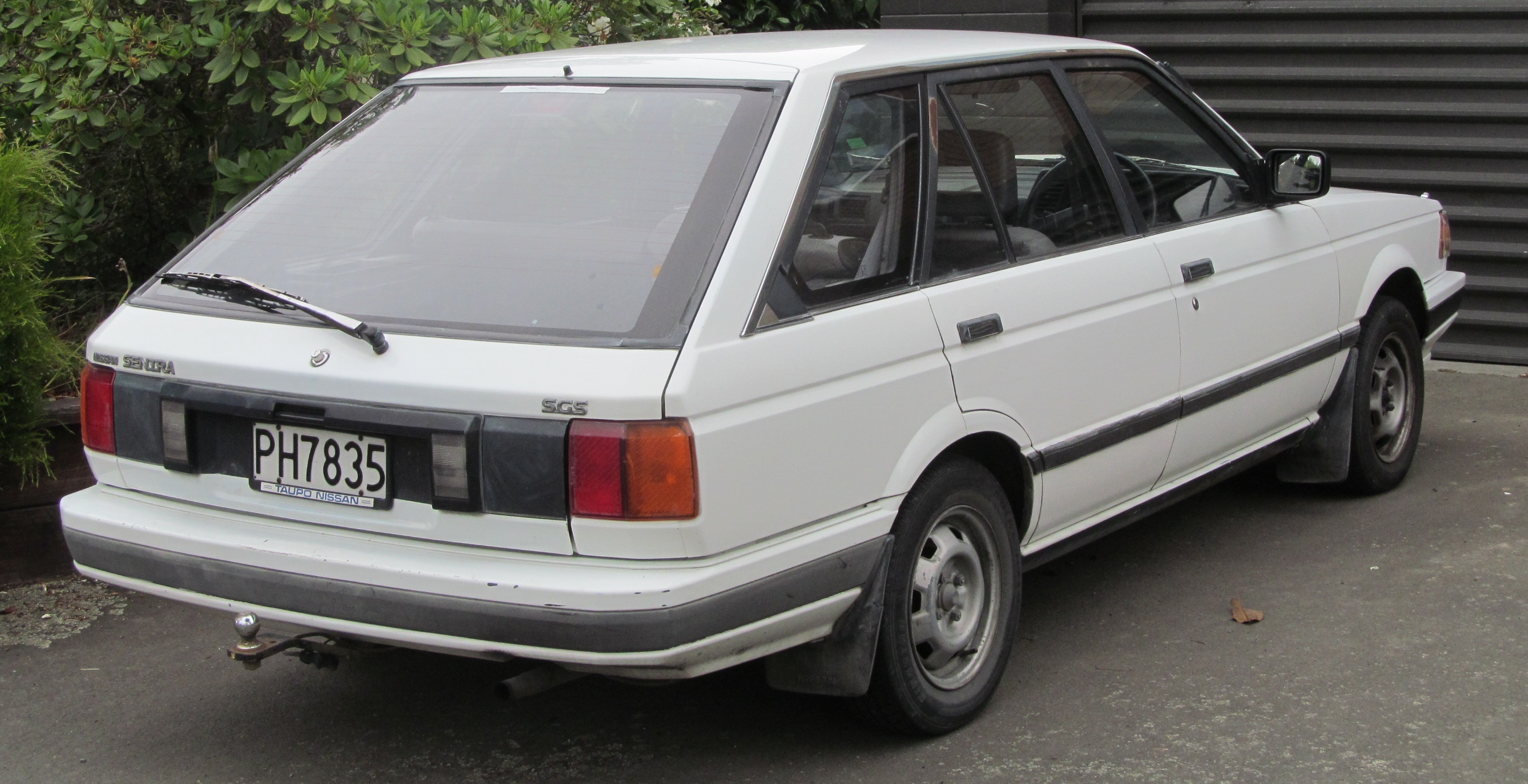
Nissan Sentra SGS Sportswagon (New Zealand)

The B12 series Sentra remained the mainstream C-segment Nissan in North America throughout its run, although the models available dwindled over the years. At launch, sedans were available in two-door base or XE or 4-door XE or GXE models, along with two trim levels each of the coupé and FWD wagon, a short-overhang three-door hatchback and an AWD wagon; by 1990 only one model each of the coupé, four-door sedan and FWD wagon, plus two two-door sedans (one with the same trim as the others and one extra-basic price leader) remained.

In Malaysia, it was known as the Nissan Sentra Super Saloon (early version) and came with the E16 engine. It was often used as a taxi and rental car. The B12 was replaced there by the Pulsar N13 in 1987. The Sentra badge was also used in a few other markets such as the Philippines and New Zealand.

=== Laurel Spirit ===
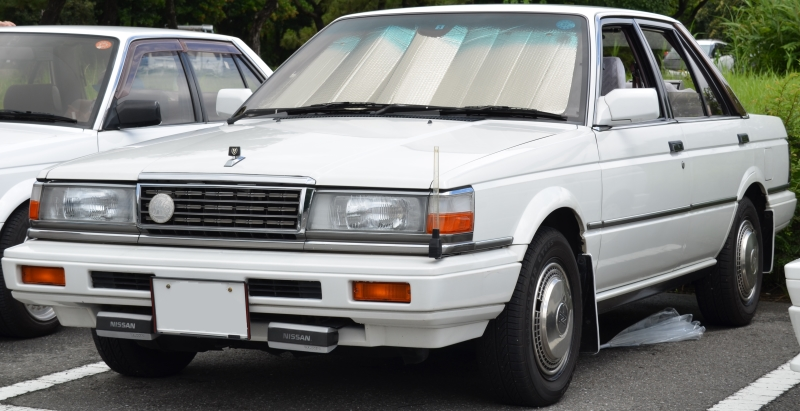
Nissan Laurel Spirit

In Japan, the Nissan Laurel Spirit continued to be offered at Nissan Store locations as a Sunny-based companion to the larger, more luxurious Nissan Laurel, with all-wheel-drive added to the Laurel Spirit's option list. The styling of the Laurel Spirit drew heavily from the larger Laurel, to further distance it from its more humble Sunny counterpart, and included the hood ornament from the Laurel to the smaller car. To help set it apart from its lower-priced brethren, the Laurel Spirit was only available with four-door bodywork in higher equipment levels, and not with the 1.3-litre engine.

=== Sunny RZ-1 (Coupé) ===
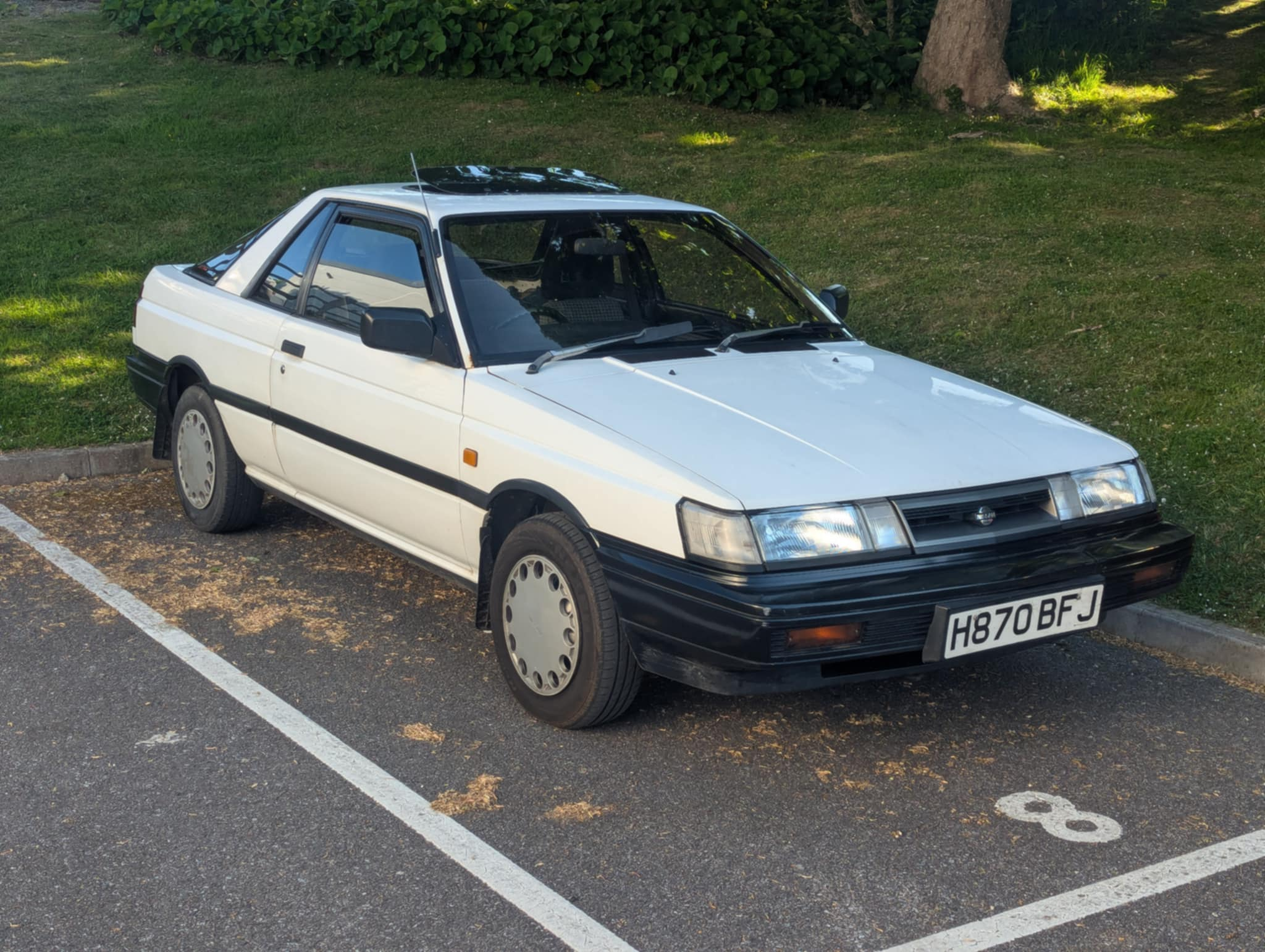
1990 Nissan Sunny Coupé GSX (UK)

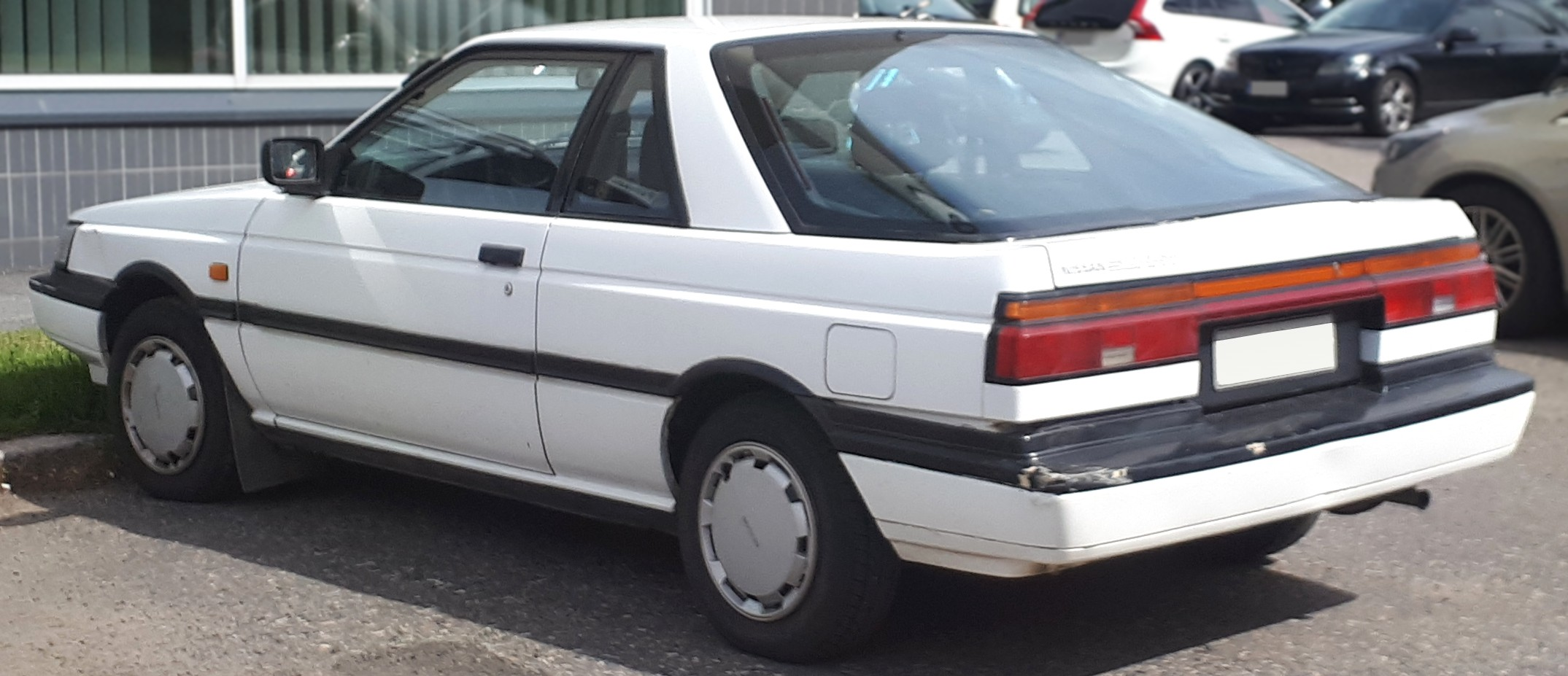
Nissan Sunny Coupé (Europe; rear)

In February 1986, Nissan introduced the Sunny RZ-1 coupé, with RZ representing "Runabout Zenith-1", as Nissan was already using the "Z" for its sports car, the Fairlady Z. The Sunny RZ-1 replaced the Sunny Turbo Leprix coupé. The RZ-1 was sold in Mexico as the Nissan Hikari, which is Japanese for "bright" or "sunny". It was marketed as a completely different model from the Tsuru (Sunny sedan) and it was Nissan's sports flagship car as it was even offered with a low-boost Turbo.

As with previous B series Sunny generations, the chassis was common with the wagon and sedan, with specific appearance to the RZ-1, while maintaining the traditional fastback associated with the Sunny Coupé. The Sunny hatchback and sedan were introduced with a square appearance, while the RZ-1 was more angular, with a more sharp appearance. The interior could only accommodate four people, with a black mask between the front headlights, retaining the strong slant angle, adding blistered front and rear over the wheels, and a wrapped around window treatment for the rear hatch, that had hit a different personality hatchback and sedan. The angular approach was also used on the Nissan EXA, which appeared internationally at the same time, and earlier on the Nissan Leopard.

Initially, the engines offered to Japanese customers were the E15S type (1500 cc straight-four SOHC), and the E15ET type (a turbocharged, fuel injected version of the same), but in August 1986 the CA16DE type (1600 cc straight-four DOHC) was added. Nissan introduced something called the "TWINCAM series" and the "TWINCAM NISMO", this included special suspension and aero parts that offered Japanese customers a customized specification, offering special interior appearances, including power windows that were not available on lower trim packages. In export markets it was mostly sold as the "Sunny Coupé", but export markets generally did not receive the higher trim packages available in Japan.

In Europe, the Sunny Coupé was also available with the larger, 125 PS (92 kW) 1.8-litre 16V twin cam CA18DE engine. In an unusual move, this was more powerful than any option available in Japan, where such a model was seen as a possible threat to sales of the Silvia series. A limited number were also manufactured in South Africa with this engine, carrying Sentra badging.

== Seventh generation (B13; 1990) ==
Nissan Sunny B13
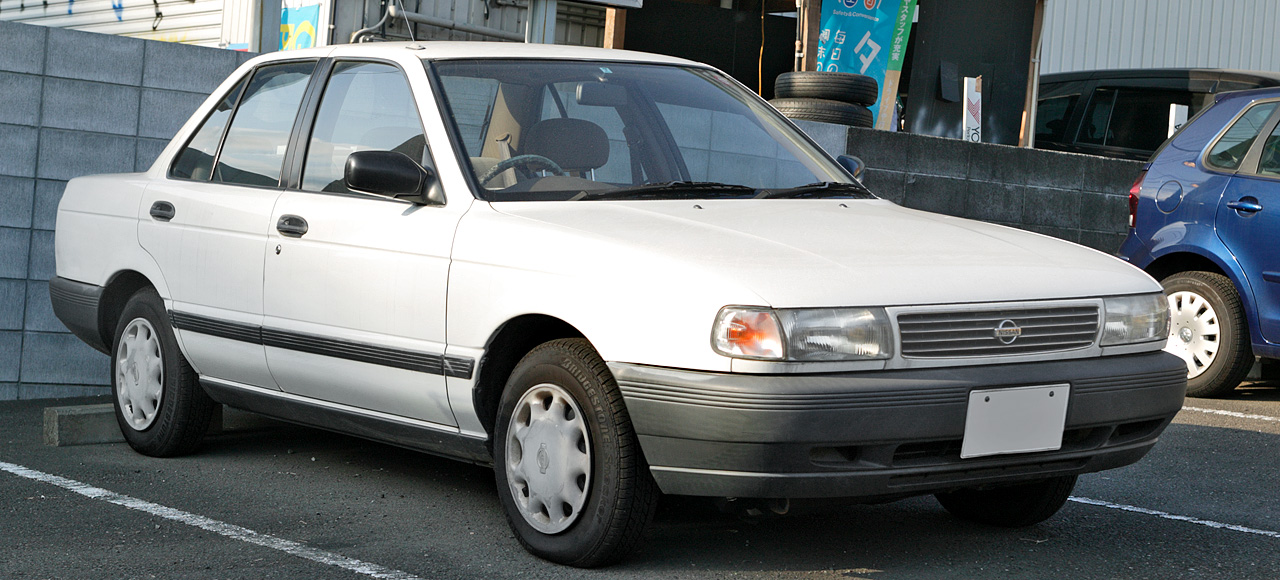
- 1992 Nissan Sunny 1300 JX (B13) in Japan

Overview
- Also called: Nissan Sentra (B13); Nissan Tsuru (Mexico); Nissan V16 (Chile, Peru)
- Production: 1990–1993; 1992–2017 (Mexico)
- Assembly: United States: Smyrna, Tennessee; Mexico: Cuernavaca, Morelos; Japan: Oppama Plant, Yokosuka, Kanagawa; Philippines: Makati (1991–1998); Philippines: Santa Rosa, Laguna (1998–1999); Malaysia: Kuala Lumpur; Taiwan: Miaoli

Body and chassis
- Body style: 2/4-door sedan
- Layout: FF; F4
- Related: Nissan Pulsar; Nissan Wingroad; Nissan AD; Nissan NX; Nissan Presea

Powertrain
- Engine: 1.3 L GA13DS I4 (B13); 1.4 L GA14DS/GA14DE I4; 1.5 L GA15DS I4 (FB13); 1.6 L GA16DS/GA16DE I4 (EB13); 1.8 L SR18DE I4 (HB13); 2.0 L SR20DE I4 (KB13); 1.7 L CD17 diesel I4 (SB13)
- Transmission: 5-speed manual; 4-speed automatic; 4-speed manual; 3-speed automatic

Dimensions
- Wheelbase: 2,431 mm (95.7 in); 2,430 mm (95.7 in) (Tsuru)
- Length: 4,326 mm (170.3 in); 4,325 mm (170.3 in) (Tsuru)
- Width: 1,669 mm (65.7 in) (1992–94); 1,666 mm (65.6 in) (1990–92); 1,369 mm (53.9 in) (coupé & 1990–92 sedan); 1,374 mm (54.1 in) (1992–94 sedan); 1,650 mm (65.0 in) (Tsuru)
- Height: 1,346 mm (53.0 in); 1,381 mm (54.4 in) (Tsuru)
- Curb weight: 2 door: 1,028 kg (2,266 lb); 4 door: 1,038 kg (2,288 lb)

The B13 was introduced in 1990 and retained much of the B12's design language and packaging but in a more rounded, up-to-date body. It was particularly successful in the United States where the sporting two-door Sentra SE-R was marketed by Nissan of America as a latter-day BMW 2002. The car continued in production in Mexico until 2017, where it was sold as "Tsuru", for domestic and export markets. The Tsuru was quite popular among cab drivers for its reliability and low maintenance costs. The Mexican-built Tsuru was exported to Chile and Peru, where it was sold as the Nissan V16 to distinguish it from the B11 and B12 which were both still available. In Taiwan, it is known as the Nissan 331. The Nissan Sunny California wagon was discontinued and replaced with the Wingroad, a small family wagon based on the Sunny AD commercial delivery van.

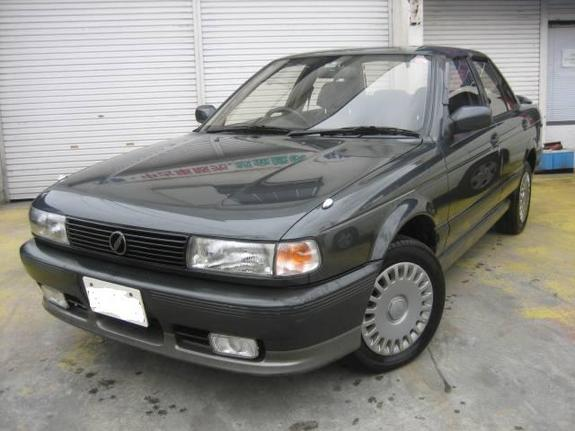
Nissan Sunny 1800 GTS

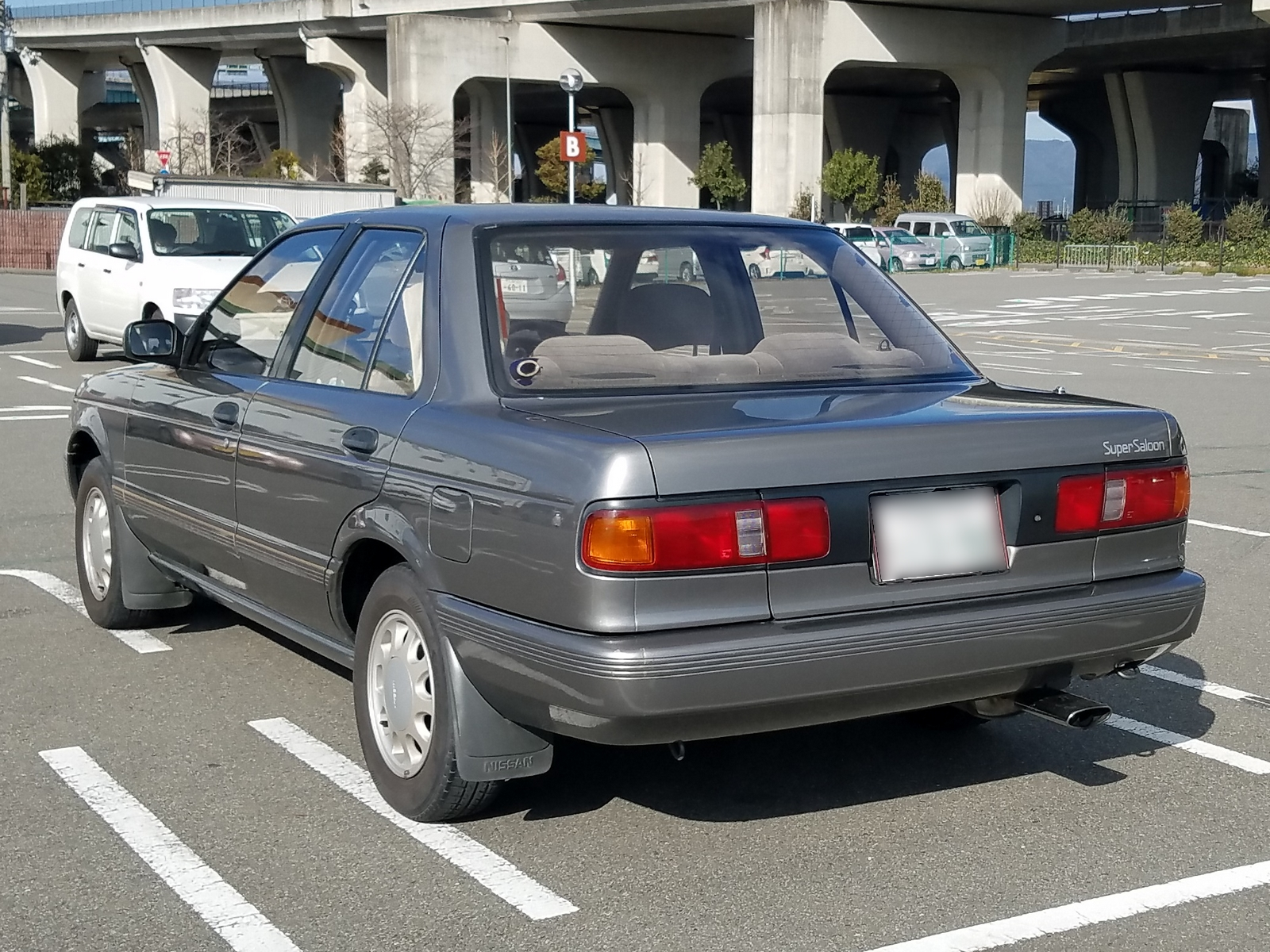
Nissan Sunny 1500 Super Saloon (rear)

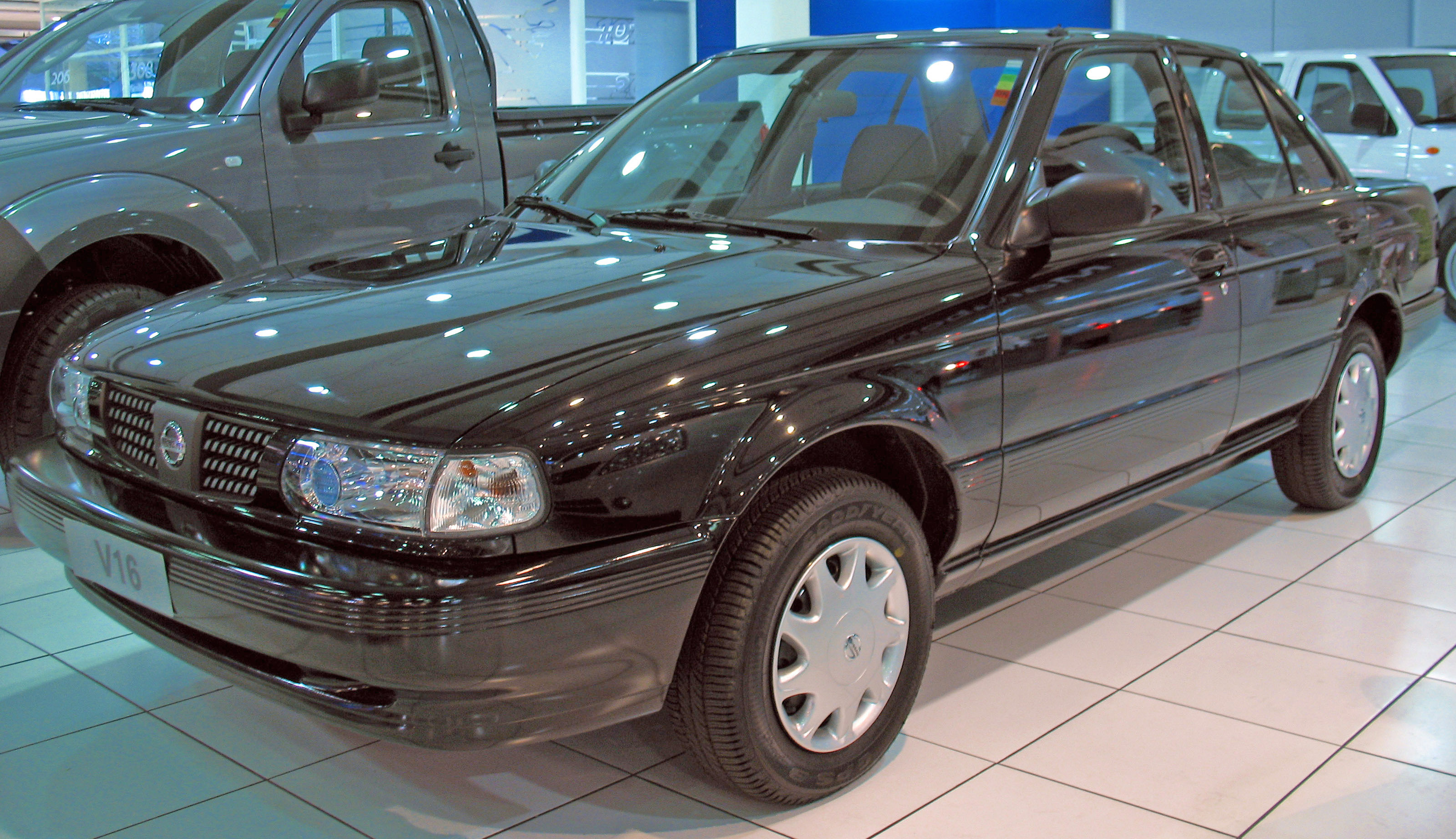
2010 Nissan V16; a Mexican-made B13 exported to Chile

In Mexico, the Nissan Tsuru was until 2017 the best-selling car in its category, as it is much bigger and has cheaper maintenance than its direct competitors: the Pointer and the Chevrolet Chevy C2. The 2007 model was available in two trims; GS 1 (base) and GS 2. Both trims use a 1.6-litre 16-valve (GA16DNE) engine producing 105 hp (78 kW) and can be equipped with an automatic gear-box and air-conditioning (Tsuru GS 2). A new Nissan Tsuru GS 1 costed approximately US$9,500. It was discontinued in May 2017, due to the car not being compliant with new Mexican car safety regulations. A special edition called Buen Camino was sold to celebrate the end of the Tsuru in Mexico. According to Nissan, there are no plans for a successor for the Tsuru, with the Versa being sold as a 2018 model as its successor.

In Malaysia it was known as the Sentra Super Saloon and was offered in two version, both fitted with the GA16DE engine.

In Japan, the Laurel Spirit was renamed the Presea, continuing to be a luxury-based Sunny companion to the Laurel, both exclusive to Nissan Store locations.

The Sunny Sports Coupé was replaced by the ovoid NX internationally.

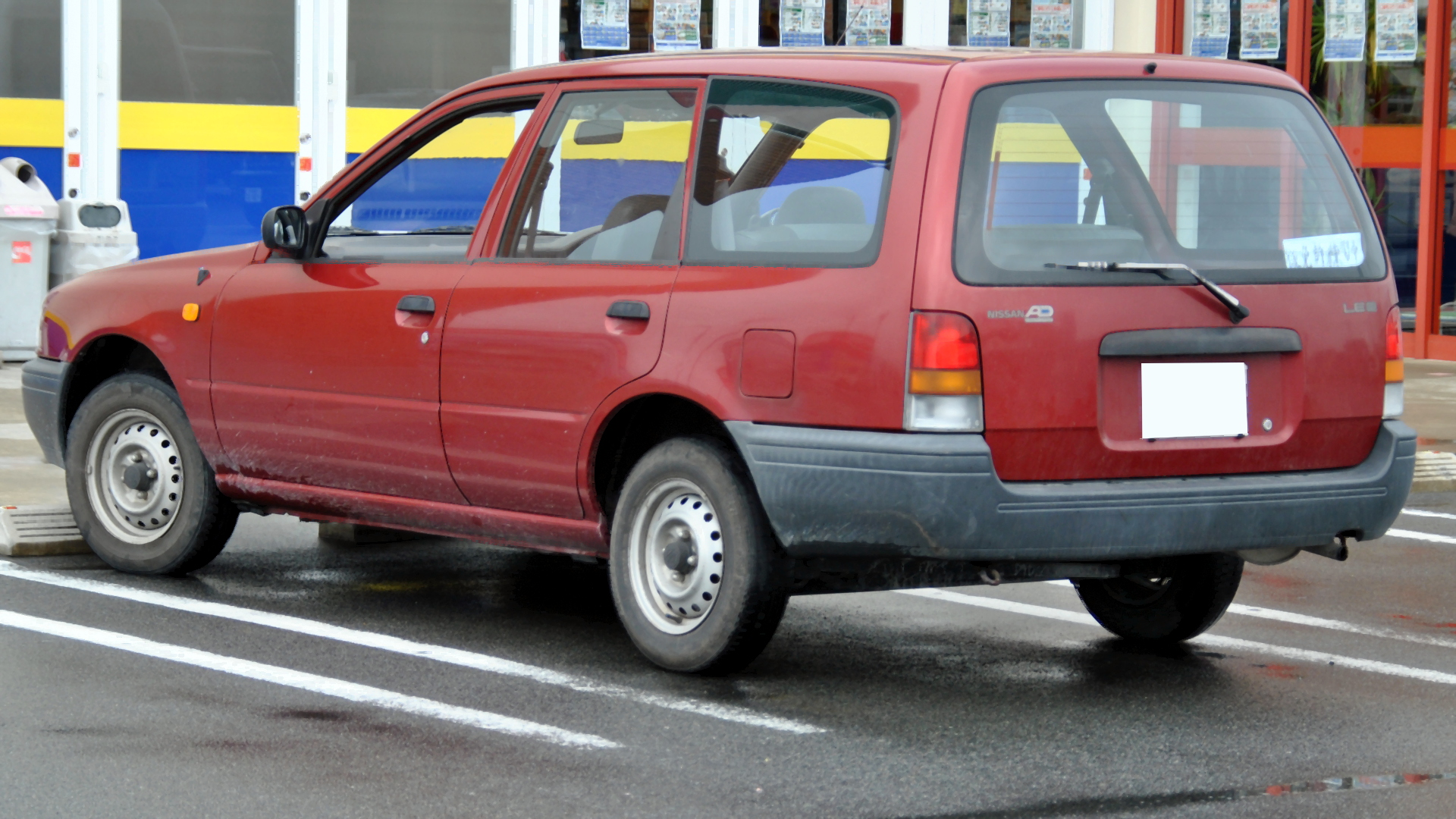
The AD Wagon remained available. This was sold as the Sunny Traveller/wagon in Europe and as Nissan Tsubame in Mexico.

== Eighth generation (B14; 1993) ==
Nissan Sunny B14 series
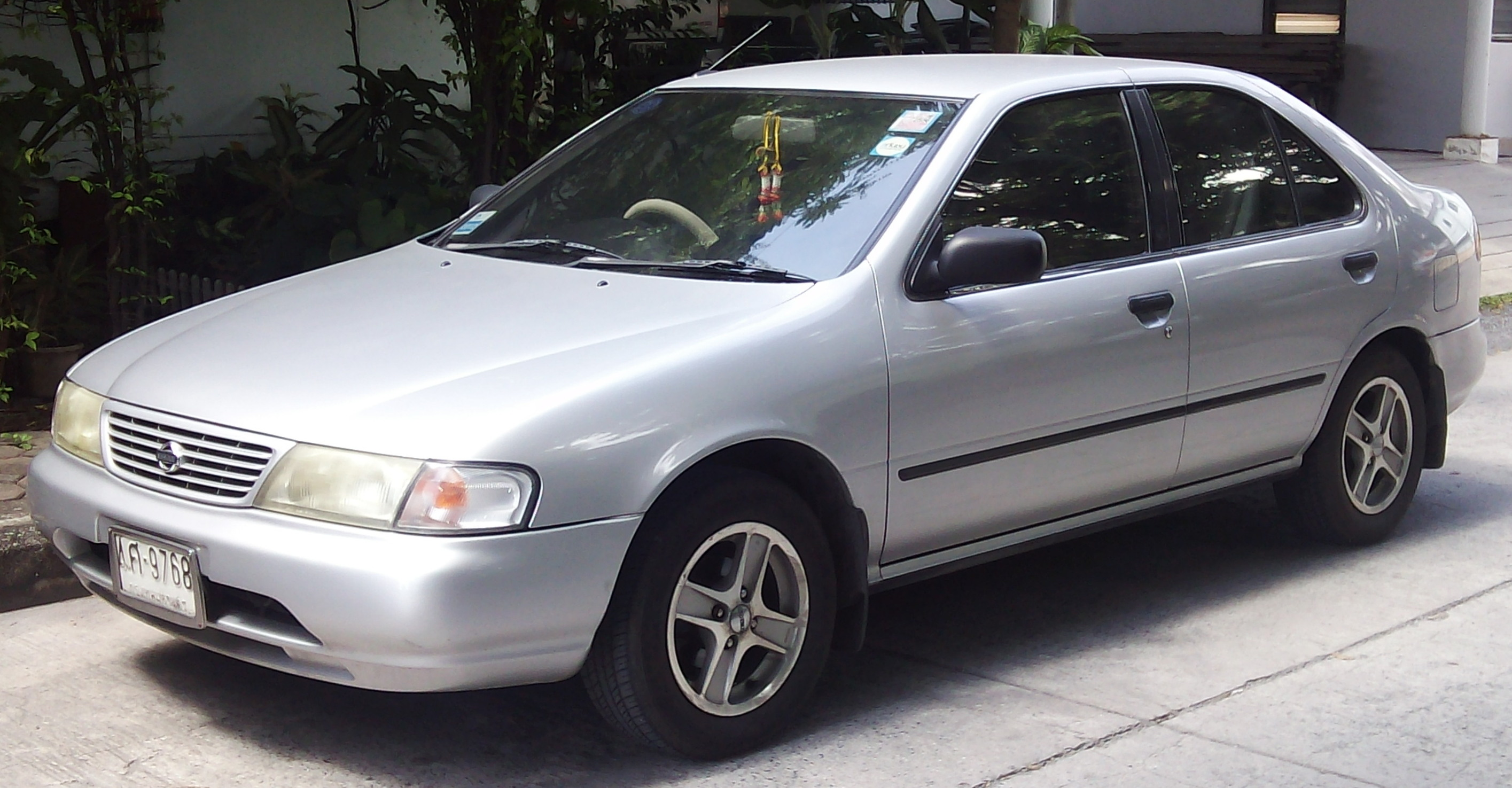
- 1995 Nissan Sunny EX Saloon (pre-facelift, Thailand)

Overview
- Also called: Saibeijian Sunny (China)
- Production: 1993–1998 (Japan); 1995–2002 (Philippines)
- Assembly: Japan: Oppama Plant, Yokosuka, Kanagawa; United States: Smyrna, Tennessee; Mexico: Aguascalientes; Philippines: Makati (1995–1998); Philippines: Santa Rosa, Laguna, (1998–2002); Malaysia: Kuala Lumpur

Body and chassis
- Body style: 4-door sedan
- Layout: FF layout
- Related: Nissan Sentra (B14); Nissan Lucino; Nissan Pulsar (N15); Nissan Rasheen; Nissan Presea

Powertrain
- Engine: Petrol: 1.3 L GA13DS/DE I4 (B14); 1.4 L GA14DS/DE I4; 1.5 L GA15DE I4 (FB14); 1.6 L GA16DE/DNE I4 (EB14); 1.6 L SR16VE I4 (JB14); 1.8 L SR18DE I4 (HB14); 2.0 L SR20DE I4 (KB14); Diesel: 2.0 L CD20 I4 (SB14)
- Transmission: 5-speed manual; 4-speed automatic

Dimensions
- Wheelbase: 2,535 mm (99.8 in)
- Length: 4,250–4,340 mm (167.3–170.9 in)
- Width: 1,690 mm (66.5 in)
- Height: 1,385–1,410 mm (54.5–55.5 in)

The B14 Sunny and Sentra appeared in December 1993 and were produced until 1998, and featured four-wheel-drive variants. Other than Japan, this variant was produced in Karachi, Pakistan through a joint venture between Ghandhara Nissan and Nissan Japan until 2004 for the local and some export markets.

In this generation, the station wagon was supplied to Mazda under an OEM deal as the Familia Van. The Nissan Wingroad range appeared as a spin-off of the Sunny line in Japan, denoting a highly specified station wagon that replaced the Nissan Sunny California. Both the Familia and the Wingroad had different front and rear ends compared to the wagon that was exported. The luxury version of the Sunny, called the Presea, continued to be offered at Nissan Store Japanese dealerships.

Nissan Mexico sold versions of this as the Sentra with a 1.6 engine GA16DE from 1995 to 1997, GA16DNE from 1998 to 2000 and 2.0 engine (SR20DE) in the GSS version (top of the line). Asian market cars, including Middle East nations, were also available with the 1.4-litre GA14DE engine.

Thailand and other selected Asian countries had this model of B14 from 1994 until 2000 with a few minor changes along the way. First minor change shows when the rear changes to split the red strip into two sides, next the face changes in a few years with a small ridge in the middle of the hood and a chromium decoration on the hood tip, finally the last minor change, the tail light style changes from two layers of white/red to be the three layers red/white/red. The two variants of engines are either 1.5 (in the first generation) or 1.6 litres' displacement (available only after some minor changes).

All models were equipped with multi-link beam suspension for the rear.

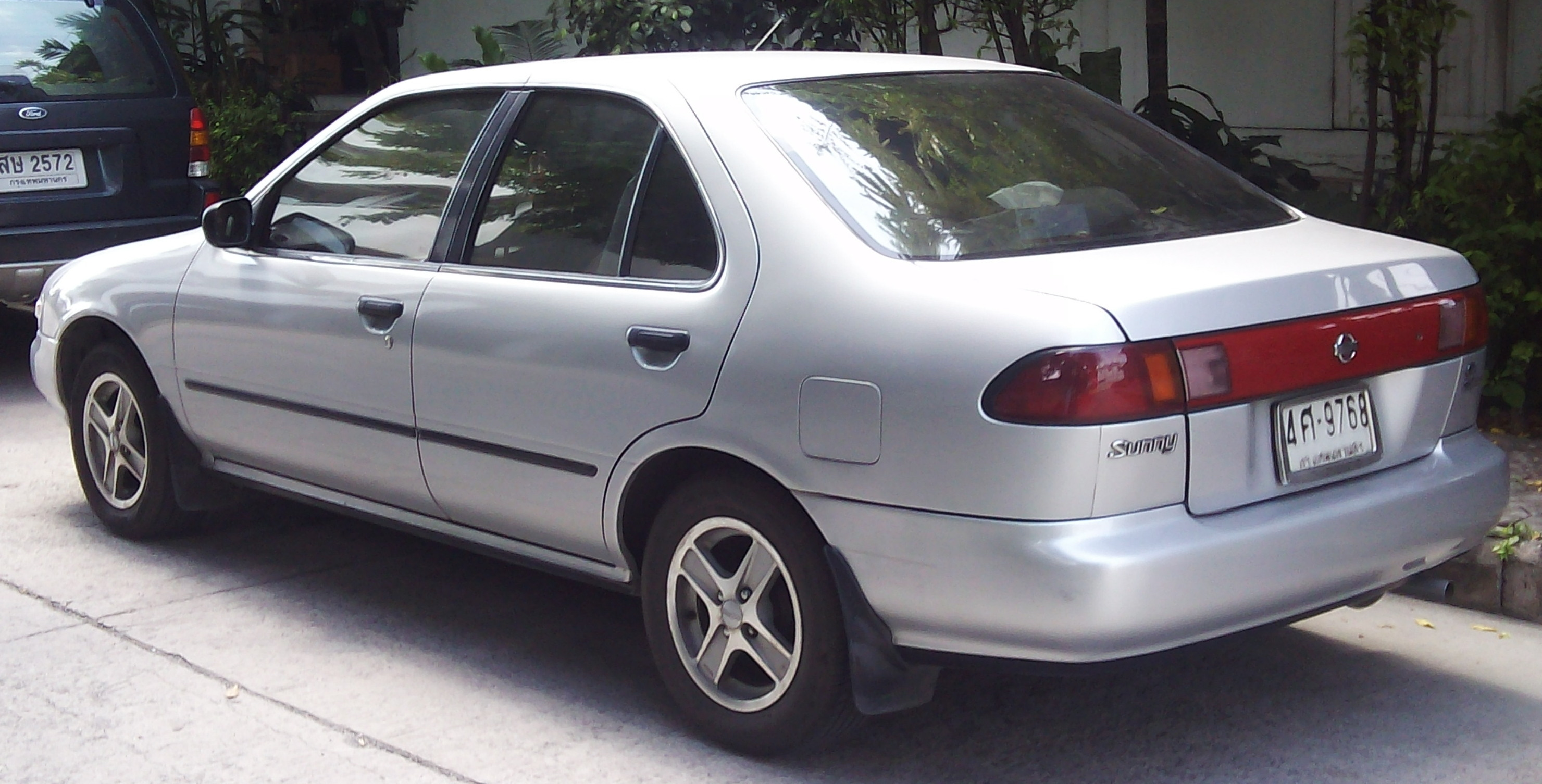
1995 Nissan Sunny EX Saloon (pre-facelift, Thailand)

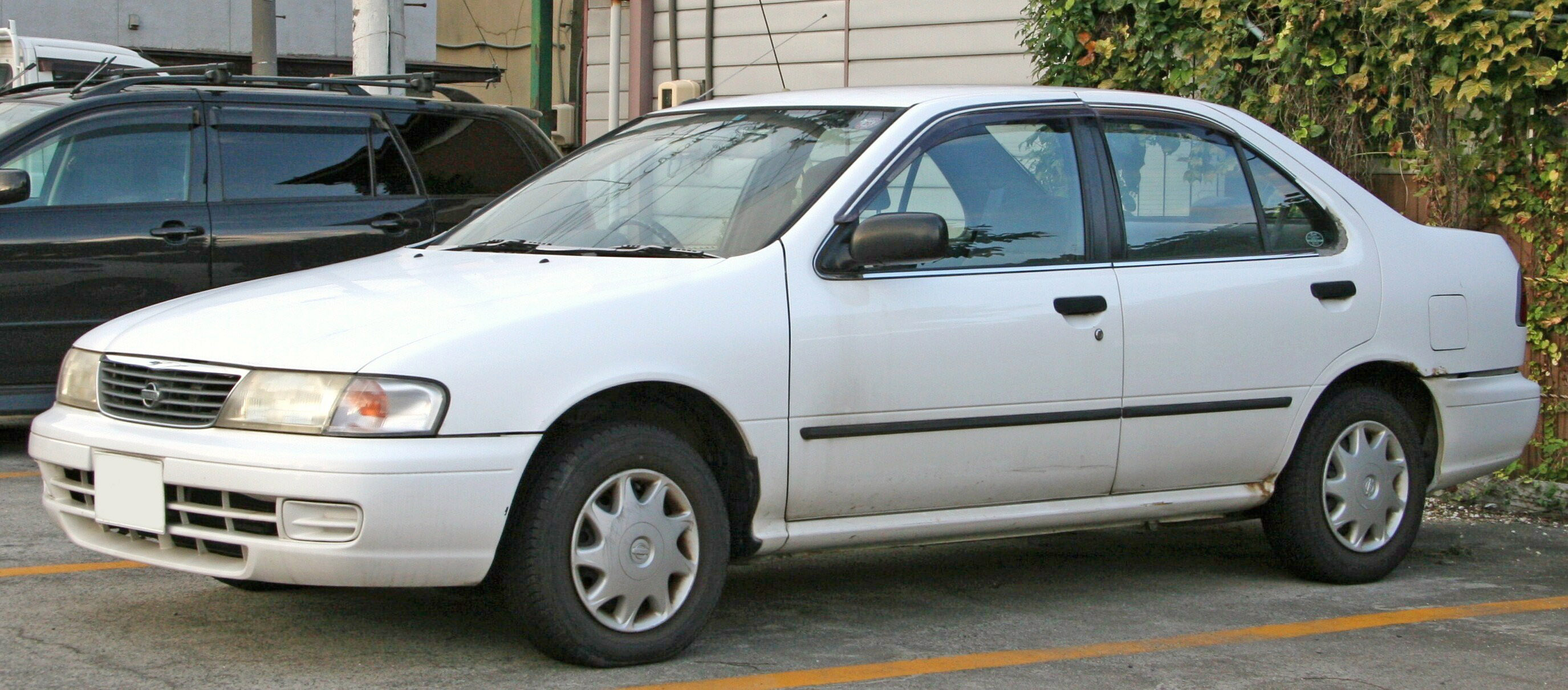
1995–1997 Nissan Sunny EX Saloon (first facelift, Japan)

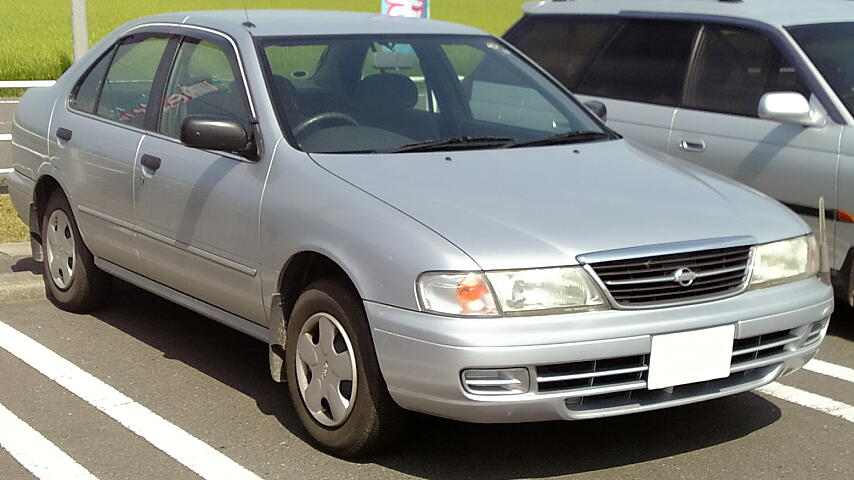
1997–1998 Nissan Sunny EX Saloon (first facelift, Japan)

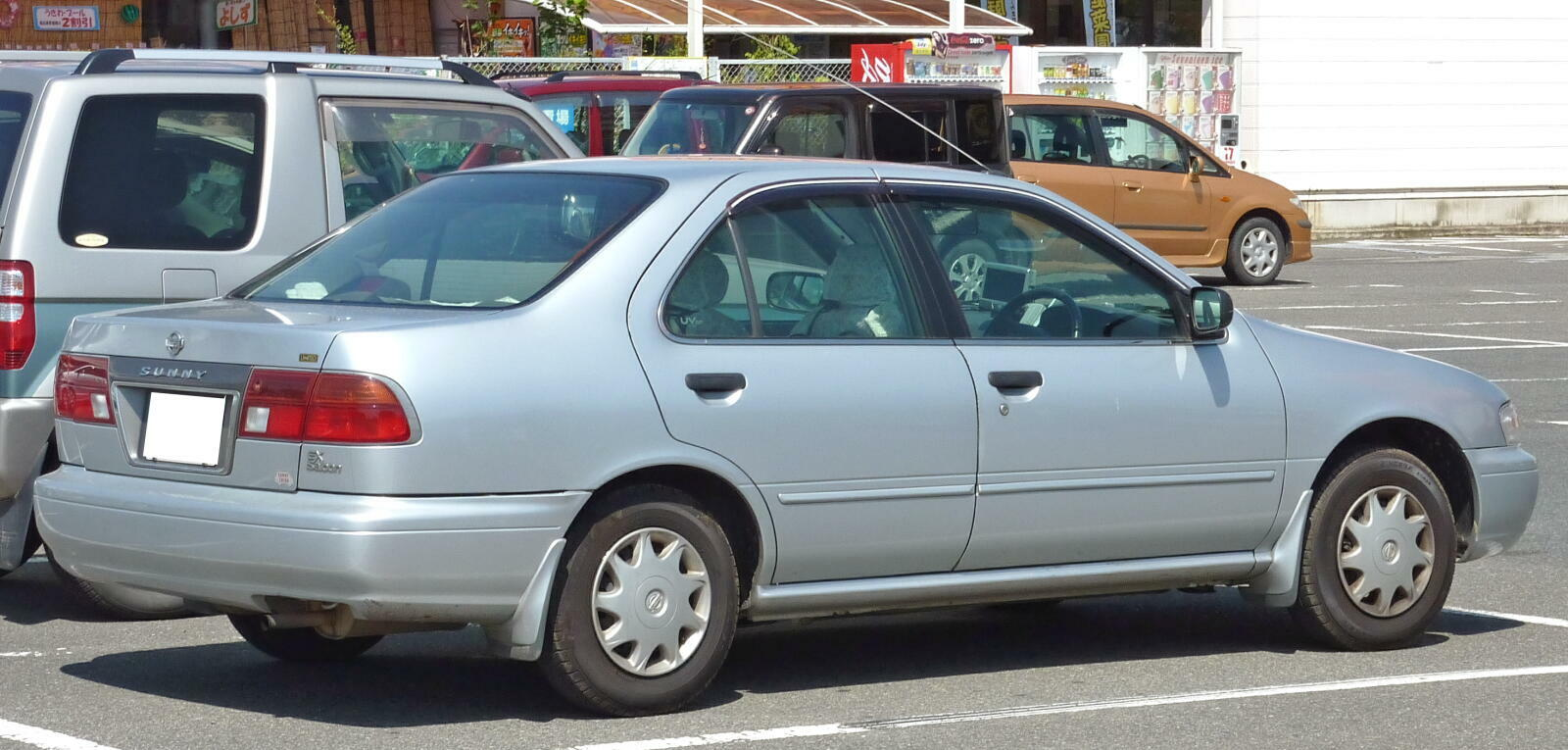
1997–1998 Nissan Sunny EX Saloon (first facelift, Japan)

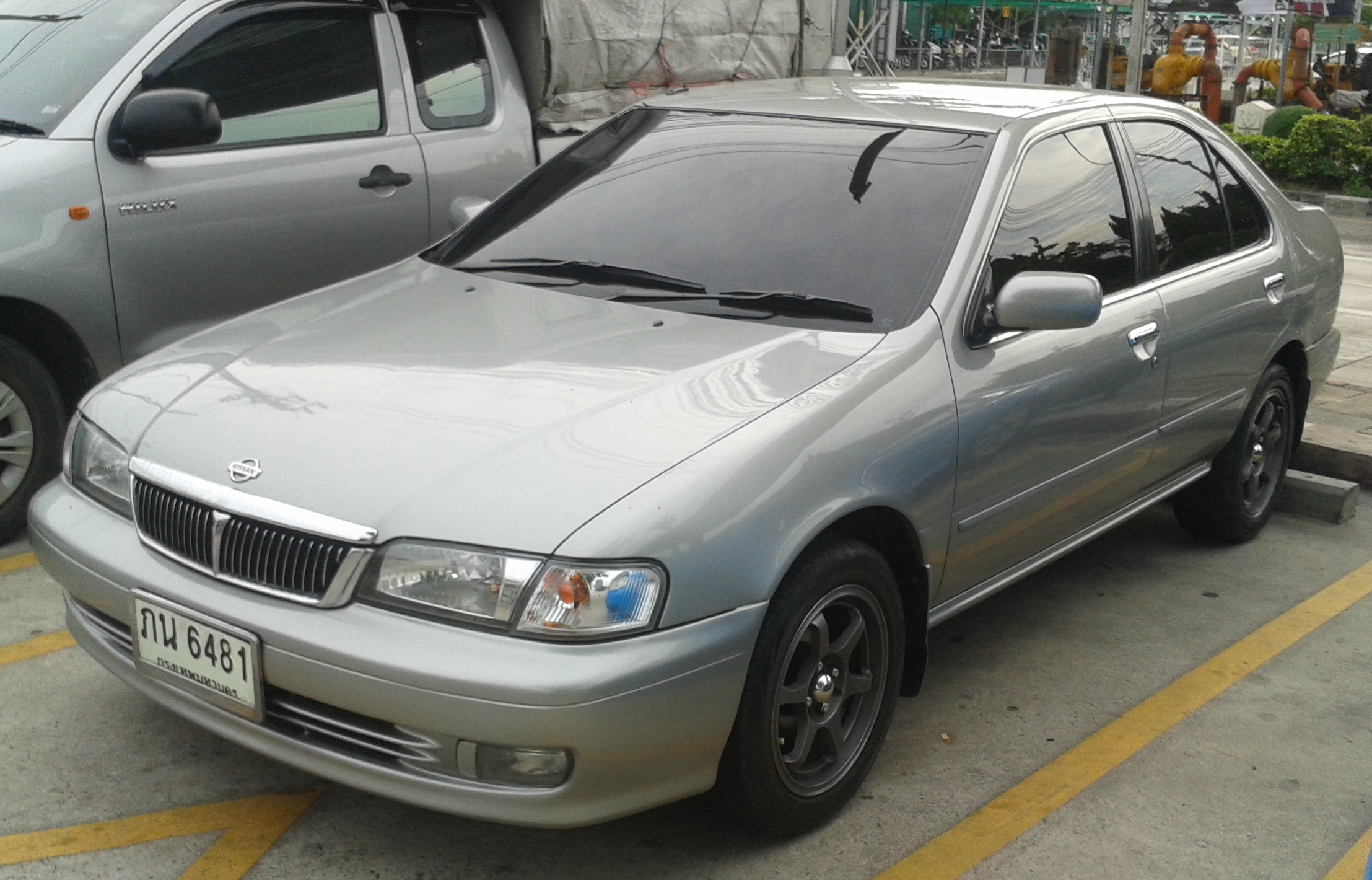
1998–2000 Nissan Sunny Super Saloon (second facelift, Thailand)

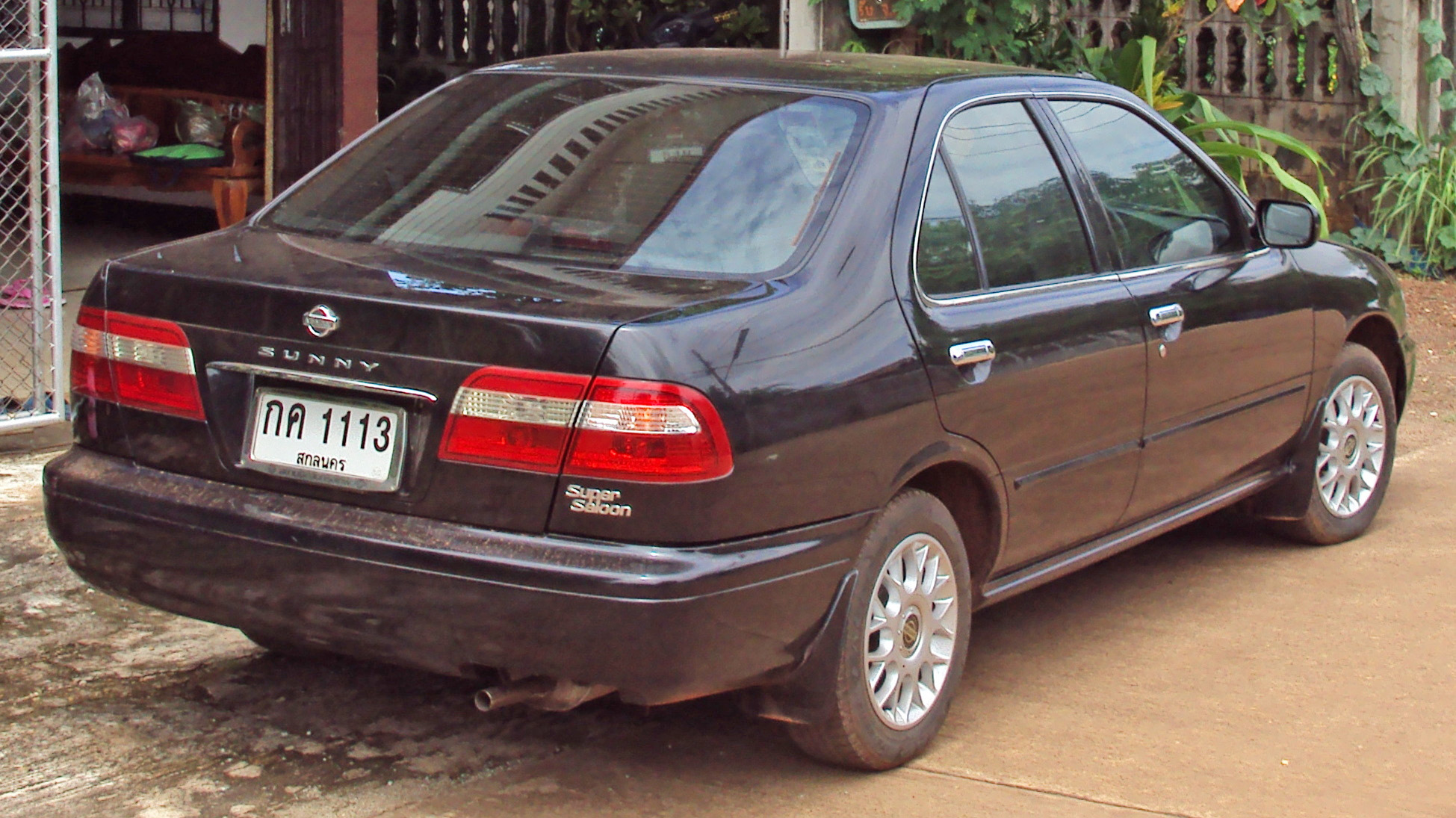
1998–2000 Nissan Sunny Super Saloon (second facelift, Thailand) with Taiwanese market tail lights

=== Nissan Lucino ===
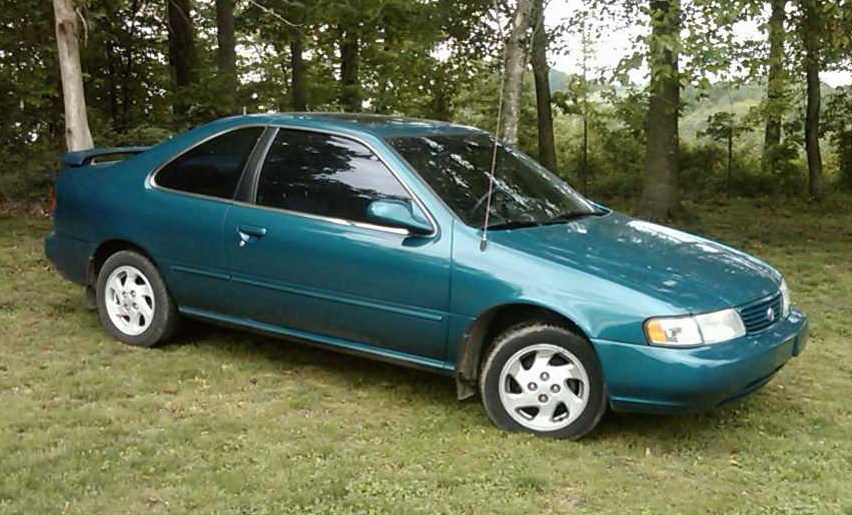
Nissan 200SX

In 1995, Nissan reintroduced the 200SX nameplate in United States and Canada to designate a two-door version of the Sentra (B14 chassis, a front wheel drive car), known in Japan and Mexico as Lucino, replacing the Sentra coupé and NX (discontinued in 1993). The 200SX came in base, SE, and sportier SE-R models. All shared their front-end appearance, front-drive chassis, dashboard, and many dimensions with the Sentra and Japanese-market Lucino. Base and SE editions shared the Sentra's twin-cam GA16DE engine four-cylinder engine. The SE-R inherited the 140-horsepower 2.0 L SR20DE engine used in the previous 2-door Sentra SE-R. All three came with a 5-speed manual transmission or 4-speed automatic, and were equipped with dual airbags. Antilock brakes were optional in the SE and SE-R.

== Ninth generation (B15; 1998) ==
Nissan Sunny B15 series
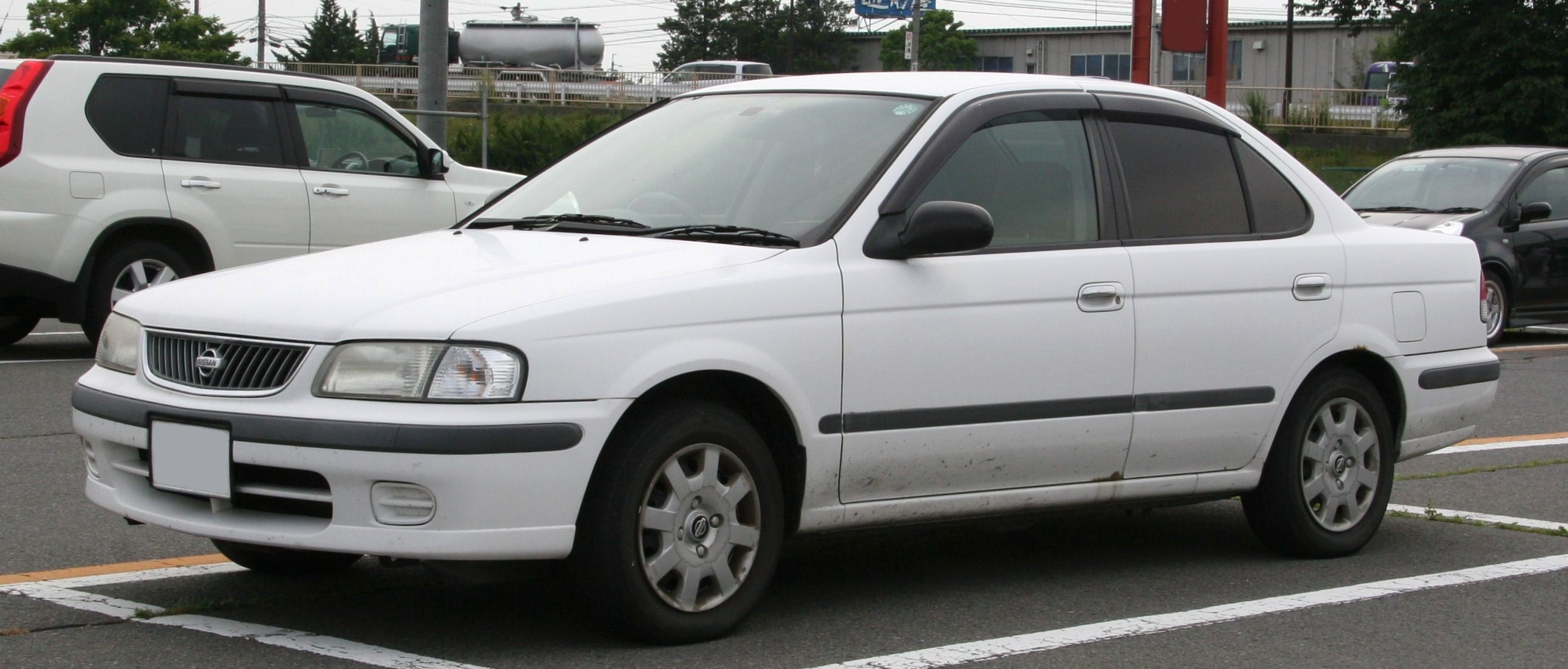
- Nissan Sunny EX Saloon (pre-facelift, Japan)

Overview
- Production: 1998–2004
- Assembly: Japan: Oppama Plant, Yokosuka, Kanagawa

Body and chassis
- Body style: 4-door sedan
- Layout: FF; F4 (1.5 L only)
- Platform: Nissan MS platform
- Related: Nissan Sentra (B15); Nissan Bluebird Sylphy (G10/N16); Nissan Almera (N16); Nissan AD/Wingroad (Y11)

Powertrain
- Engine: Petrol: 1.3 L QG13DE I4 (B15); 1.5 L QG15DE I4 (FB15); 1.6 L SR16VE I4 (JB15); 1.8 L QG18DD I4 (QB15); Diesel: 2.2 L YD22DD I4 (SB15)
- Transmission: 5-speed manual; 4-speed automatic; CVT (1.8 L only)

Dimensions
- Wheelbase: 2,535 mm (99.8 in)
- Length: 4,345–4,360 mm (171.1–171.7 in)
- Width: 1,695 mm (66.7 in)
- Height: 1,415–1,425 mm (55.7–56.1 in) (FWD); 1,445 mm (56.9 in) (AWD)
- Curb weight: 1,060–1,230 kg (2,337–2,712 lb)

The B15 series was the last Sunny, produced from October 1998 to the end of 2004. A facelift with a larger grille with more chrome was launched in May 2002. In 2004 in Japan, the Nissan Tiida (C11) and Nissan Bluebird Sylphy (G11) replaced the Sunny, marking the end of an almost 40-year life for the nameplate.

While earlier North American-market Nissan Sentras were very similar to their Japan-market B-series Nissan Sunny twins, the B15 Sentra (2000–2006) is diverged greatly from the B15 Sunny. The Sentra B15 took styling cues from the Nissan Bluebird Sylphy (G10/N16), while the Sunny B15 body had a more traditional squared-off three-box sedan design.

In Japan, the B15 Sunny was offered with 1.3, 1.5, 1.6, and 1.8-litre petrol or 2.2-litre diesel engines. In North America, the B15 Sentra was offered with 1.8, 2.0 and 2.5-litre engines, and carried on the B-series Sunny/Sentra lineage with the B16 Sentra.

The AD Van and Wingroad station wagon (and their badge engineered derivative, the Mazda Familia Van) continued to be spun off from the main Sunny range. These were offered with 1.3, 1.5, and 1.8-litre petrol engines, plus a 2.2-litre diesel option. A facelift for the AD/Wingroad in 2002 gave it a new front end treatment, though the rear was much the same. The two-door variant was discontinued.

Renault Samsung Motors, a South Korean Automaker planned to use this vehicle for their R-Car project. However, Renault acquired Samsung Motors and announced that the R-Car would be rebranded as the SM3, although it ended up being based on the related Nissan Bluebird Sylphy.

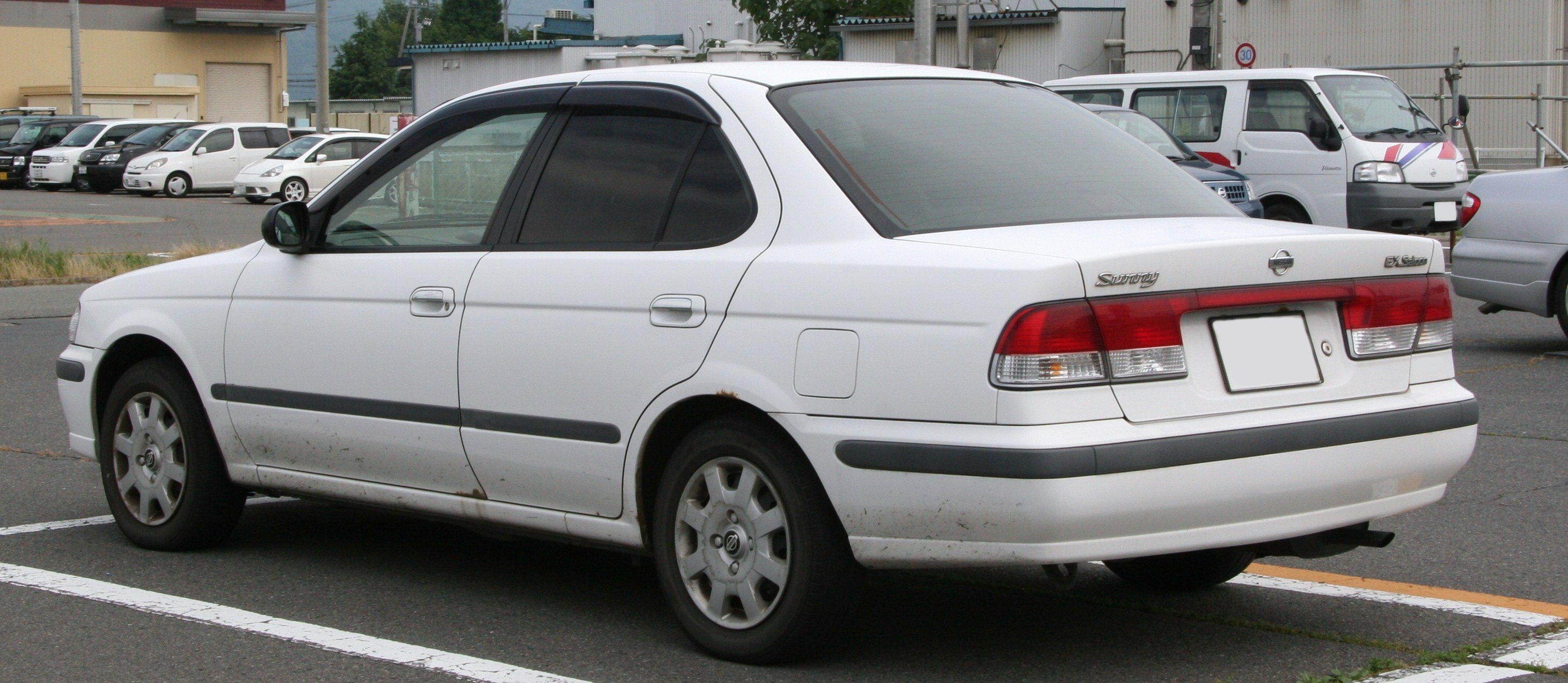
Nissan Sunny EX Saloon (pre-facelift, Japan)

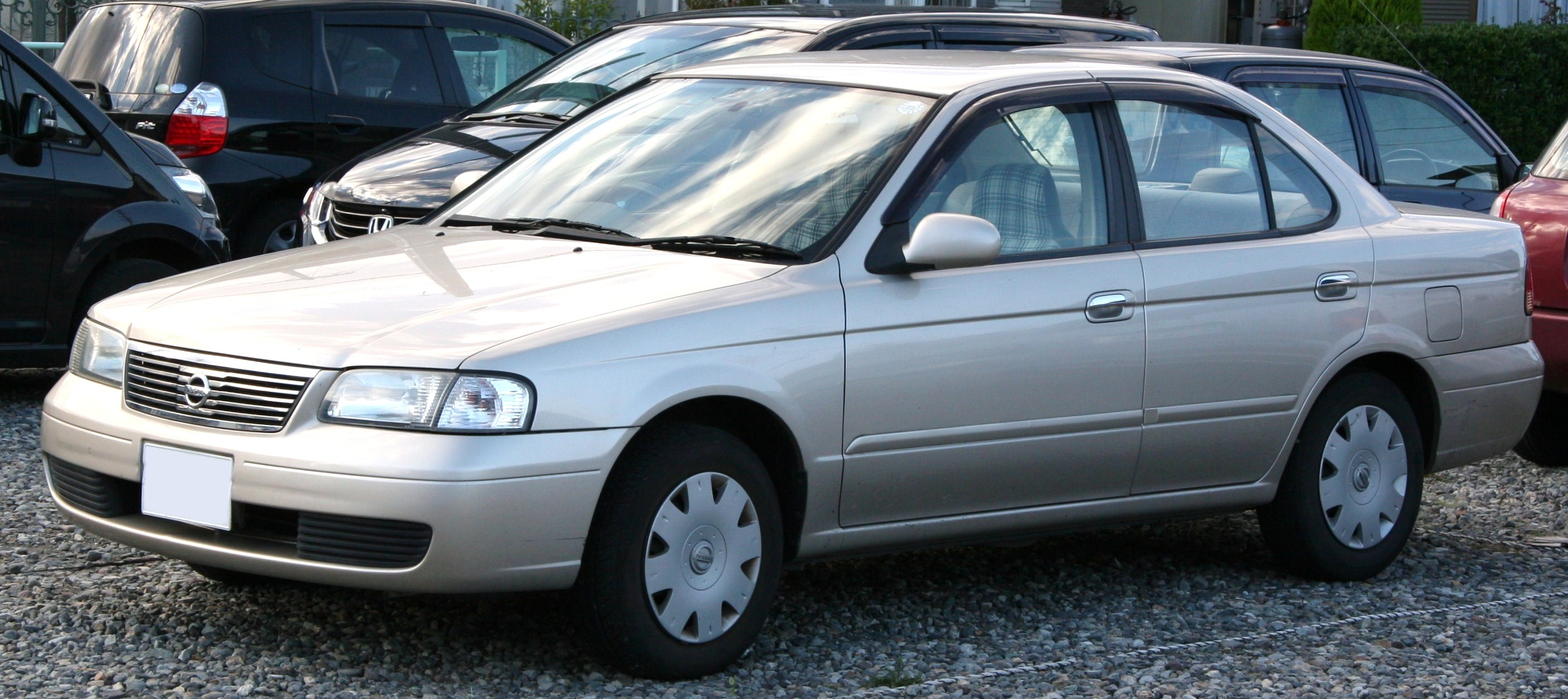
Nissan Sunny (facelift, Japan)

== Other versions ==
Although the Nissan Pulsar and Bluebird Sylphy ranges (N-series family) were a separate model line with different heritage from Sunny (B-series family), for various reasons the Sunny name was—in some markets—applied to various Pulsar/Sylphy vehicles.

=== N13 (1987–1991) ===
The Nissan Sunny name was used on the Nissan Pulsar (N13) in Europe from 1987 to 1991, which was introduced as a replacement for both the Nissan Sunny B11 Sunny and N12 Cherry.

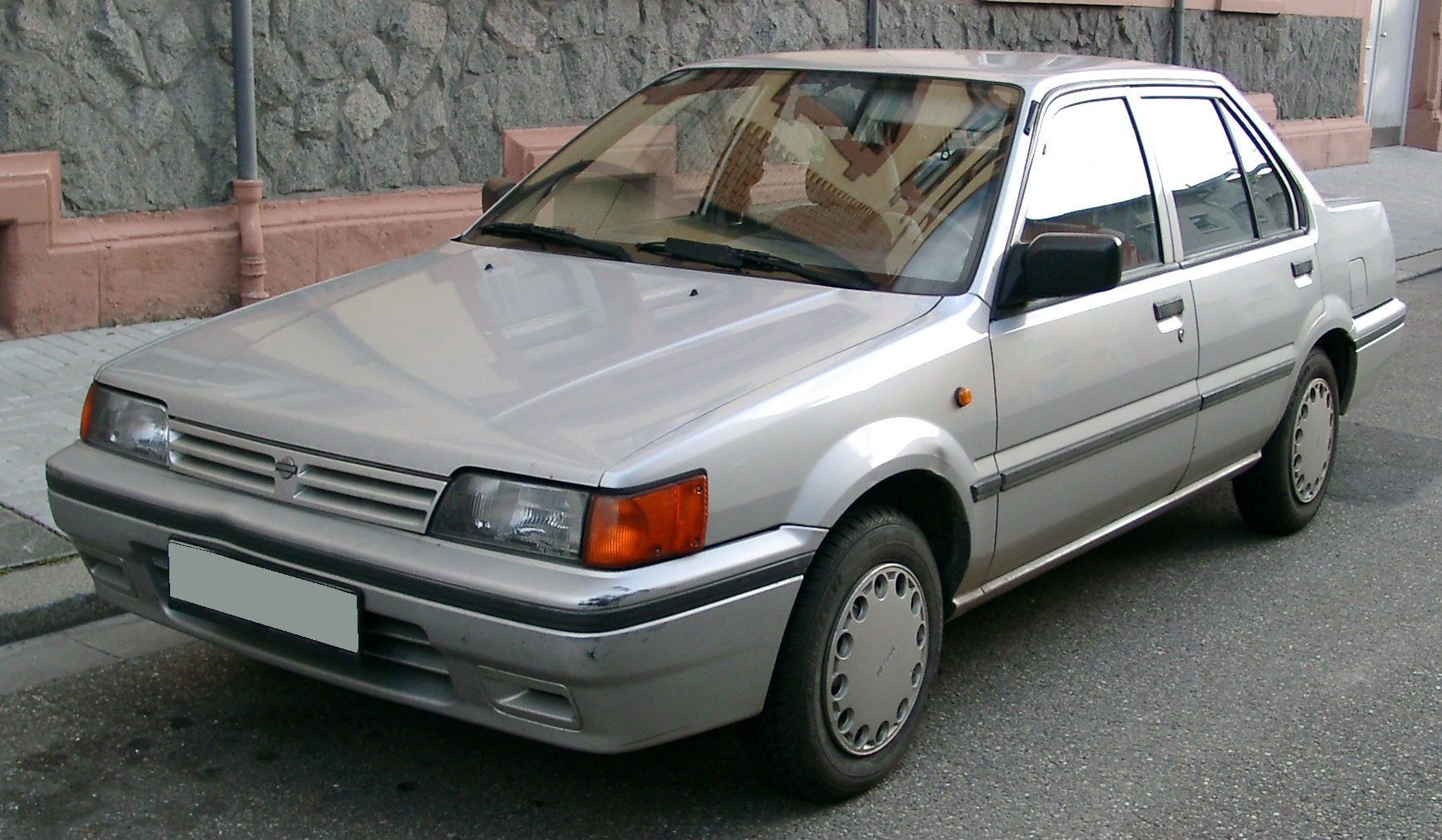
Nissan Sunny (N13; 1987–1991)

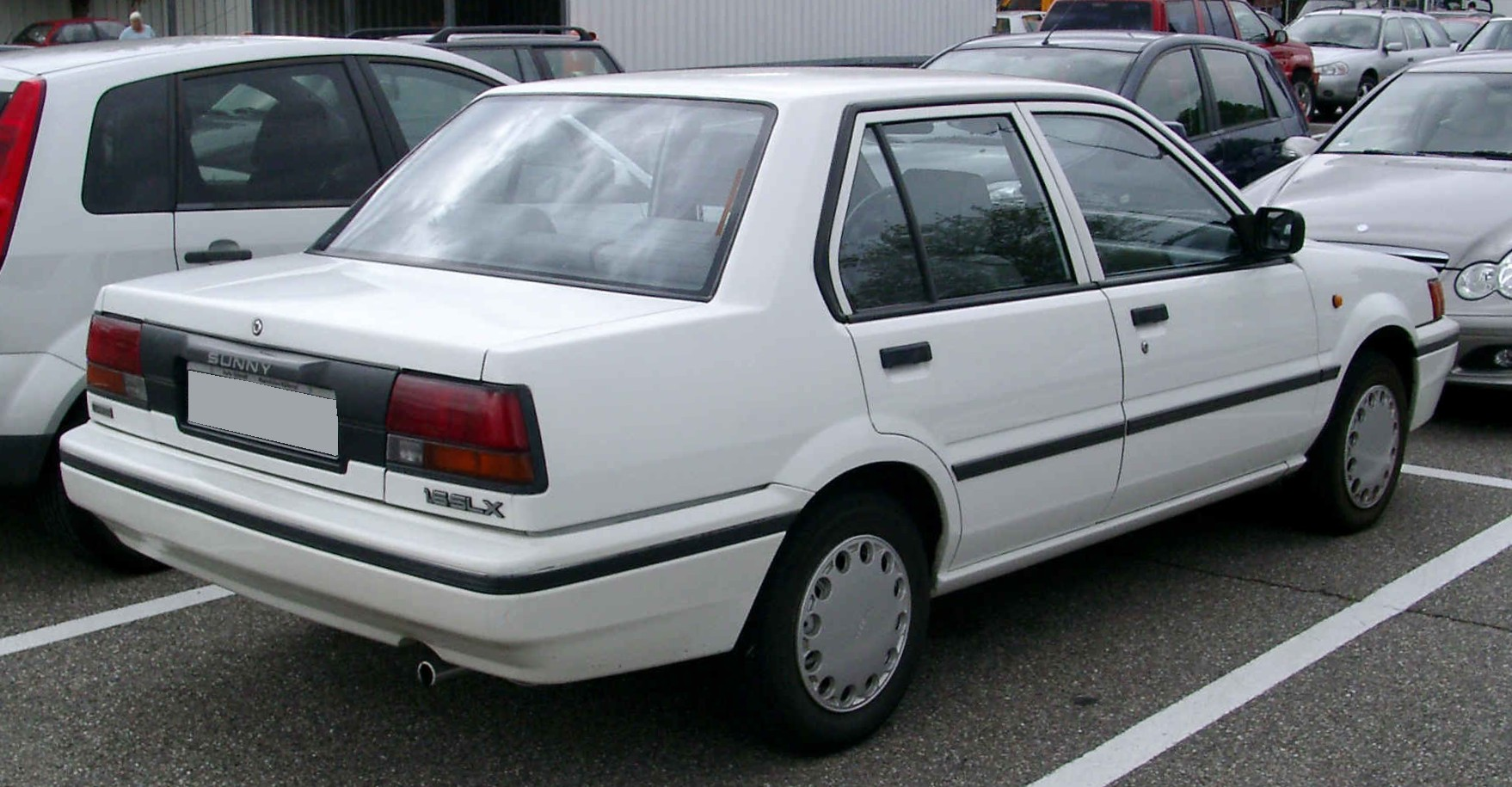
Nissan Sunny (N13; 1987–1991)

=== N14 (1991–1995) ===
The Nissan Pulsar N14 series was introduced in 1990 in Japan and in 1991 for Europe, badged as the Nissan Sunny. It was replaced by the Nissan Almera N15 in 1995 which was itself a rebadged version of the Nissan Pulsar N15 series.

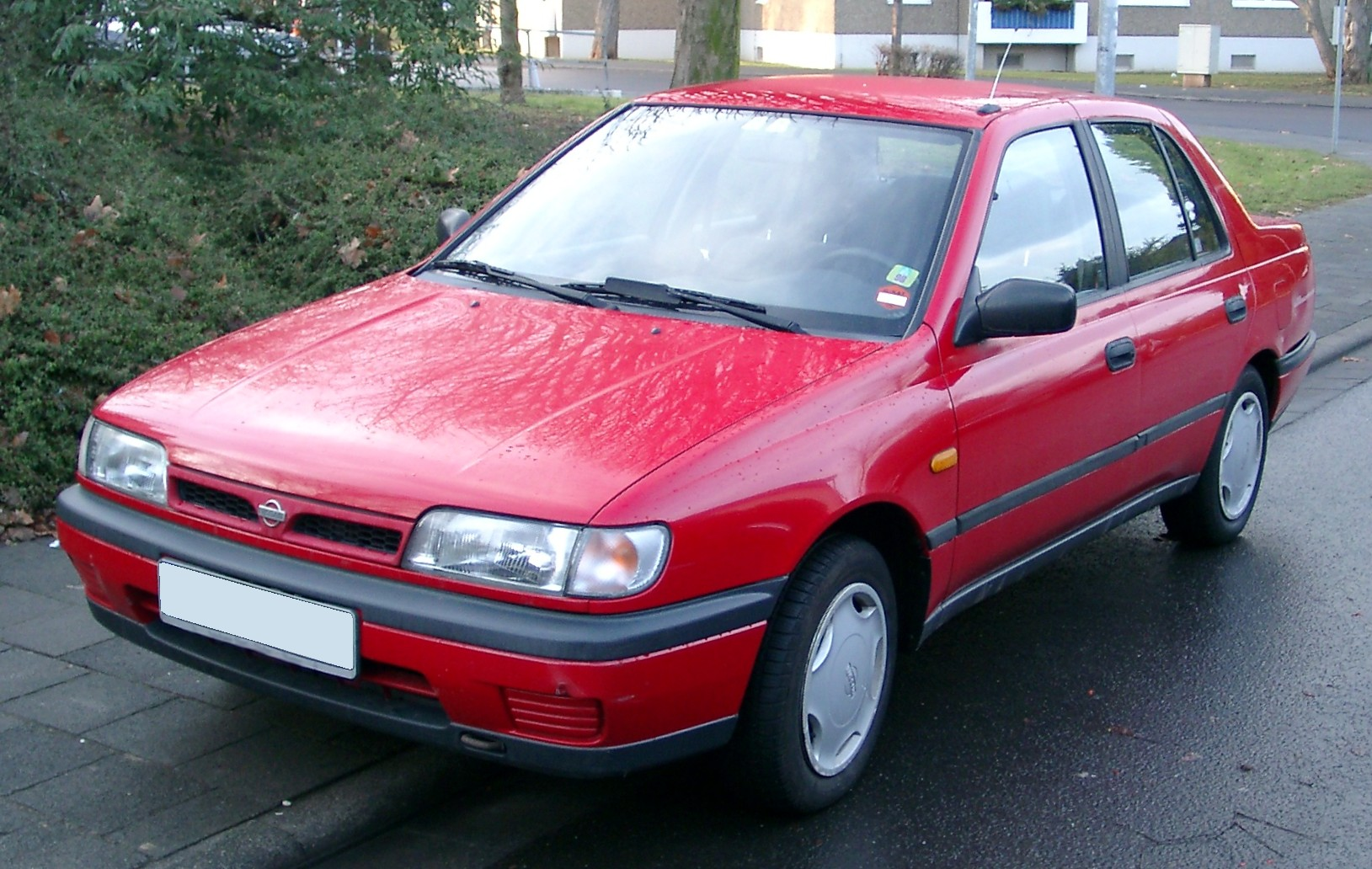
Nissan Sunny (N14; 1991–1995)

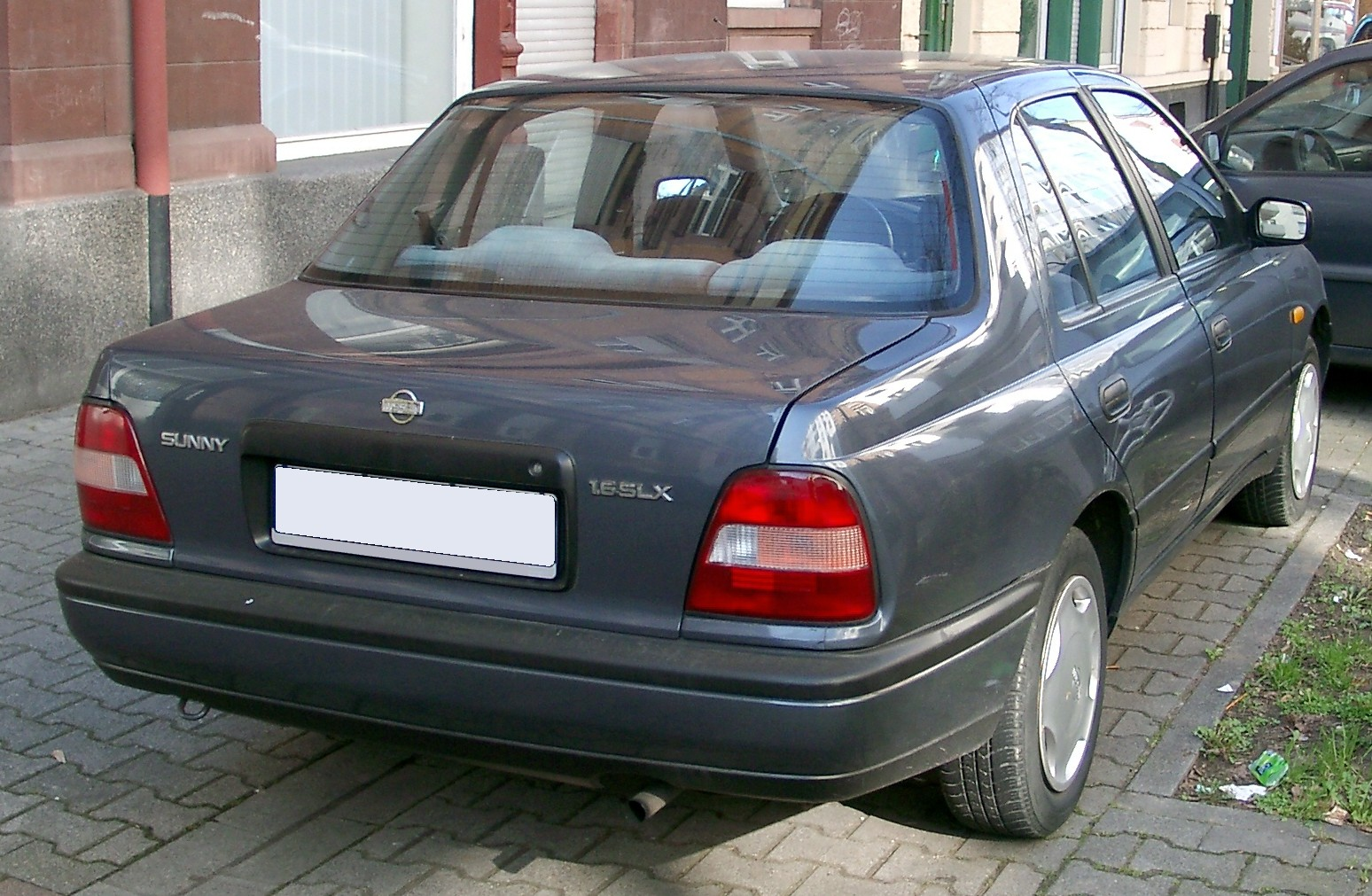
Nissan Sunny (N14; 1991–1995)

=== N16 (2000–2011) ===
Although the Bluebird Sylphy G10 did not spawn a Sunny range in Japan, it was sold as the Sunny Neo in Thailand and as the Sunny in Hong Kong, Kenya, Singapore, Sri Lanka and the People's Republic of China, where it is produced by the Dongfeng Motor Company, a joint venture with Nissan. Also, the N16 series was sold in parts of Latin America and in Europe as the Nissan Almera. The N16 series was also sold in Bangladesh through Pacific Nissan dealers in the EX Saloon trim, from 2001 to 2011, with two minor facelifts.

In Sri Lanka, Nissan sold the Bluebird Sylphy G10 as the Nissan Sunny N16 in two trims: EX saloon and Super Saloon. While there were differences in measurements and exteriors, the interiors were mostly the same. Nissan offered various models with different nameplates like Bluebird, Sylphy, and Cefiro, each having modified specifications. It's important to note that these nameplates didn't exactly match the global models with the same names. The EX saloon had a black grille and was offered with the 1.3 L QG13DE engine.

From the 2007 model year, its platform changed to the Renault Samsung SM3, that is sold in parts of Europe as the Almera Classic. Also since 2007, the Renault Samsung SM3 is sold as the Nissan Sunny in the Middle East, with a solitary trim that comes with a 1.5-litre engine.

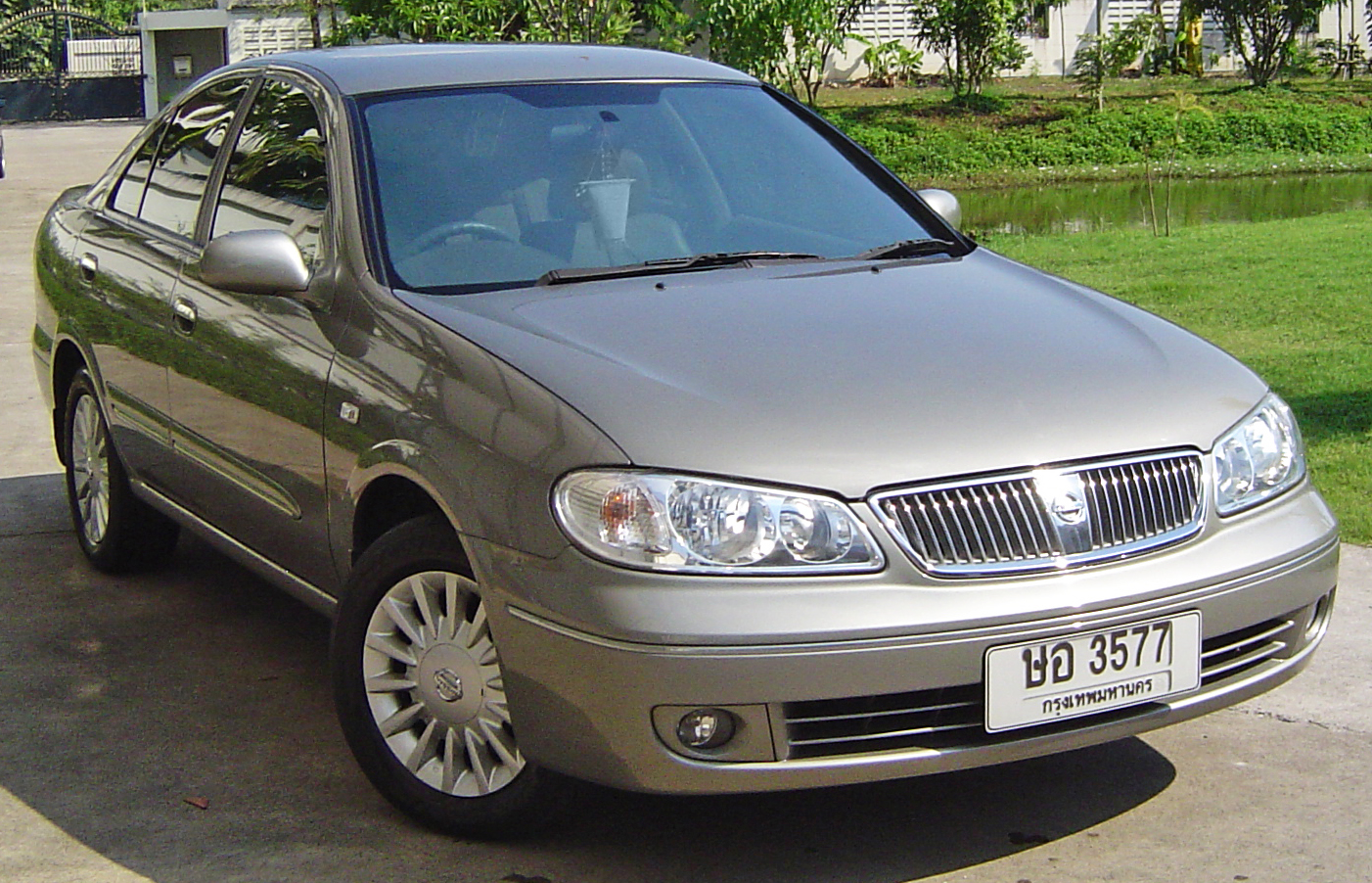
Nissan Sunny (N16; 2000–2005)

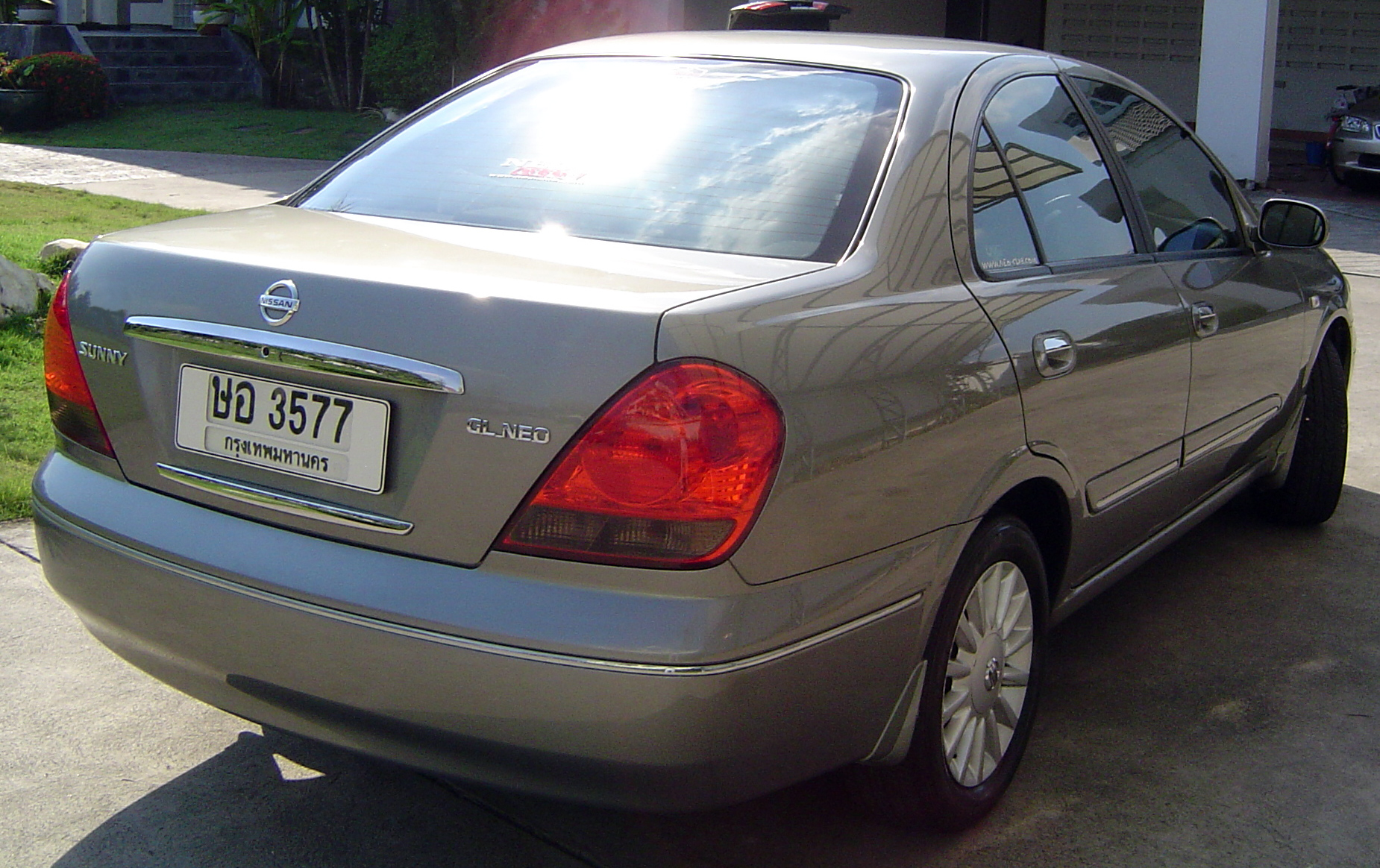
Nissan Sunny (N16; 2000–2005)

=== N17 (2011–2020) ===
The N17 series Sunny was unveiled at the 2010 Guangzhou International Motor Show in China. Sales began in 2011. It was also sold in the Indian and many Middle Eastern markets under the same name. Other names include the Almera in Southeast Asia and the Versa in Americas.

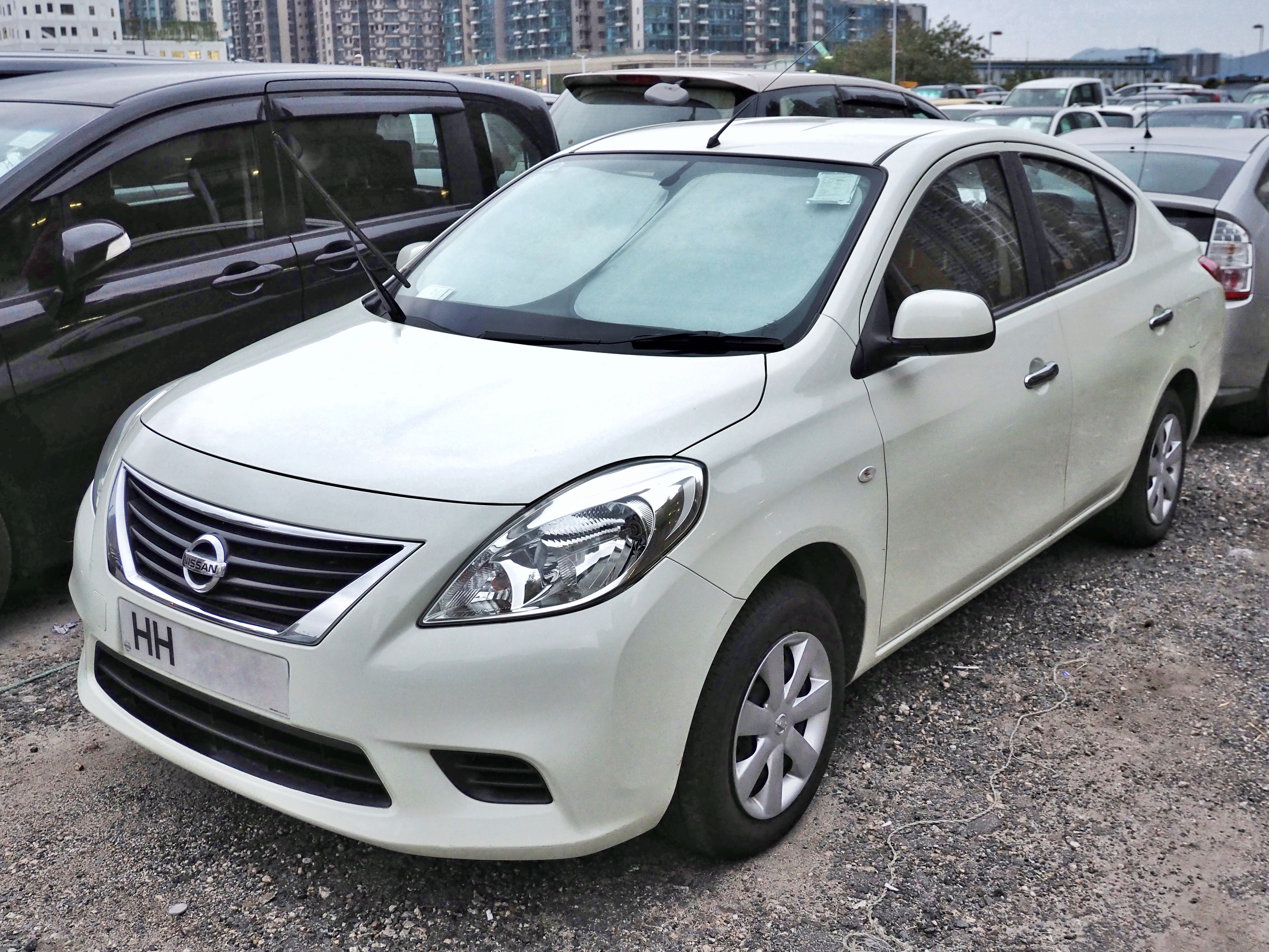
Nissan Sunny (N17; 2011–2020)

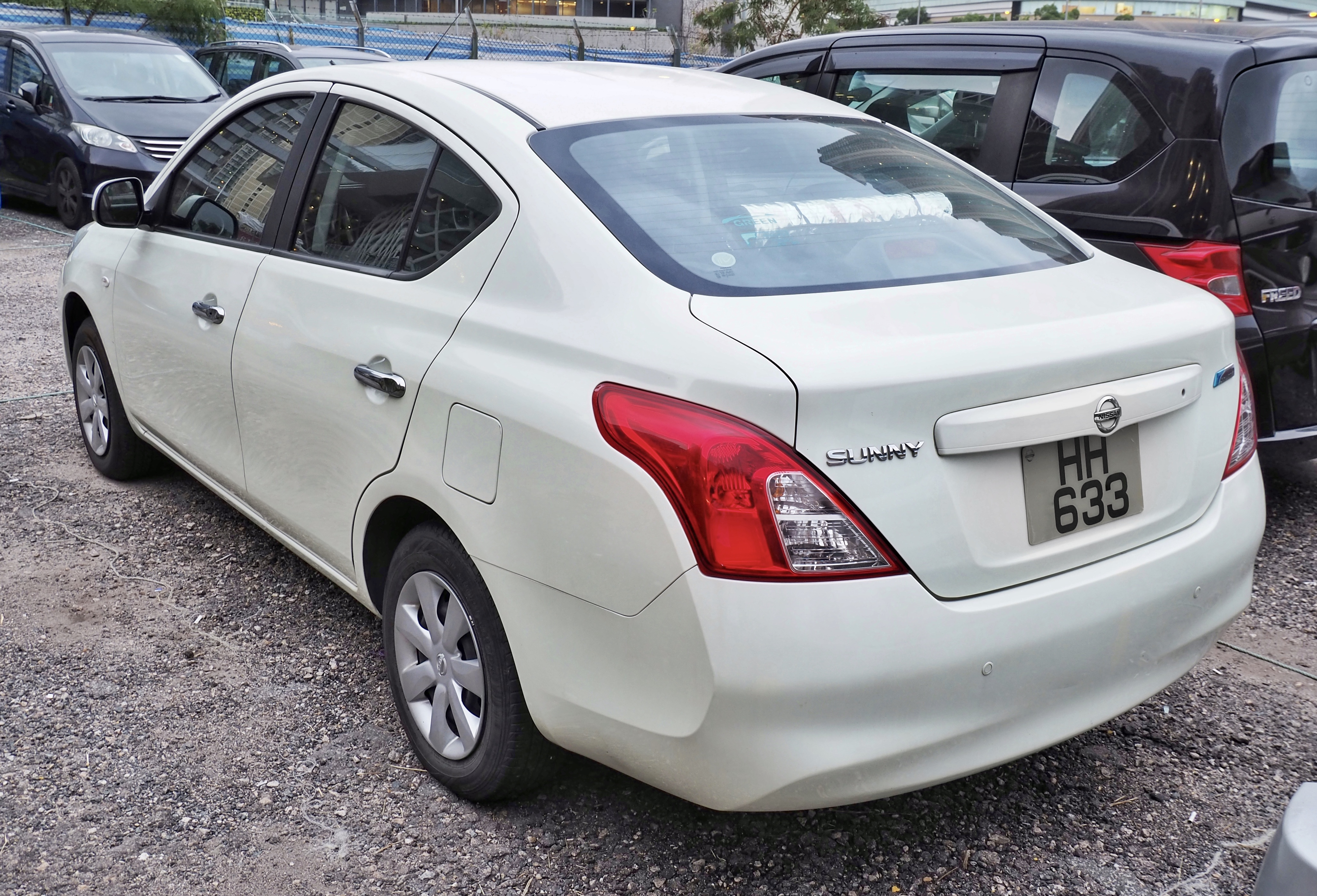
Nissan Sunny (N17; 2011–2020)

=== N18 (2020–present) ===
The N18 series Sunny was unveiled in the United Arab Emirates at the Dubai International Motor Show in November 2019.

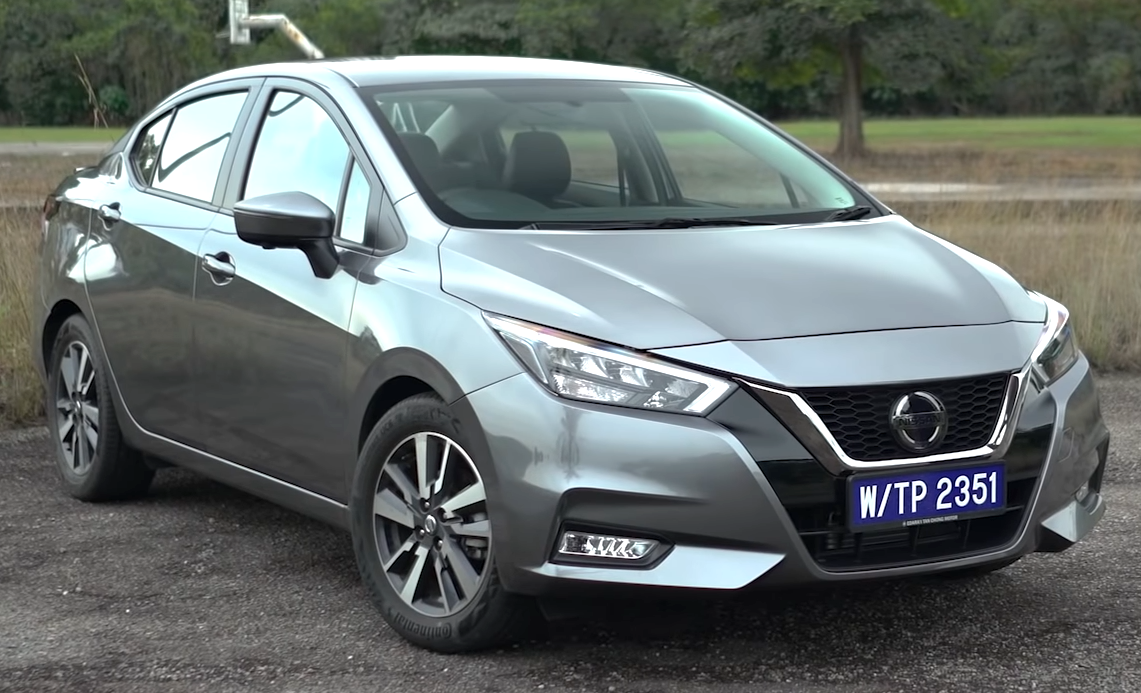
Nissan Sunny (N18; 2019–present)

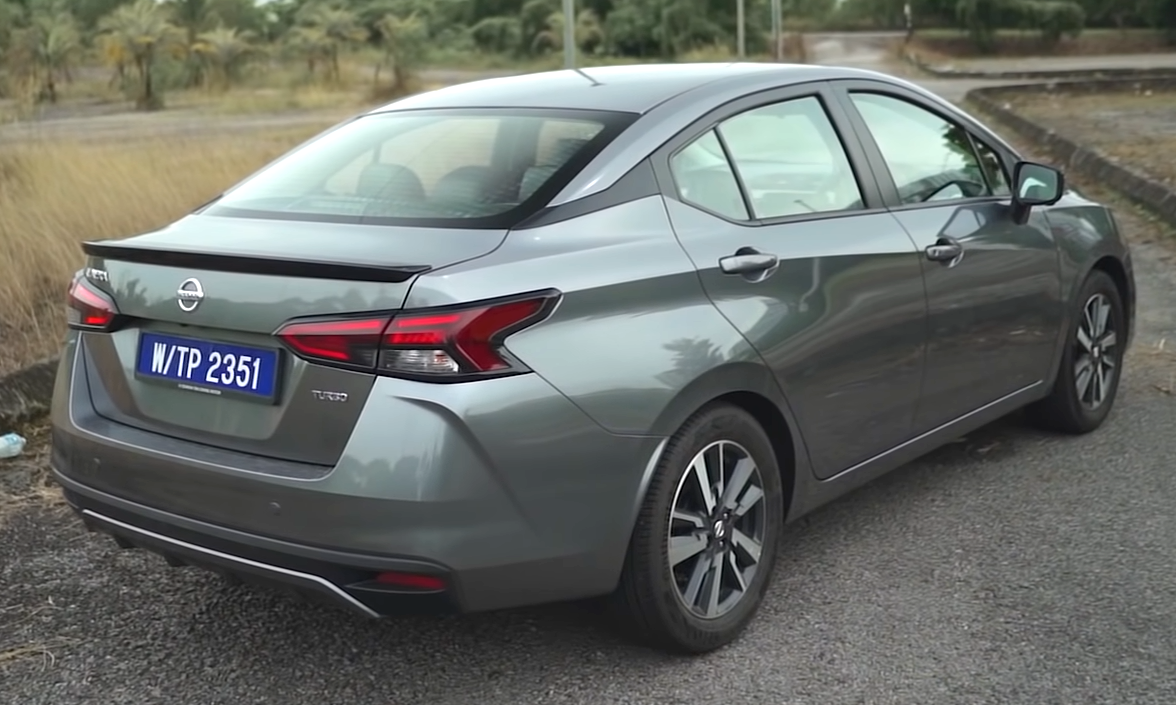
Nissan Sunny (N18; 2019–present)
