= Azure Transit Connect Electric =

Azure Dynamics/Ford Transit Connect Electric
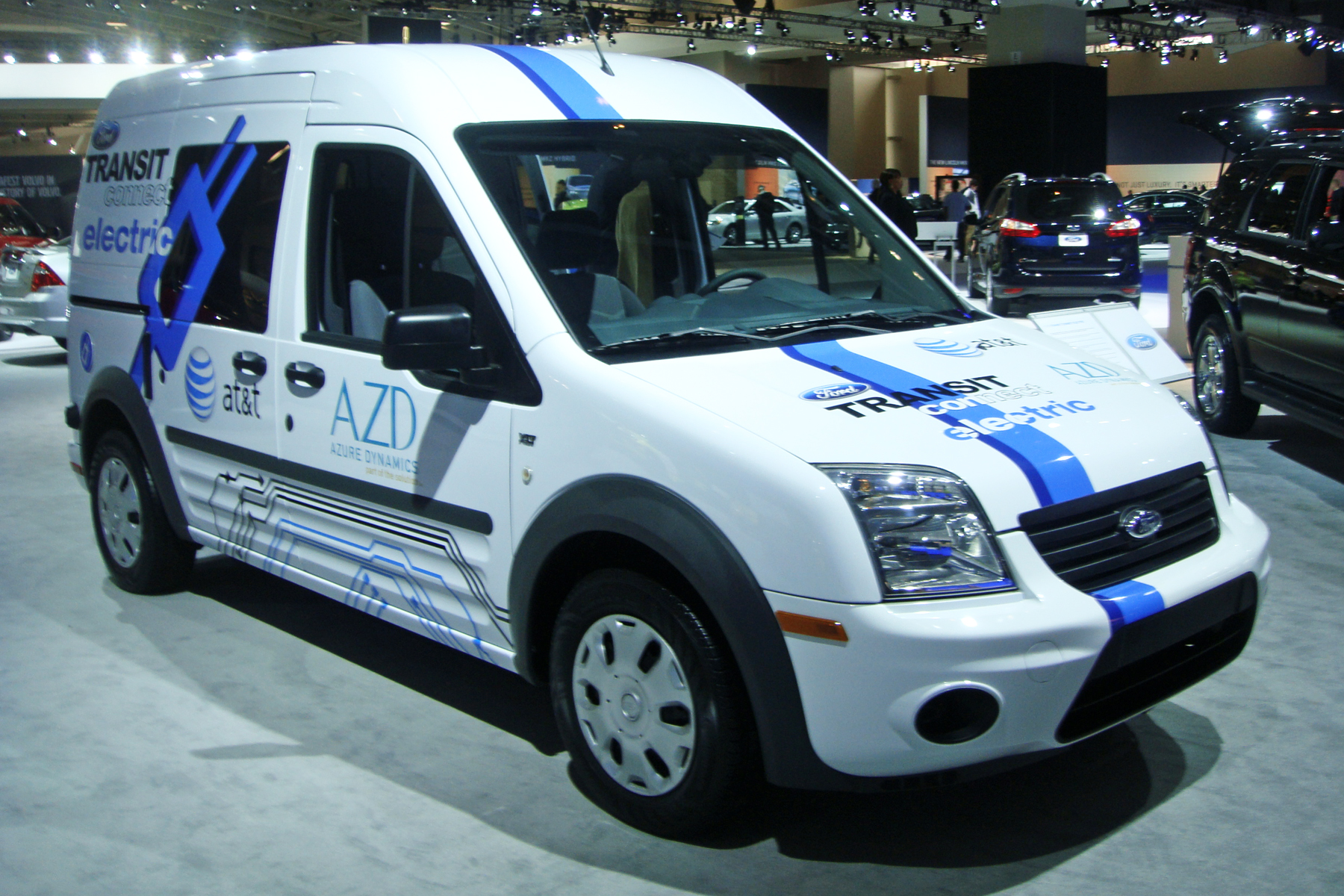

Overview
- Manufacturer: Azure Dynamics (of record) and Ford Motor Company
- Production: December 2010 – March 2012

Body and chassis
- Body style: Van

Powertrain
- Electric motor: Siemens three-phase AC induction motor 52 kW (70 hp), 235 N⋅m (173 ft⋅lb)
- Transmission: Single-speed transaxle, 8.28:1 ratio
- Battery: 28 kWh lithium-ion
- Range: 56 mi (90 km) (EPA)
- Plug-in charging: SAE J1772: 3.3 kW 100–240 V AC onboard charger

Dimensions
- Wheelbase: 2,911 mm (114.6 in)
- Curb weight: 1,791 kg (3,948 lb)

The Azure Dynamics Transit Connect Electric is an all-electric van developed as a collaboration between Azure Dynamics and Ford Motor Company, but Azure was the official manufacturer of record. Due to financial difficulties, production of the electric van was stopped in March 2012, as the company filed for bankruptcy protection in the Supreme Court of British Columbia.

The official US Environmental Protection Agency all-electric range is 56 mi (90 km) and has a combined city/highway fuel economy of 62 miles per gallon gasoline equivalent (3.8 L/100 km equivalent) based on the five-cycle tests using varying driving conditions and climate controls, with the same 62 mpg-e rating for both city and highway. The energy consumption for combined city/highway was rated at 54 kWh/100 mi.

== Production ==
Production began in December 2010, and full capacity was expected to be reached in April 2011 to produce between 600 and 700 units a year. The Transit Connect Electric was produced using a vehicle glider at a Ford Motor Company facility in Kocaeli, Turkey and then shipped to Azure Dynamics U.S. upfitter, AM General in Livonia, Michigan, where the Force Drive™ electric drive train and other components are added to the vehicle. Azure Dynamics partnered with Johnson Controls-Saft to produce the lithium-ion battery pack used in the Transit Connect Electric. The vehicle was badged with both the Ford Blue Oval and Azure's Force Drive logos, with Azure Dynamics being the manufacturer of record. The company expected to produce between 600 and 1000 Transit Connect Electric vehicles during 2011, and planned to double that in 2012.

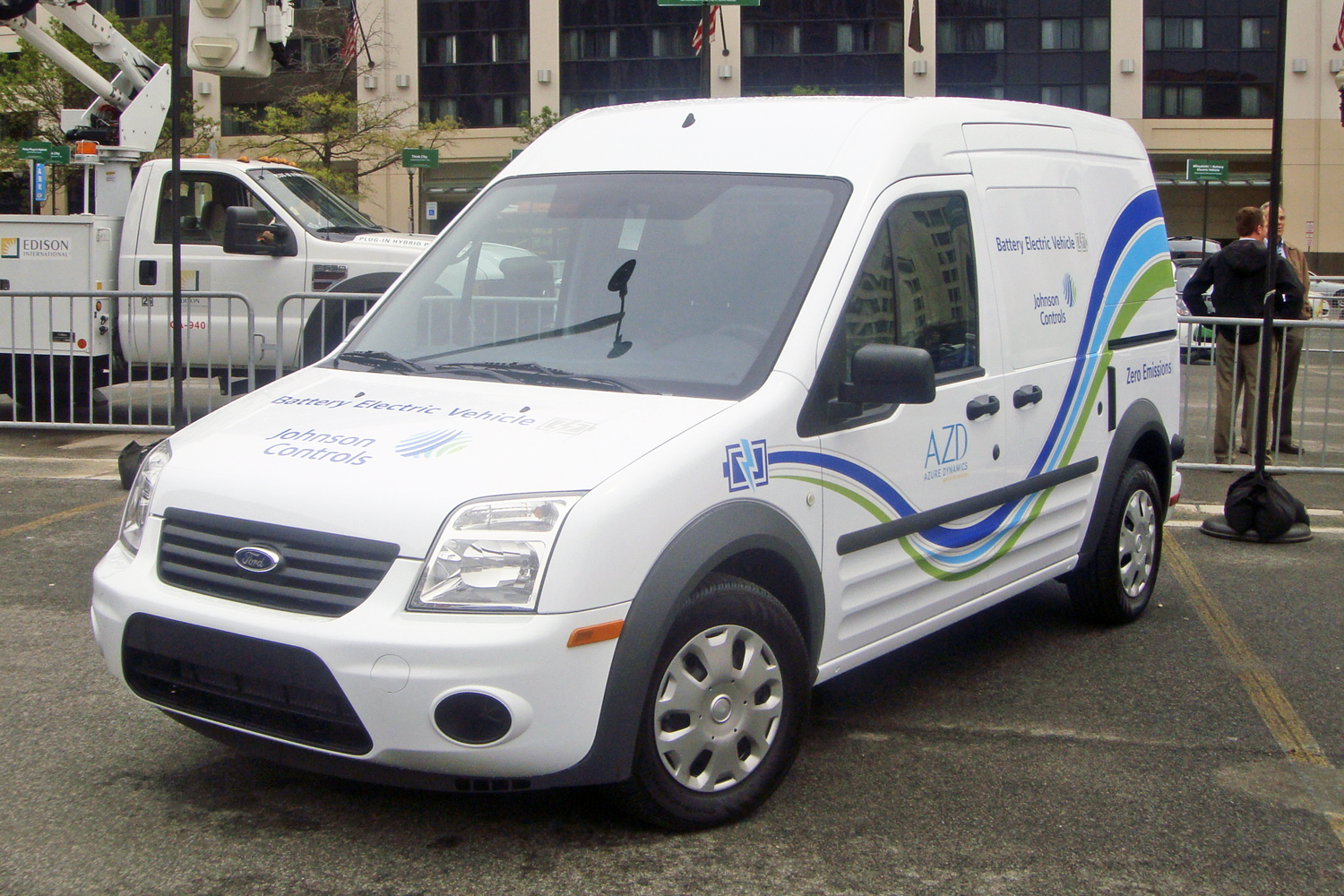
Transit Connect Electric frontal view

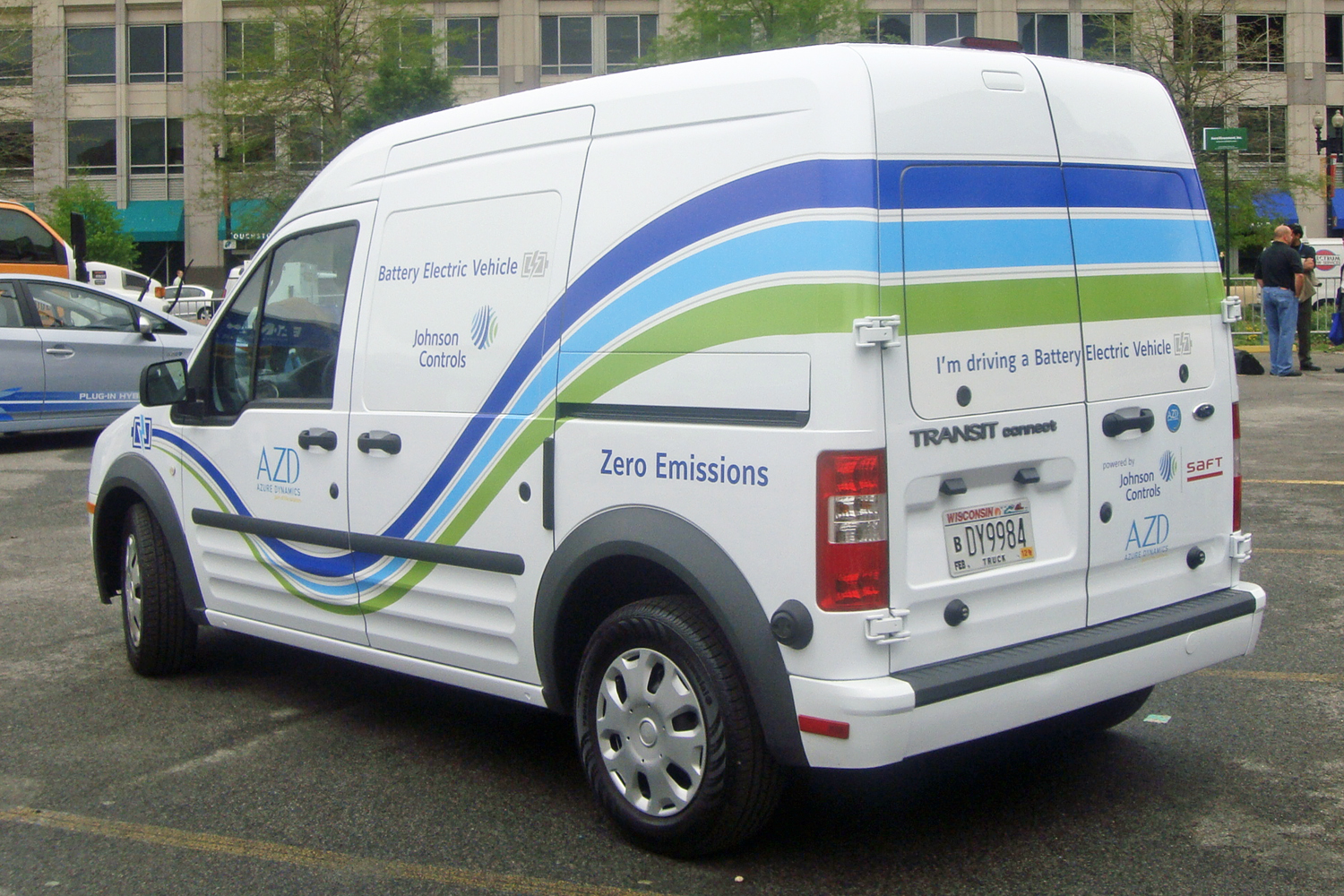
Transit Connect Electric rear view

== Specifications ==
According to Ford and Azure, the Transit Connect Electric has an all-electric range of up to 80 mi (130 km), but the official US Environmental Protection Agency range is 56 mi (90 km). The electric van has a speed up to 75 mph (121 km/h).

The EPA rated the combined city/highway fuel economy at 62 miles per gallon gasoline equivalent (3.8 L/100 km equivalent) based on the five-cycle tests using varying driving conditions and climate controls, with the same 62 mpg-e rating for both city and highway. The energy consumption for combined city/highway was 54.4 kWh/100 mi.

The three-phase AC induction motor is provided by Siemens, operating on a nominal 300 V; it has a rated peak output of 235 N⋅m (173 lbf⋅ft) and continuous output of 52 kW (70 hp) / 158 N⋅m (117 lbf⋅ft). The wheels are driven through a Borg-Warner reduction gearbox with an 8.28:1 ratio. It draws from a battery with a nominal capacity of 28 kW-hr, composed of 16 modules divided into 192 cells in total. The onboard charger has a maximum rate of 3.3 kW.

== Markets and sales ==
The first units were delivered to a select group through Azure's "LEAD Customer Program" in the U.S and Canada in December 2010, among the first customers were AT&T, Canada Post, the New York Power Authority and Southern California Edison. The Transit Connect Electric was priced at US$57,400, which more than doubles the price of the gas-powered version even after federal and any state or local incentives for electric vehicles are discounted.

The Transit Connect Electric was targeted towards the commercial fleet market and other "LEAD" customers included: Johnson Controls, Toronto Atmospheric Fund (FleetWise EV300 Program), Xcel Energy., and DHL. On March 22, 2011, Ford Motor Company and Azure Dynamics Corporation announced its first European customer order of 20 Transit Connect Electric vehicles by the Norwegian Post. A test fleet of 14 was exported to the United Kingdom for the government's Ultra-Low Carbon Vehicle Demonstrator program. As of October 2011 global sales reached 460 units since its introduction in December 2010. Around 500 units were sold before Azure stopped production in March 2012.

== Passenger version ==
In November 2011 Ford and Azure announced the introduction of a passenger wagon version of the Transit Connect Electric. The passenger version would have a liquid-cooled 28 kWh lithium-ion battery from Johnson Controls, that is expected to deliver a range of 55 to 80 mi (89 to 129 km) on a single charge depending on driving conditions and accessory use. The wagon version has a top speed of 75 mph (121 km/h).

== See also ==
- Ford Focus Electric
- Ford Transit Connect
- Government incentives for plug-in electric vehicles
- List of modern production plug-in electric vehicles
- List of production battery electric vehicles
- Plug-in electric vehicle
- Zero-emissions vehicle
