= Ford Transit Connect =

Compact panel van manufactured by Ford

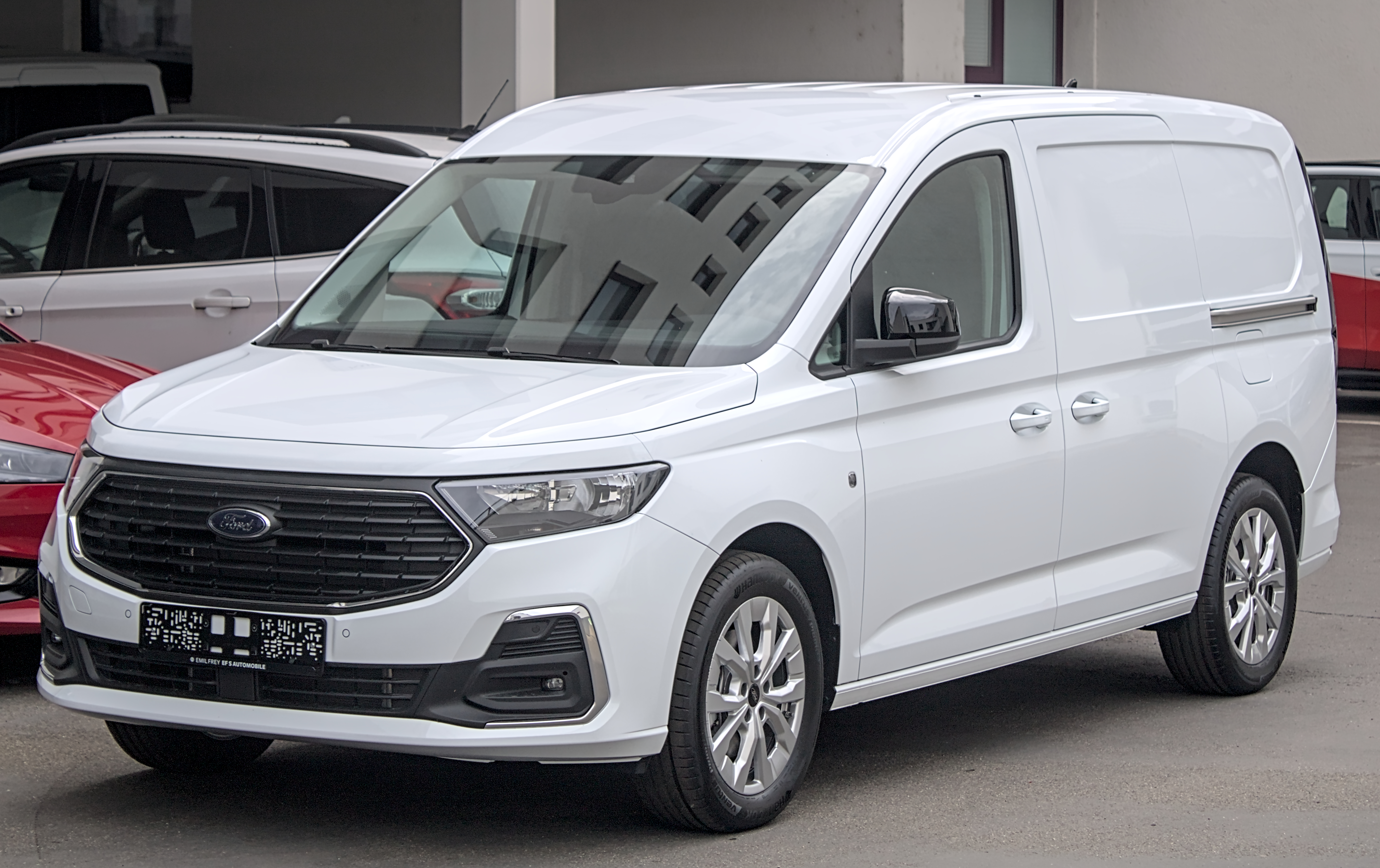

Overview
- Manufacturer: Ford of Europe
- Also called: Ford Tourneo Connect; Azure Transit Connect Electric
- Production: 2002–present
- Model years: 2010–2023 (North America)

Body and chassis
- Class: Compact van; Leisure activity vehicle
- Body style: 4/5-door panel van; 4/5-door LAV
- Layout: Front-engine, front-wheel-drive

Chronology
- Predecessor: Ford Escort Van; Ford Courier

The Ford Transit Connect is a compact panel van manufactured and marketed by Ford since 2002. Developed by Ford of Europe, the model line replaced sedan-based vans (Ford Escort and Ford Courier vans) with a dedicated commercial vehicle platform. The model line is the second-smallest vehicle of the Ford Transit range, positioned between the Ford Transit Courier LAV and the Ford Transit Custom LCV/MPV. In line with other Ford Transit variants, passenger-oriented models (in Europe) are marketed as the Ford Tourneo Connect with side windows and rear seats.

The first and second-generation Transit Connect has been imported to North America from the 2010 model year. To circumvent the 25% "chicken tax" on imported light trucks, all examples have been imported as passenger vans, with cargo vans converted to the intended configuration after their importation. In the region, the Transit Connect does not have a direct predecessor; the closest vehicle to its size was the standard-length Ford Aerostar cargo van, which ceased production in 1997.

The first-generation Transit Connect was assembled by Ford Otosan (Kocaeli, Turkey) along with Ford Romania (Craiova, Romania). For the second generation, Ford of Europe shifted production to its Ford Valencia Body and Assembly facility (Almussafes, Valencia, Spain). For 2022, a third generation of the Tourneo Connect was released; based on the Volkswagen Caddy, the model line is assembled by Volkswagen in Poland.

== First generation (2002) ==
First generation
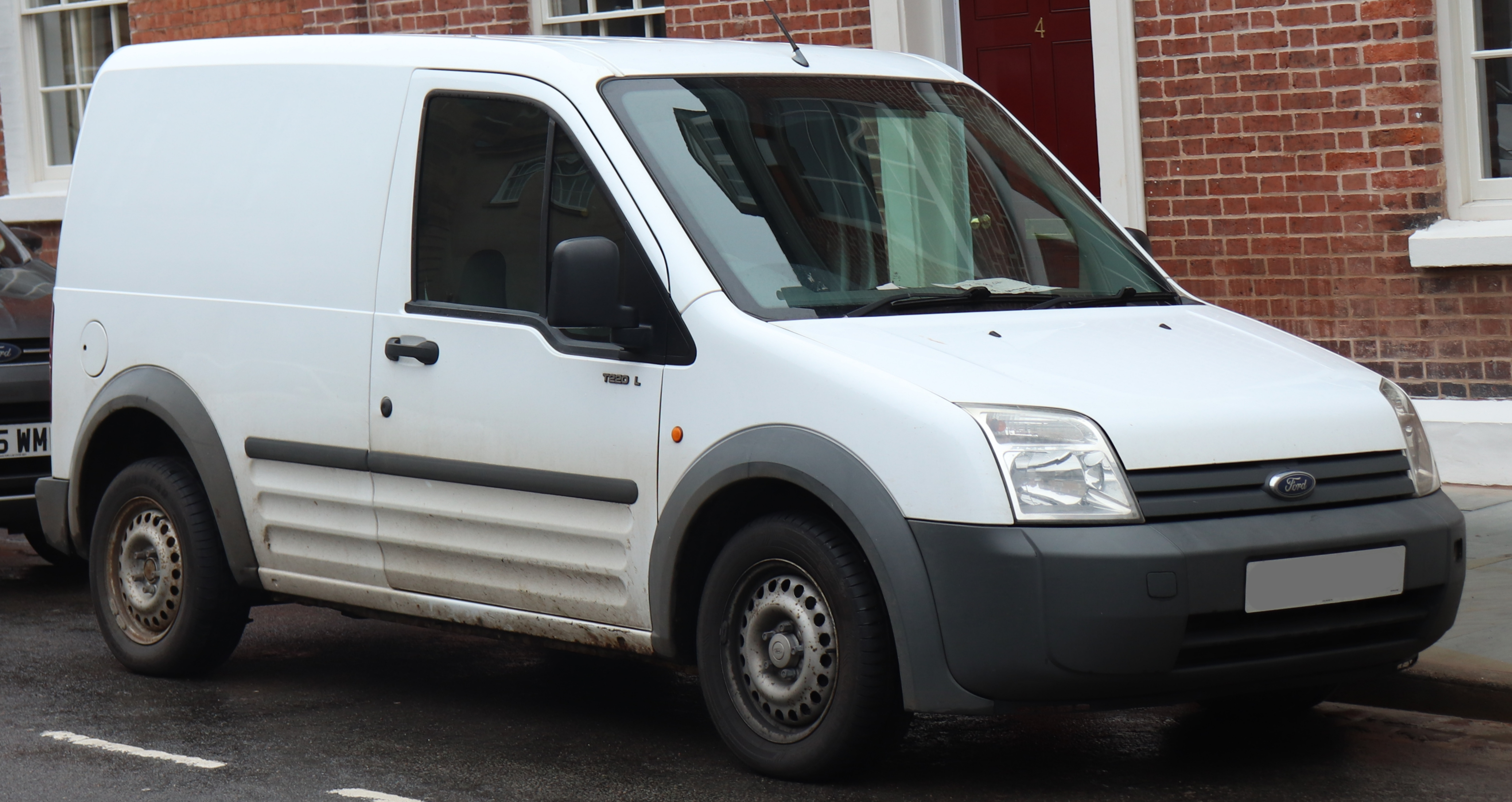

Overview
- Manufacturer: Ford Otosan
- Also called: Ford Tourneo Connect (Europe and Turkey); Azure Transit Connect Electric
- Production: November 2002–2013; September 2009–2013 (Romania)
- Model years: 2002–2013 (Turkey); 2003–2013 (Europe); 2010–2013 (North America)
- Assembly: Turkey: Gölcük, Kocaeli (Ford Otosan); Romania: Craiova (Ford Romania)
- Designer: Peter Horbury

Body and chassis
- Body style: 4-/5-door panel van; 5-door LAV
- Platform: Ford C170 platform
- Related: Ford Focus

Powertrain
- Engine: 1.8L Duratorq TDCi Diesel I4; 1.8 Endura-D TDDi Diesel I4; 2.0L Duratec Gasoline I4
- Transmission: 4-speed 4F27E automatic; 5-speed manual

Dimensions
- Wheelbase: SWB: 2,664 mm (104.9 in); LWB: 2,912 mm (114.6 in)
- Length: 2004–06 SWB: 4,278 mm (168.4 in) LWB: 4,555 mm (179.3 in); 2007–09 SWB: 4,308 mm (169.6 in); 2010–13 LWB: 4,590 mm (180.7 in); 2010–13 SWB: 4,275 mm (168.3 in)
- Width: 1,795 mm (70.7 in)
- Height: Pre–2009 SWB: 1,814 mm (71.4 in); LWB: 1,981 mm (78.0 in); 2010– LWB: 2,014 mm (79.3 in); 2010–13 SWB: 1,815 mm (71.5 in)
- Curb weight: XL with 2.0L: 3,373 lb (1,530 kg); XLT Wagon with 2.0L: 3,503 lb (1,589 kg); XLT Wagon (Premium) with 2.0L: 3,524 lb (1,598 kg)

The Transit Connect was introduced in Europe in October 2002, replacing the 3-door Escort van and the smaller Fiesta Courier. Adopting the compact panel van form factor of the Opel Combo C and the Renault Kangoo, the Transit Connect was a purpose-built commercial vehicle design rather than an adaptation of a station wagon.

Sharing little more than its nameplate with the much larger Transit, the Transit Connect was a commercial-grade variant of the first-generation C170 Ford Focus, then shared between both European and North American markets. The model line was offered in two wheelbases; the long-wheelbase configuration was fitted with a raised roof. A second sliding door was available as an option. As with the full-size Transit, Ford offered the Tourneo Connect as a leisure activity vehicle with two sliding doors.

In its first year on the North American market, the Transit Connect was awarded "North American Truck of the Year 2010" at the North American International Auto Show (NAIAS).

=== 2006 update ===
In 2006, the Transit Connect was facelifted with a new horizontal fish-gill style front grille design with the Ford emblem on it rather than on the bonnet.

=== 2009 update ===
Since mid-2009, the Transit Connect has been imported to the United States and Canada. First shown in the United States at the 2008 Chicago Auto Show, the 2010 production model was introduced at the following year's show on 11 February 2009.

The introduction of the North American variant coincided with a mid-cycle facelift which includes a restyled front grille, a deeper front bumper and a new dashboard featuring the switchgear and instrument pod from the C307 Focus.

Initially, only the long-wheelbase version of the van, outfitted with a 2.0L four-cylinder petrol engine and 4 speed 4F27E, was offered in North America; elsewhere, the 1.8L diesel engine and 5 speed manual transmission was the only available powertrain. The 2.0L Duratec DOHC I-4 gasoline engine has 136 hp @6300rpm, and 128 lb.-ft. of torque @4750 rpm. It specifies minimum 87 octane gasoline and fuel economy is 21 mpg city/27 mpg hwy and 23 mpg combined.

An electric version followed in 2011, converted by Azure Dynamics Corporation at a U.S. facility.

To build interest and awareness in North America, Transit Connects specifically equipped as "mobile showrooms" were displayed at industrial parks and other venues in 13 U.S. urban areas in May 2009, with the goal of offering 3,000 test drives to small business owners.

With model year 2011, Ford offered the Transit Connect XLT Premium Wagon in the US and Canada, a passenger version of the van — with seating for five, rear windows that opened for ventilation, blind spot awareness, rear view camera, larger alloy wheels, body-colour grille, and front fog lamps.

The Transit Connect Wagon was the first Ford minivan since the 2007 discontinuation of the Freestar, though it was closer in size to the standard length Ford Aerostar sold from 1986 to 1997.

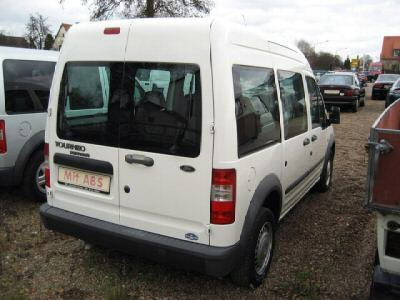
Rear (pre-facelift)

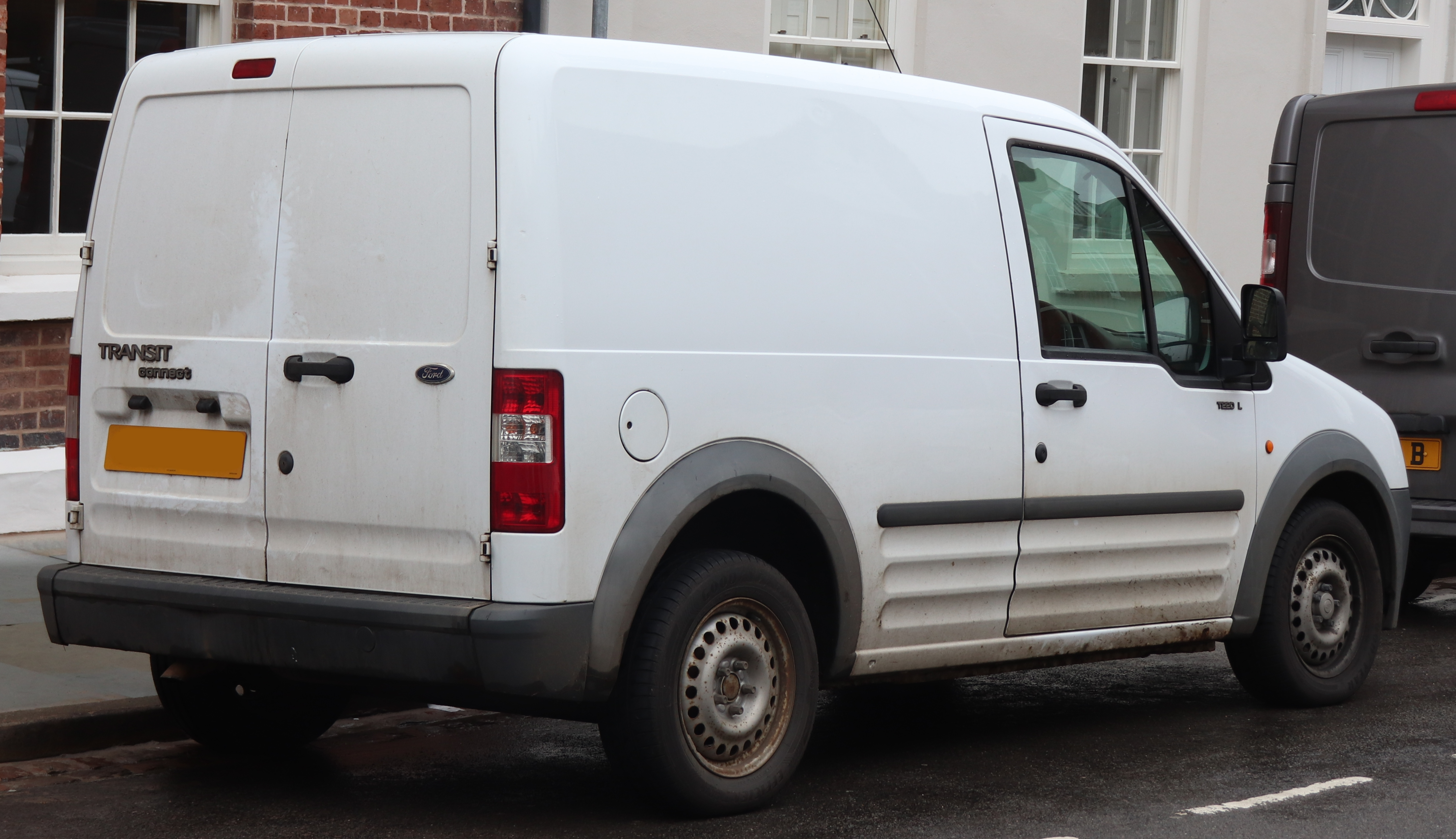
Ford Transit Connect rear (first facelift)

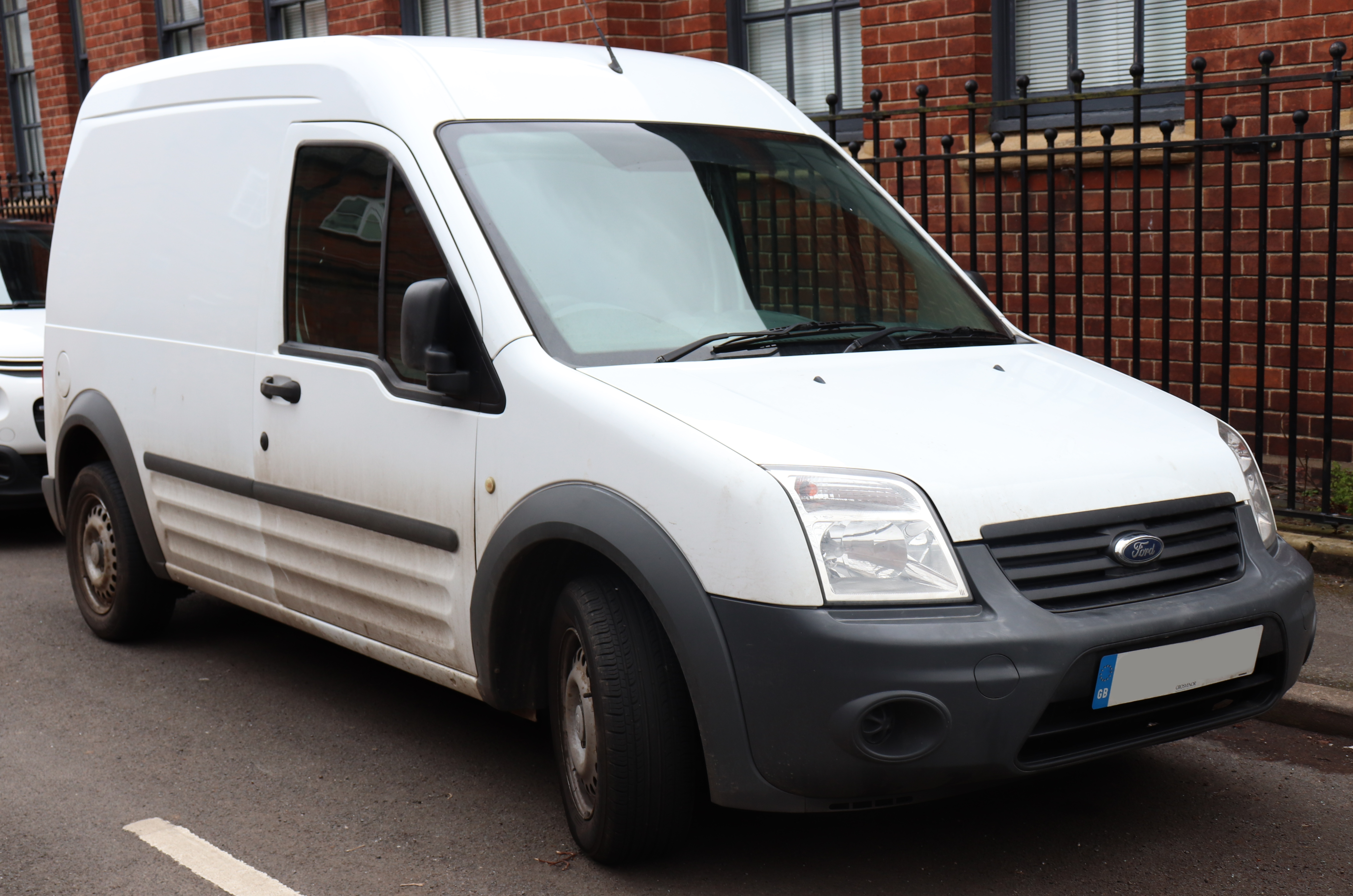
Ford Transit Connect (second facelift)

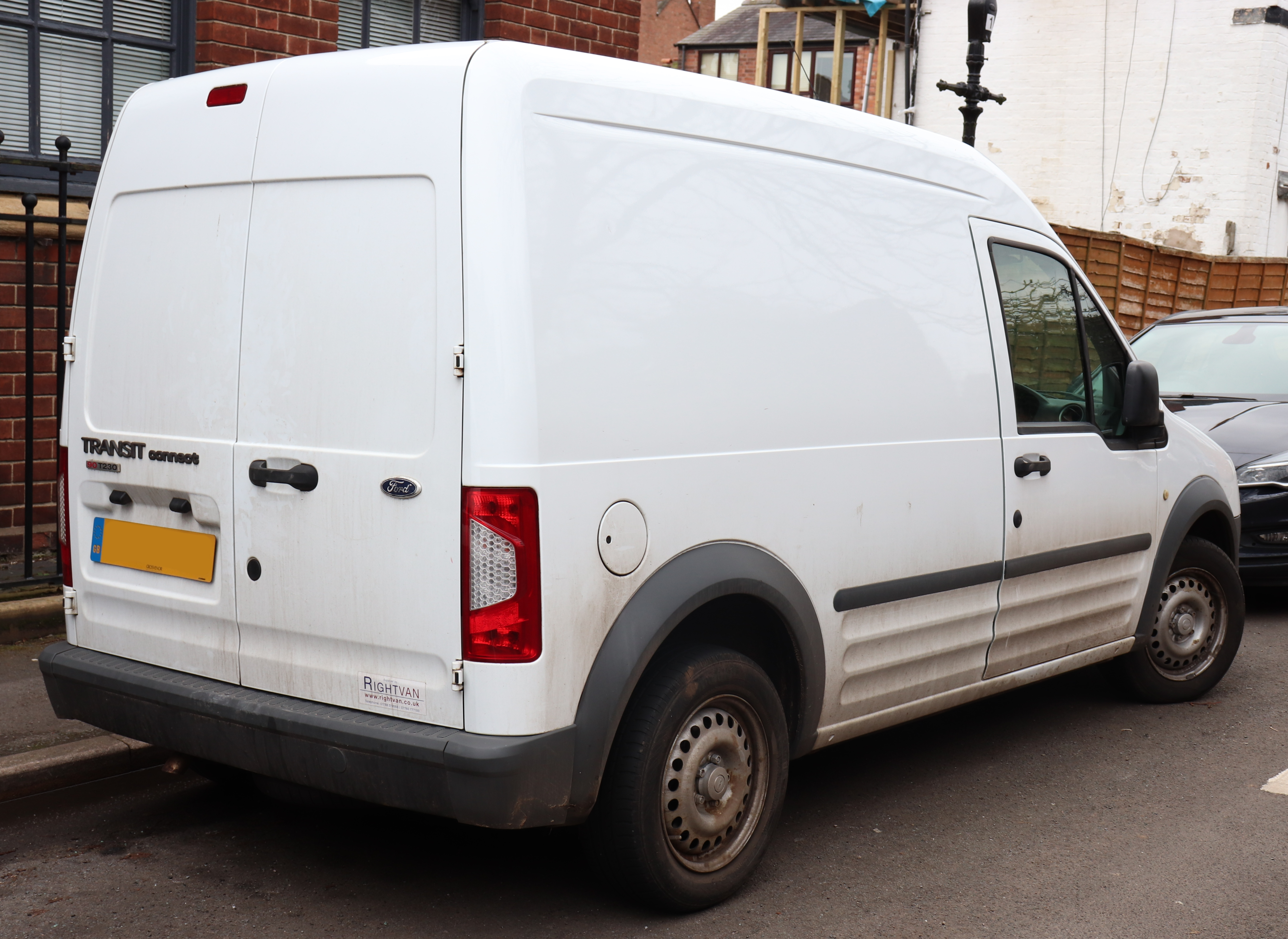
Second facelift model rear

=== Trim levels ===
In the U.S., the Transit Connect was available in two different trim levels, which are XL and XLT. For passenger models, an XLT Premium model was offered.

=== Dimensions ===
Key Transit Connect (1st generation) cargo area dimensions
Length Height				SWB		LWB
Length Height				Exterior	4,275 mm (168.3 in)	4,525 mm (178.1 in)
Length Height				WB	2,664 mm (104.9 in)	2,912 mm (114.6 in)
Length Height				Interior	1,739 mm (68.5 in)	1,986 mm (78.2 in)
Low Roof	Exterior	Interior	Volume	2.8 m^{3} (99 ft^{3})		N/A
Low Roof	1,815 mm (71.5 in)	1,193 mm (47.0 in)	Volume	2.8 m^{3} (99 ft^{3})		N/A
High Roof	1,980 mm (78.0 in)	1,364 mm (53.7 in)	Volume	N/A		3.7 m^{3} (130 ft^{3})

Notes

- Interior width is 1,490 mm (58.7 in) for all versions, 1,226 mm (48.3 in) between the internal wheel arches.

== Second generation (2012) ==
Second generation
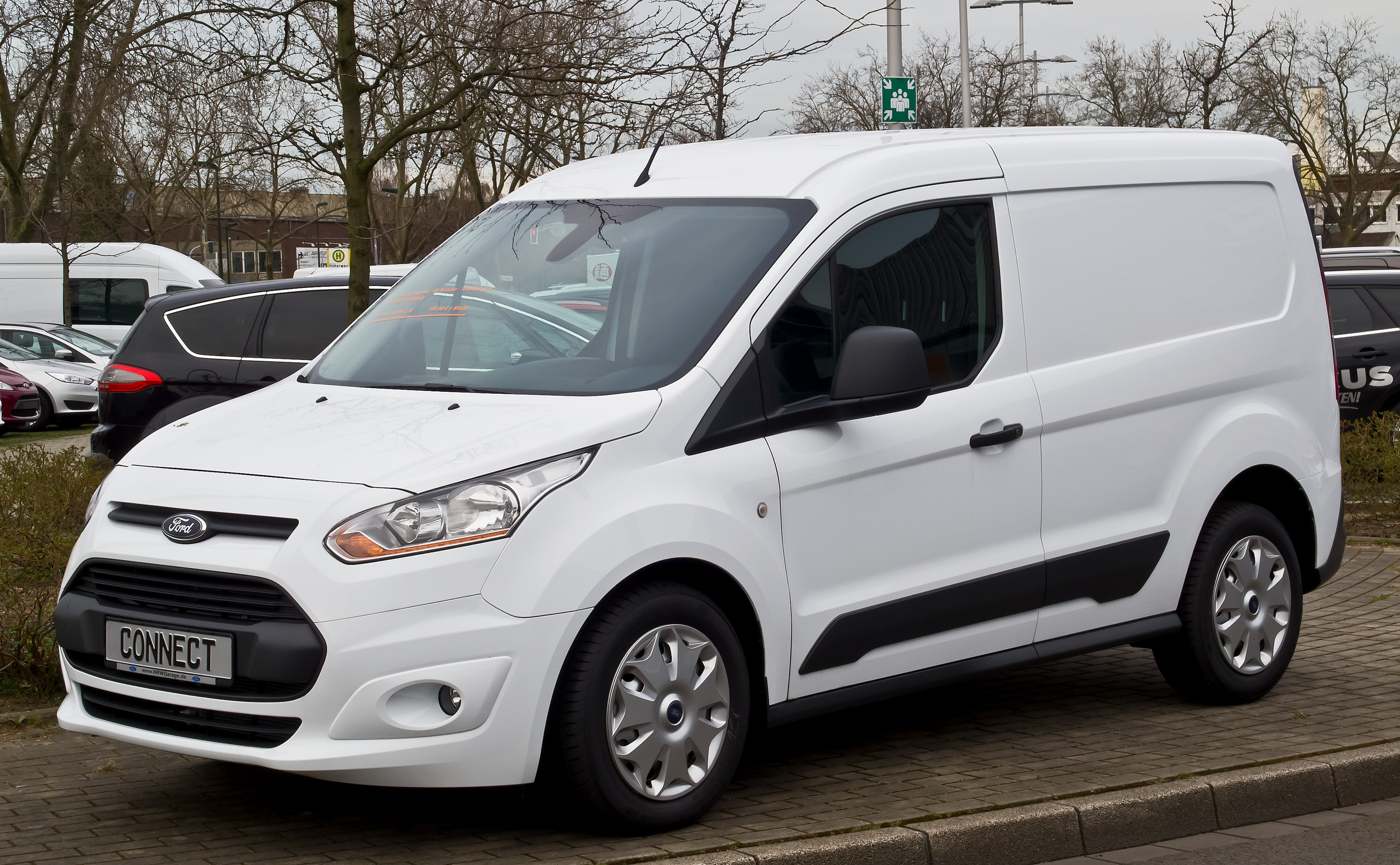

Overview
- Manufacturer: Ford Valencia Body and Assembly
- Also called: Ford Tourneo Connect (Europe and Turkey); Ford Grand Tourneo Connect (LWB) (Europe)
- Production: October 2012–2022; October 2012–2020 (SWB)
- Model years: 2014–2023 (North America)
- Assembly: Spain: Almussafes, Valencia (Ford Valencia Body and Assembly)
- Designer: Paul Wraith

Body and chassis
- Body style: 4-/5-door panel van; 5-door LAV
- Platform: Ford Global C-car Platform

Powertrain
- Engine: Petrol: 1.0 L EcoBoost I3; 1.6 L EcoBoost I4; 2.0 L Duratec 20 I4; 2.5 L Duratec 25 I4; Diesel: 1.5 L Duratorq I4 turbo; 1.5 L EcoBlue I4 turbo
- Transmission: 6-speed automatic 6F-35; 6-speed manual B6; 5-speed manual iB5; 8-speed automatic 8F35 (2019-2022)

Dimensions
- Wheelbase: SWB: 104.8 in (2,660 mm); LWB: 120.6 in (3,060 mm)
- Length: SWB: 173.9 in (4,420 mm); LWB: 189.7 in (4,820 mm)
- Width: 72.2 in (1,830 mm)
- Height: SWB: 72.6 in (1,840 mm); LWB: 72.0 in (1,830 mm)
- Curb weight: SWB Wagon: 3,630 lb (1,650 kg); LWB Wagon: 3,979 lb (1,805 kg)

The second generation Transit Connect was introduced on 6 September 2012 in Amsterdam, Netherlands. In its first redesign since its 2002 introduction, the 2014 Transit Connect adopts many features of the Kinetic Design language. A major design change is an optional rear liftgate in addition to the double doors preferred by commercial buyers and wheelchair users. The Transit Connect will include the optional new feature called MyKey, a personalized key system. MyKey owner controls let the vehicle owner program different keys to restrict different vehicle features, such as top speed and maximum radio volume.

Production takes place at Valencia, Spain. As before, to avoid the 25% tariff on imported trucks, all cargo vans sold in the United States are built and shipped as passenger vans, which are then converted to cargo configuration before delivery.

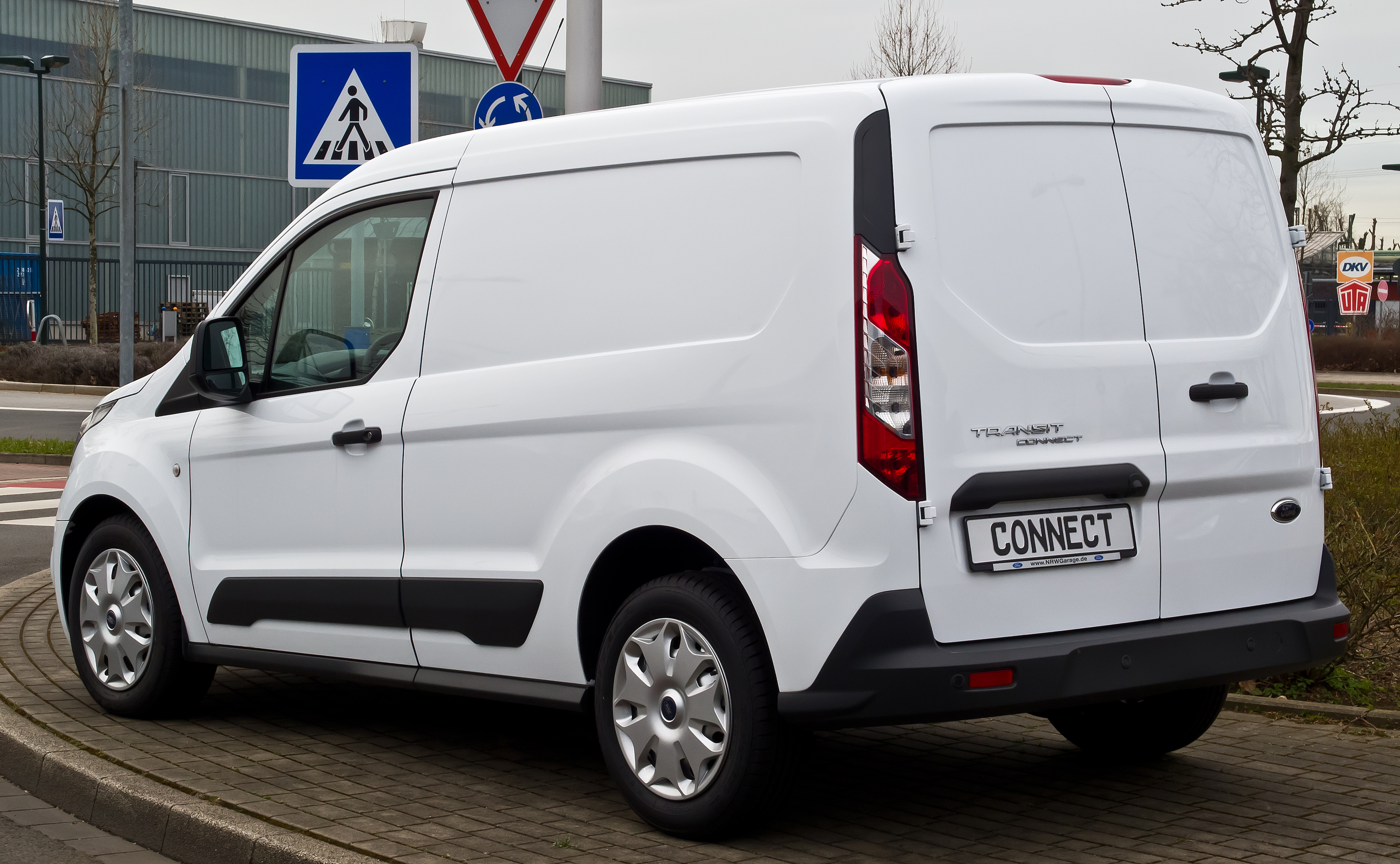
Rear view

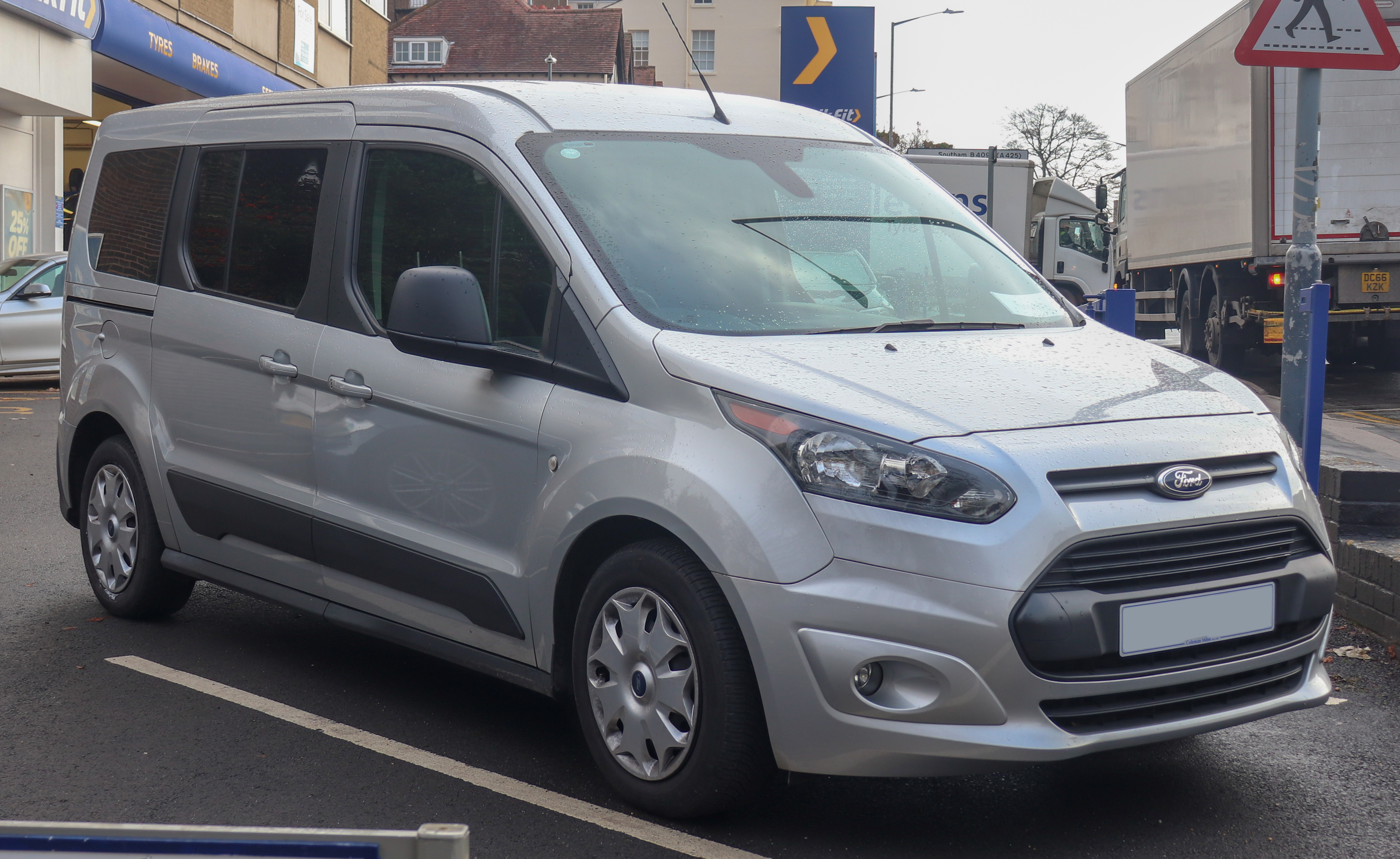
Ford Grand Tourneo Connect

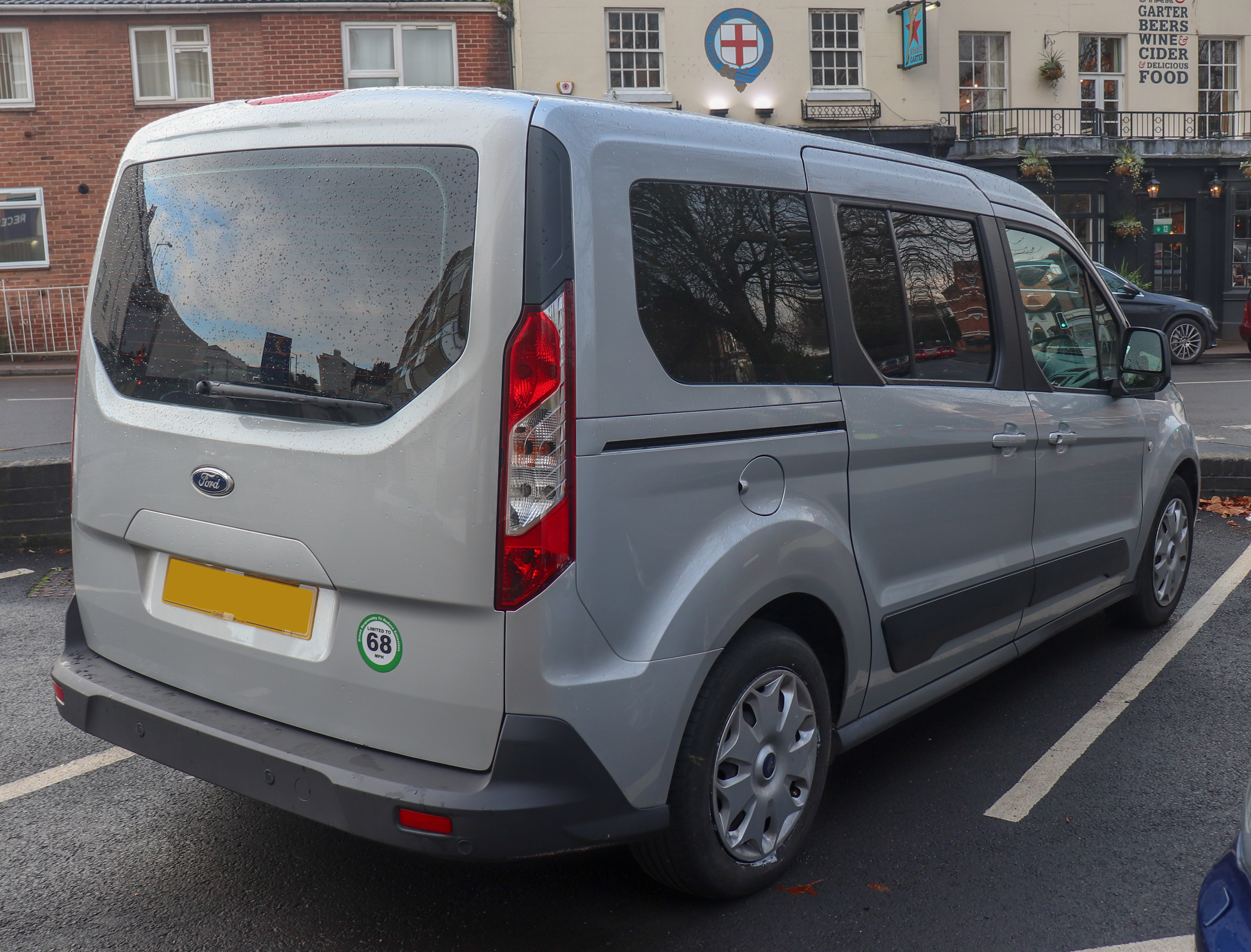
Ford Grand Tourneo Connect with a rear tailgate

=== North America ===
The 2014 Transit Connect is powered by a 2.5-litre inline-4, or a 1.6-litre EcoBoost turbocharged inline-4. The only transmission type available is the 6-speed 6F-35 automatic. For buyers interested in alternative-fuel vehicles, Ford offers optional hardware allowing for the 2.5-litre engine to be converted to use CNG or LPG/propane instead of gasoline.

When sold in the United States, the Tourneo Connect bears the "Transit Connect Wagon" moniker, available in two wheelbases, and with a choice of 5 or 7-passenger seating. The latter configuration is the first 7-passenger minivan sold by Ford since the 2007 discontinuation of the Ford Freestar and Mercury Monterey.

In 2014, it was available in three models, which are XL, XLT, and Titanium.

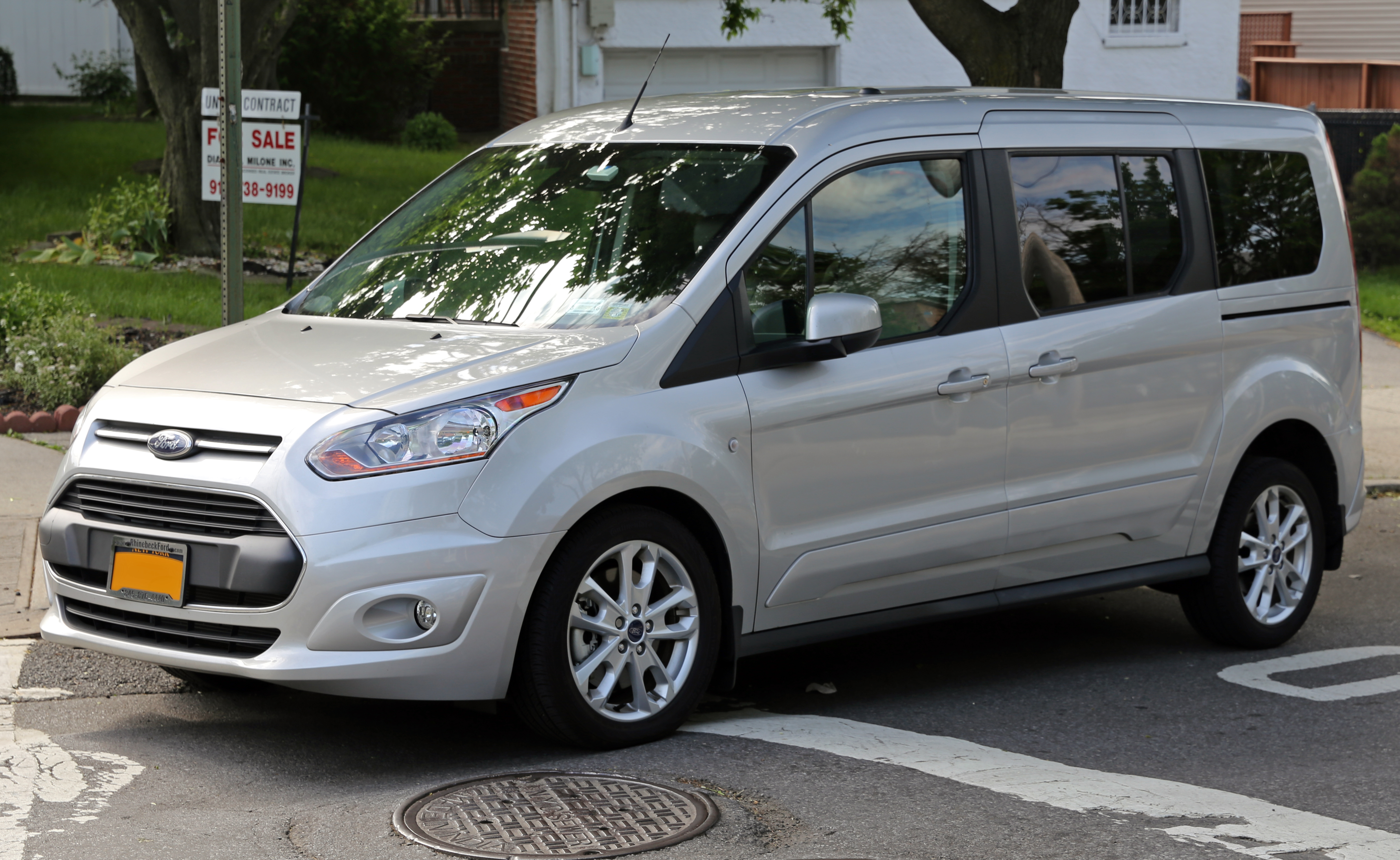
Ford Transit Connect Wagon (US)

=== 2019 facelift ===
For the 2019 model year, the Transit Connect underwent a mid-life update, receiving updates to the front fascia, with the interior receiving a redesigned dashboard. Retaining the multiple wheelbases and body heights from its 2014 launch, the facelifted model replaces the 2.5L engine with a 2.0L direct-injection I4 (the 2.5-litre engine remains an option for LPG/CNG conversion). At the launch of the model facelift, a 1.5L EcoBlue diesel engine was announced; both engines were paired with an 8-speed automatic transmission. In July 2019, after several delays, production of the diesel Transit Connect was abandoned for North America.

For 2020 production, Ford ended production of the short-wheelbase Transit Connect passenger van, solely offering the three-row body style.

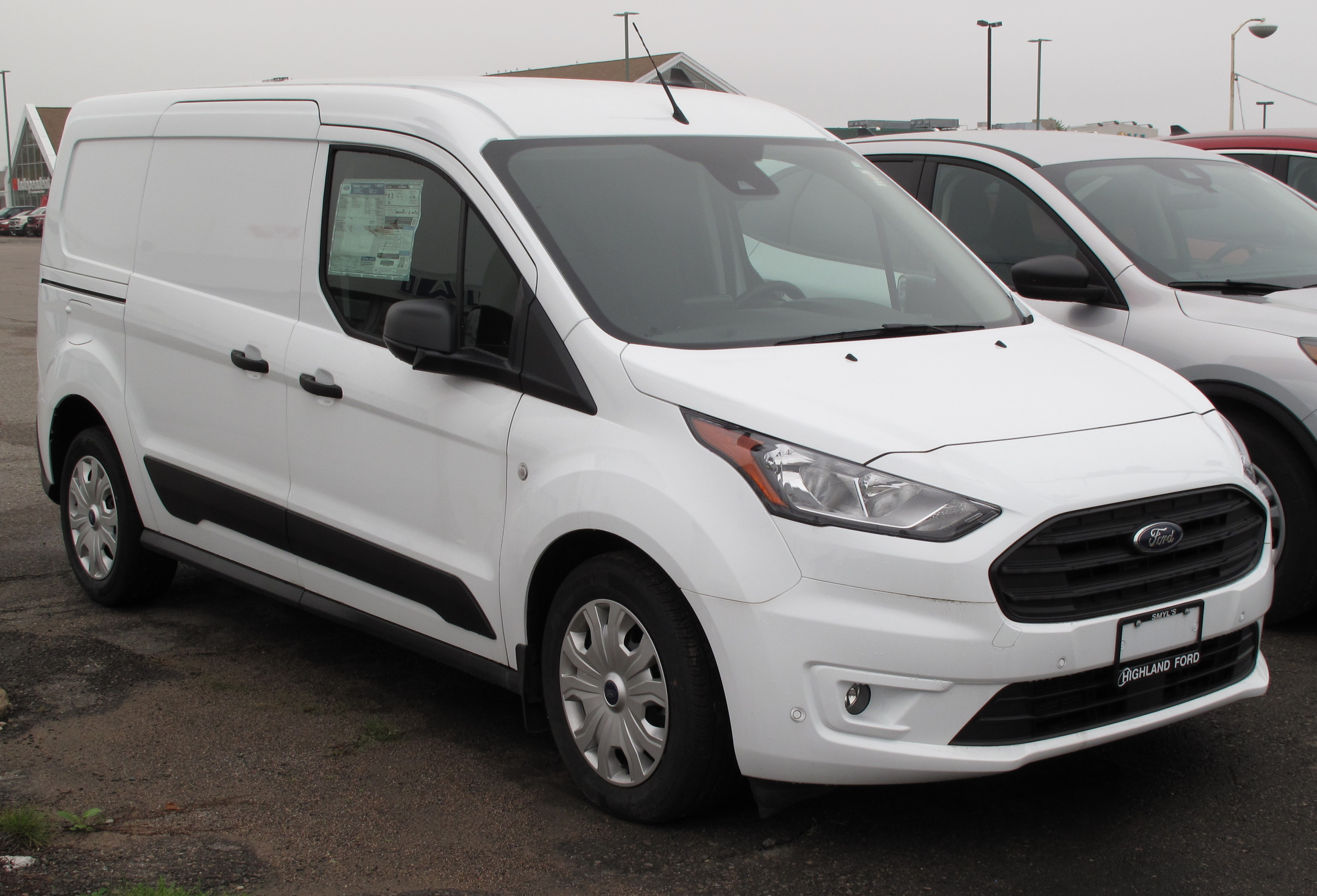
2021 Ford Transit Connect

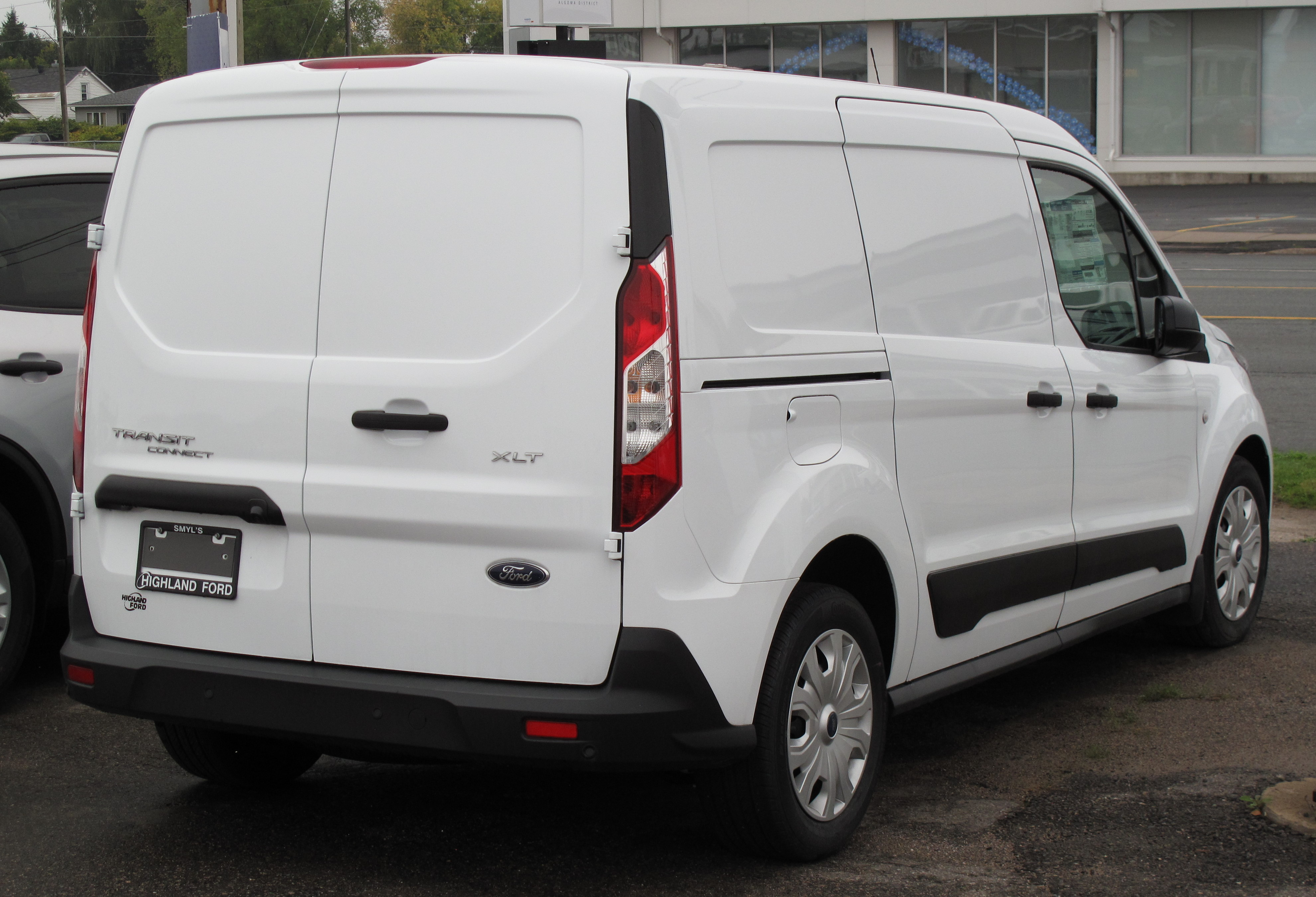
Rear view

=== Cargo capacities ===
- Short wheelbase: 122.6 ft^{3} (3.47 m^{3}) total
- Long wheelbase: 168.5 ft^{3} (4.77 m^{3}) total
- Towing: The 2014 Transit Connect is rated to tow 2,000 lb (910 kg).

==== Max speed and fuel usage ====
The 2014–2021 Ford Transit Connect with the 2.5L engine has an est. MPG (City): 20 mpg_{‑US} (12 L/100 km), MPG (Highway): 27 mpg_{‑US} (8.7 L/100 km), 0–60 time: 9.5 sec. and top speed of 108 miles per hour (174 km/h). The 2022 models with the 2.5L engine saw a reduction to 26 mpg_{‑US} (9.0 L/100 km) highway. While the 2019-2022 models with the 2.0L GDI engine were rated at 24 mpg_{‑US} (9.8 L/100 km) city and 28 mpg_{‑US} (8.4 L/100 km) or 29 mpg_{‑US} (8.1 L/100 km) highway, depending on trim level.

=== Safety and recall ===
In 2017, Ford recalled 2013–2015 Transit Connect with 1.6 EcoBoost engines because of a risk of engine fires caused by a “lack of coolant circulation”. The recall partly contributed to a charge of US$300 million by Ford.

== Third generation (2021) ==
Third generation
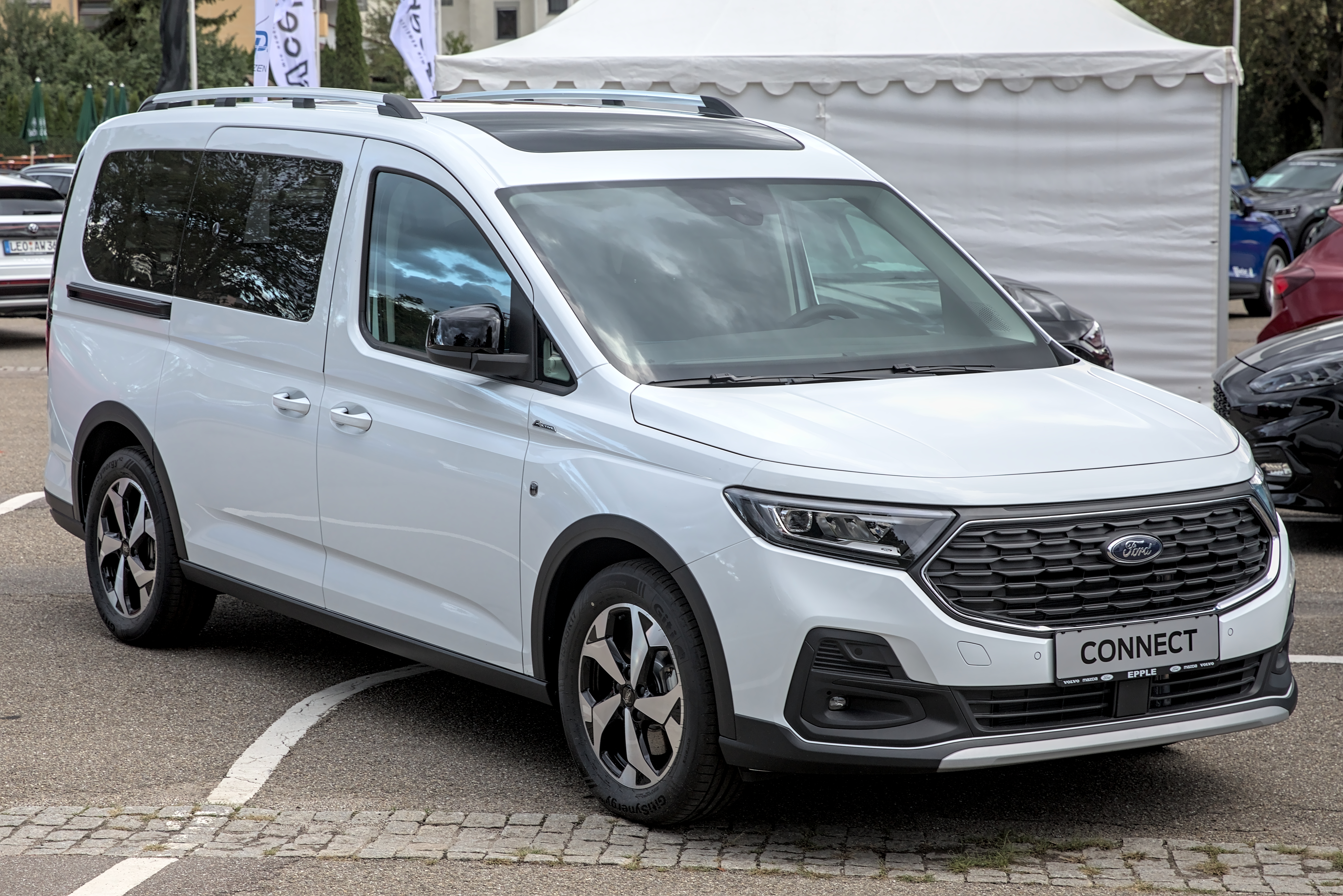
- 2022 Ford Tourneo Connect

Overview
- Manufacturer: Volkswagen Poznań Sp. z o.o.
- Also called: Volkswagen Caddy
- Production: 2021–present (Tourneo Connect) 2024–present (Transit Connect)
- Assembly: Poland: Poznań (Volkswagen Poznań Sp. z o.o.)

Body and chassis
- Platform: Volkswagen Group MQB platform

Powertrain
- Engine: Petrol: 1.5 L EA211evo TSI I4 (114 hp); Petrol plug-in hybrid: 1.5 L TSI I4 and electric motor (combined 150 hp); Diesel: 2.0 L EA288evo TDI I4 (102/122 hp)
- Transmission: 6-speed DSG (PHEV); 6-speed manual

Dimensions
- Wheelbase: 2,755 mm (108.5 in); 2,975 mm (117.1 in) Maxi
- Length: 4,500 mm (177.2 in); 4,859 mm (191.3 in) Maxi
- Width: 1,855 mm (73.0 in)
- Height: 1,798 mm (70.8 in)
- Curb weight: 1,559–1,998 kg (3,437–4,405 lb)

The third-generation Tourneo Connect for the European market was released in October 2021 as a rebadged fourth-generation Volkswagen Caddy. In 2020, it was planned to launch The Caddy-based Transit Connect to Australasia in the second quarter of 2024.

The new Caddy-based Transit Connect has been released in the UK and Europe in late 2024.

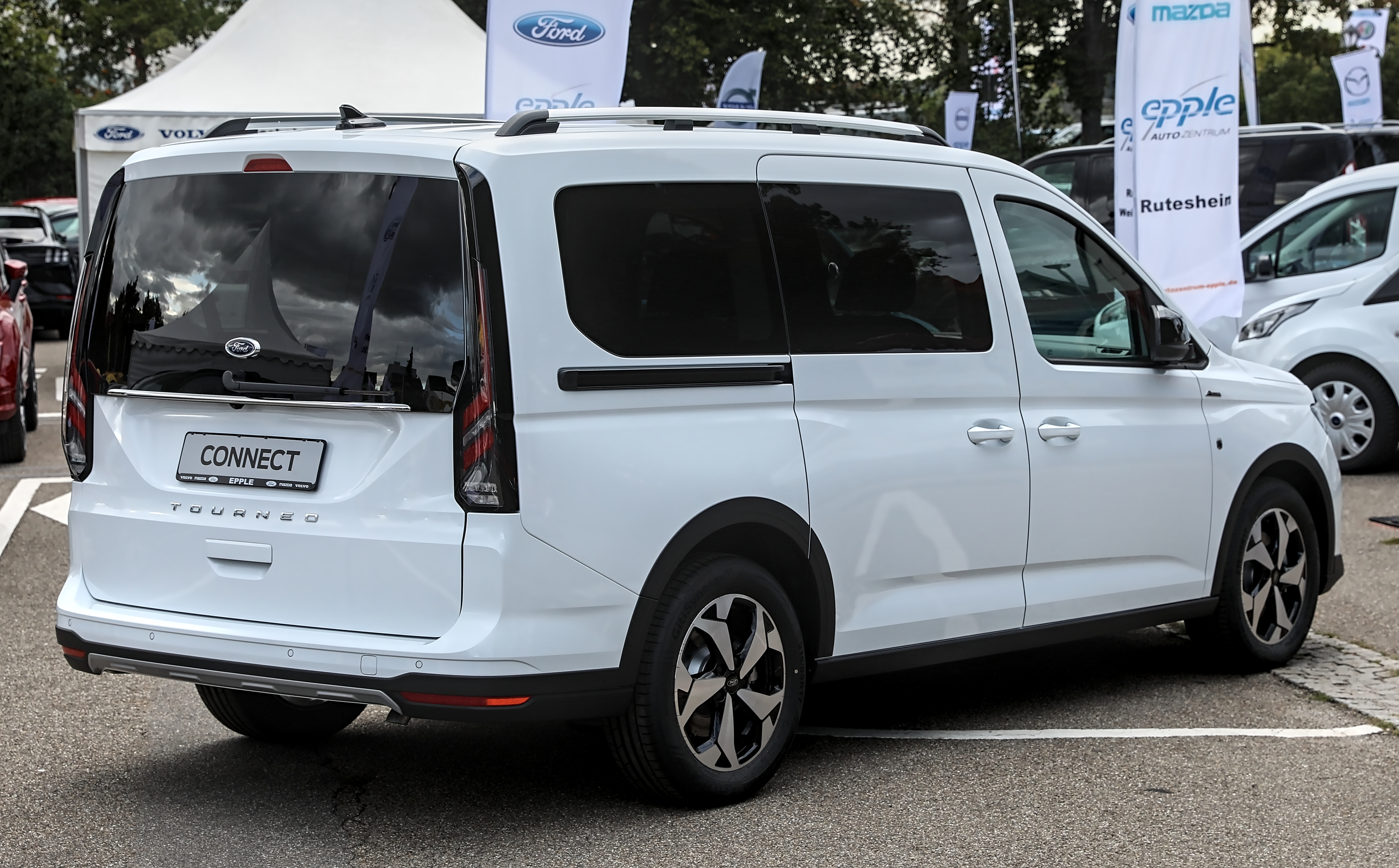
Rear view (Tourneo Connect)

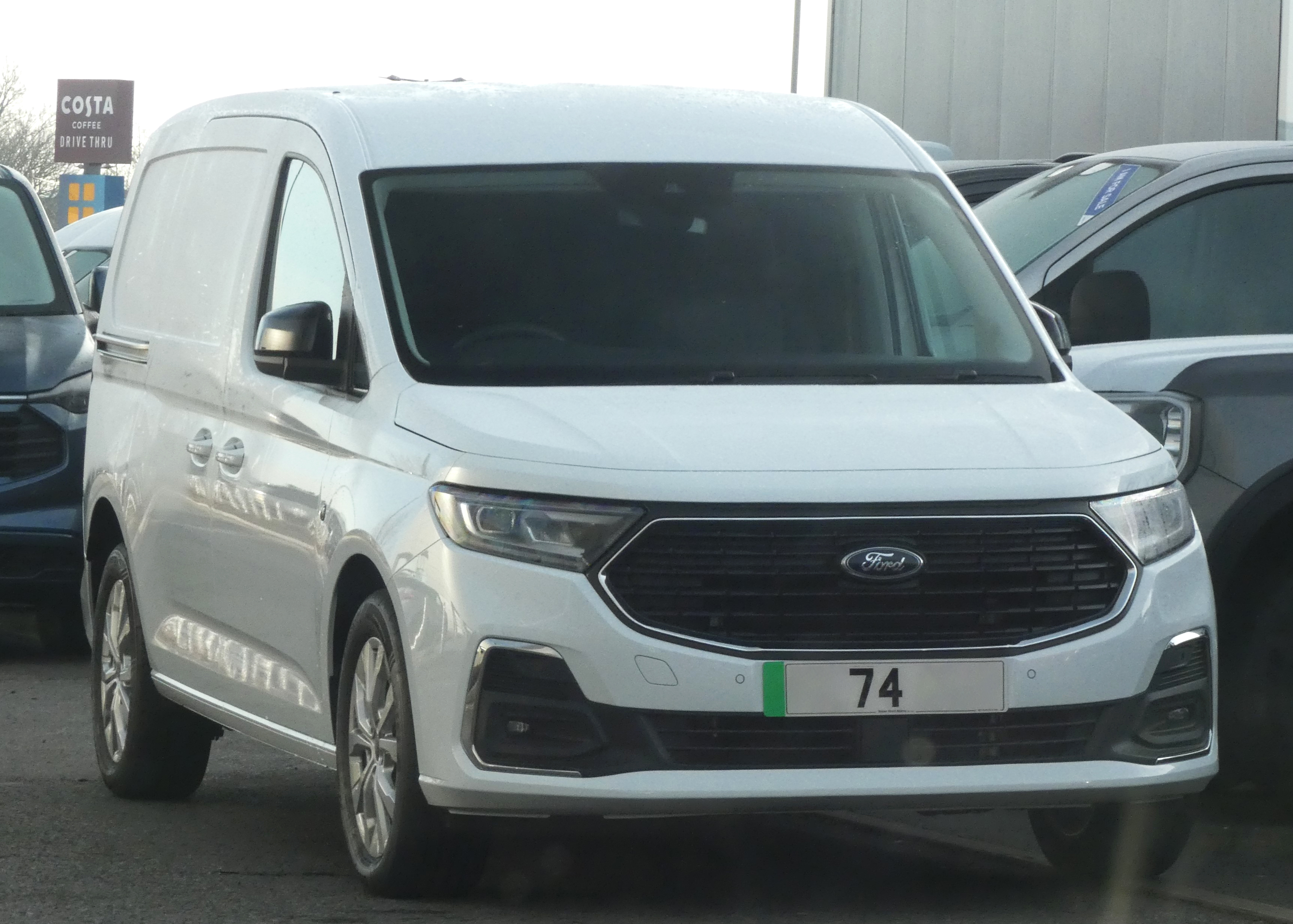
Front view (Transit Connect)

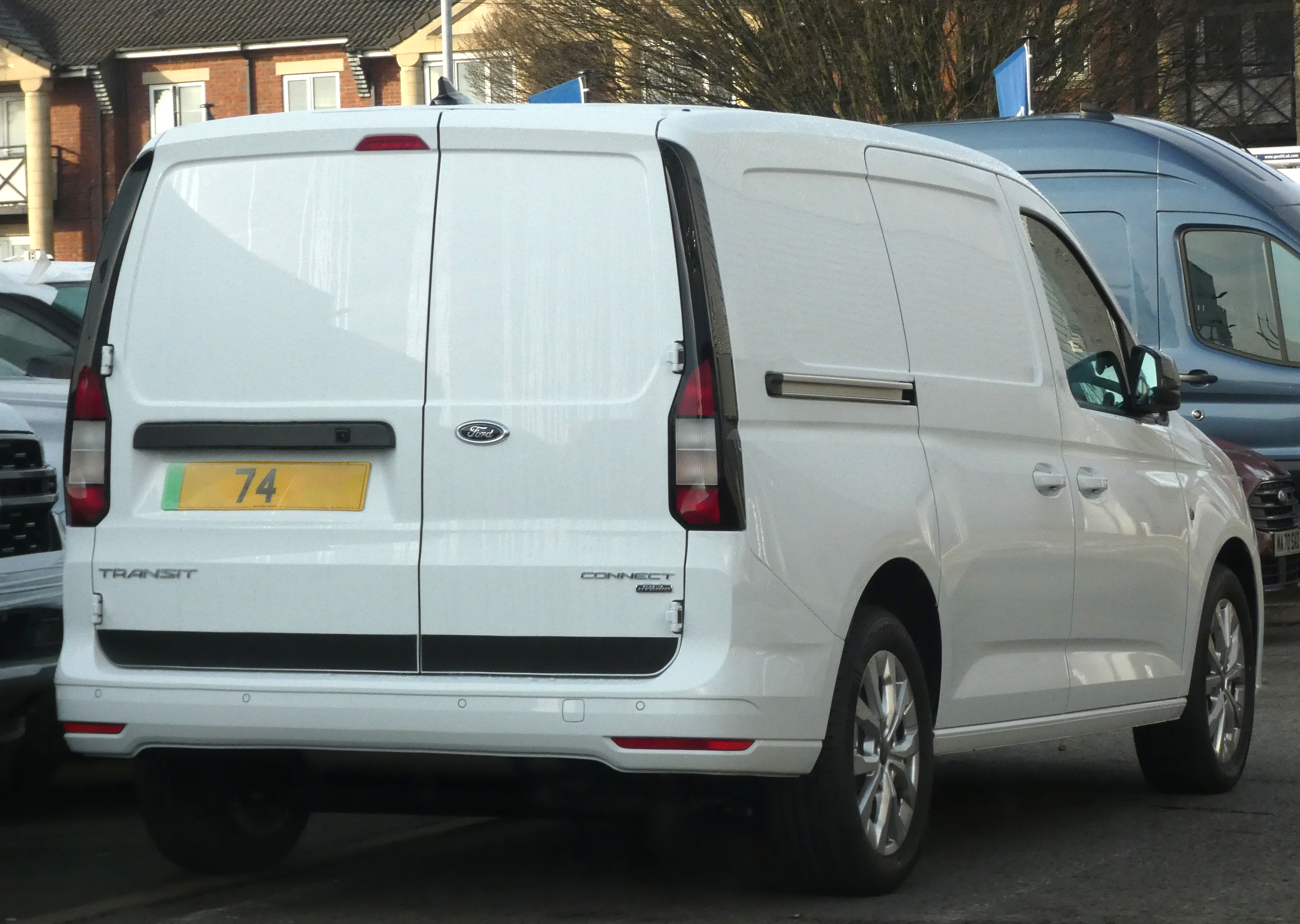
Rear view (Transit Connect)

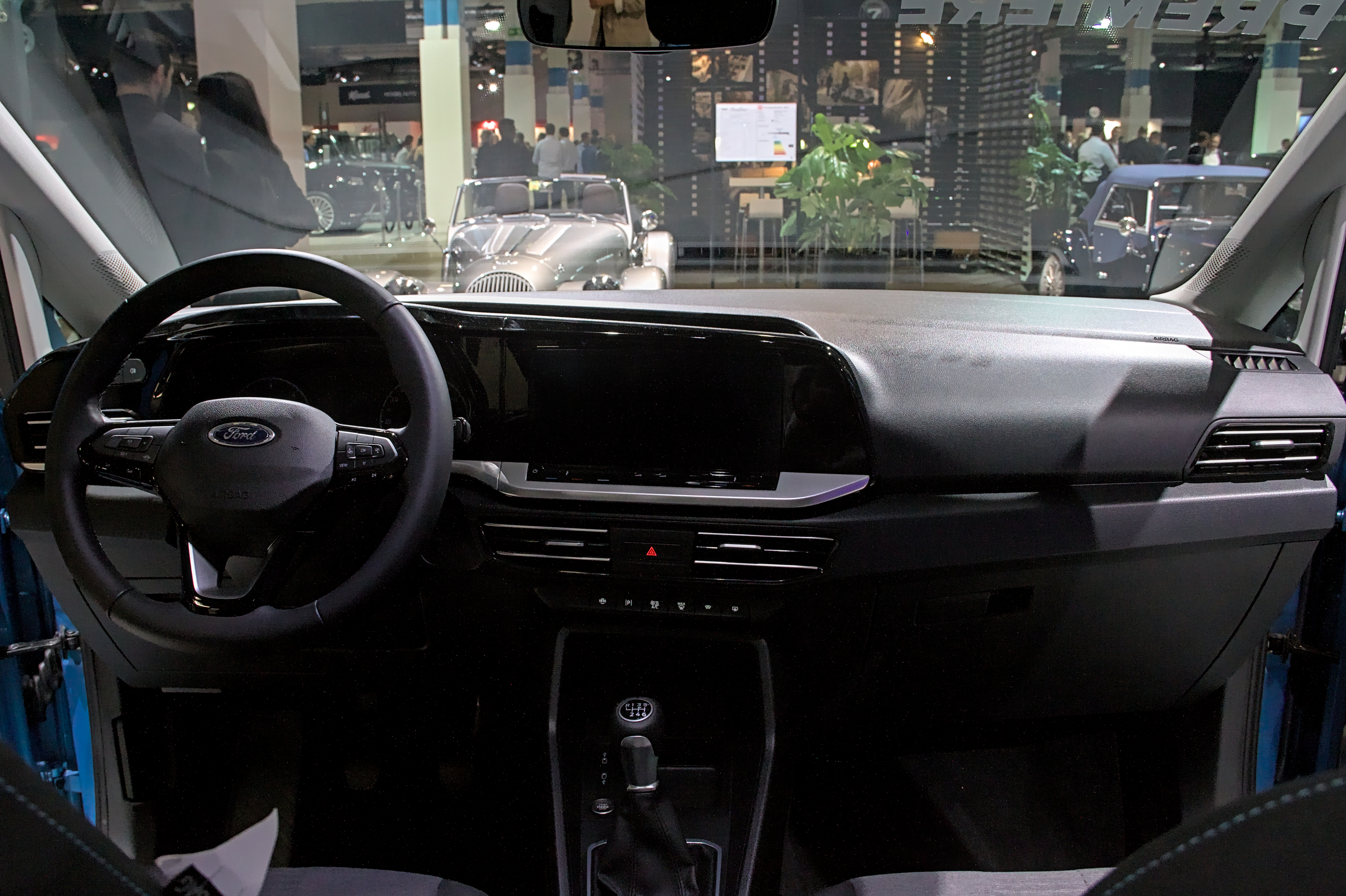
Interior

== Tariff circumvention ==
As the Transit Connect is a light truck assembled outside of North America, Ford imports the first and second-generation Transit Connect into the United States as a passenger vehicle, equipping it with rear side windows, rear seats (and rear seat belts) in an effort to circumvent the 25% tariff on imported light trucks, as imported passenger vehicles were subject to a lower 2.5% tariff. The first-generation vehicles were exported from Turkey to Baltimore on cargo ships owned by Wallenius Wilhelmsen Logistics. Upon their arrival, cargo examples of the Transit Connect were converted into commercial vehicles at a WWL Vehicle Services Americas Inc. facility. With the exception of Transit Connect Wagons, rear windows on Transit Connects were replaced by metal panels and rear seats/seatbelts were deleted; the removed parts were recycled.

The process exploited a perceived loophole in the customs definition of a commercial vehicle. As cargo does not need seats with seat belts or rear windows, presence of those items exempted the vehicle from commercial vehicle status. While the conversion cost Ford hundreds of dollars per vehicle, the company saved thousands of dollars over paying the tariff. To streamline the process, Ford only exported the long-wheelbase, high-roof Transit Connect to North America. With a height of 79 inches, the model line was only an inch lower than the lowest-height E-Series van, precluding its access to lower-height parking garages.

For the second generation of the model line, Ford shifted production of the model line from Turkey to Spain, but continued to rely on imported production as a source for the Transit Connect in North America. In 2013, US Customs told Ford that they must stop this practice of importing vans disguised as passenger cars. As of July 2018, Ford continued to employ the loophole but remained continuously in court over the practice. On 7 June 2019, the United States won its appeal in the Federal Appellate Court. The court determined that the Ford Transit Connect was a vehicle for the transportation of cargo.

Since 2019 production, the conversion process of Transit Connects has undergone major revision. While all vehicles are still imported from Spain as passenger vehicles and converted to cargo vans (a process that happens to approximately 85% of Transit Connects imported to North America), the conversion no longer involves the disposal/recycling of the removed parts; instead, the removed rear seats and rear window components are shipped back to Ford in Spain for reuse.

== Discontinuation in North America ==
Ford initially planned to release the third-generation Transit Connect in North America as a potential 2024 model. Alongside the redesign of the model line, production was to be relocated from Valencia, Spain, to Hermosillo Stamping and Assembly in Mexico, with Ford assembling a new Transit Connect along the Bronco Sport and the Maverick. The move would have ended all issues related to importation tariffs (as Mexico and Canada are exempt).

Though the model line held a significant market share of the small commercial van segment, it followed a significant decline of small van sales overall (coupled with the discontinuation of the Nissan NV200 and Mercedes-Benz Metris), leading Ford to end sales of the Transit Connect in North America after the 2023 model year. As of current production, the smallest Ford van sold in North America is the Transit T150 regular length, low-roof (the Transit Custom is not sold in the United States or Canada).

== Fleet usage ==
=== Grumman LLV replacement ===
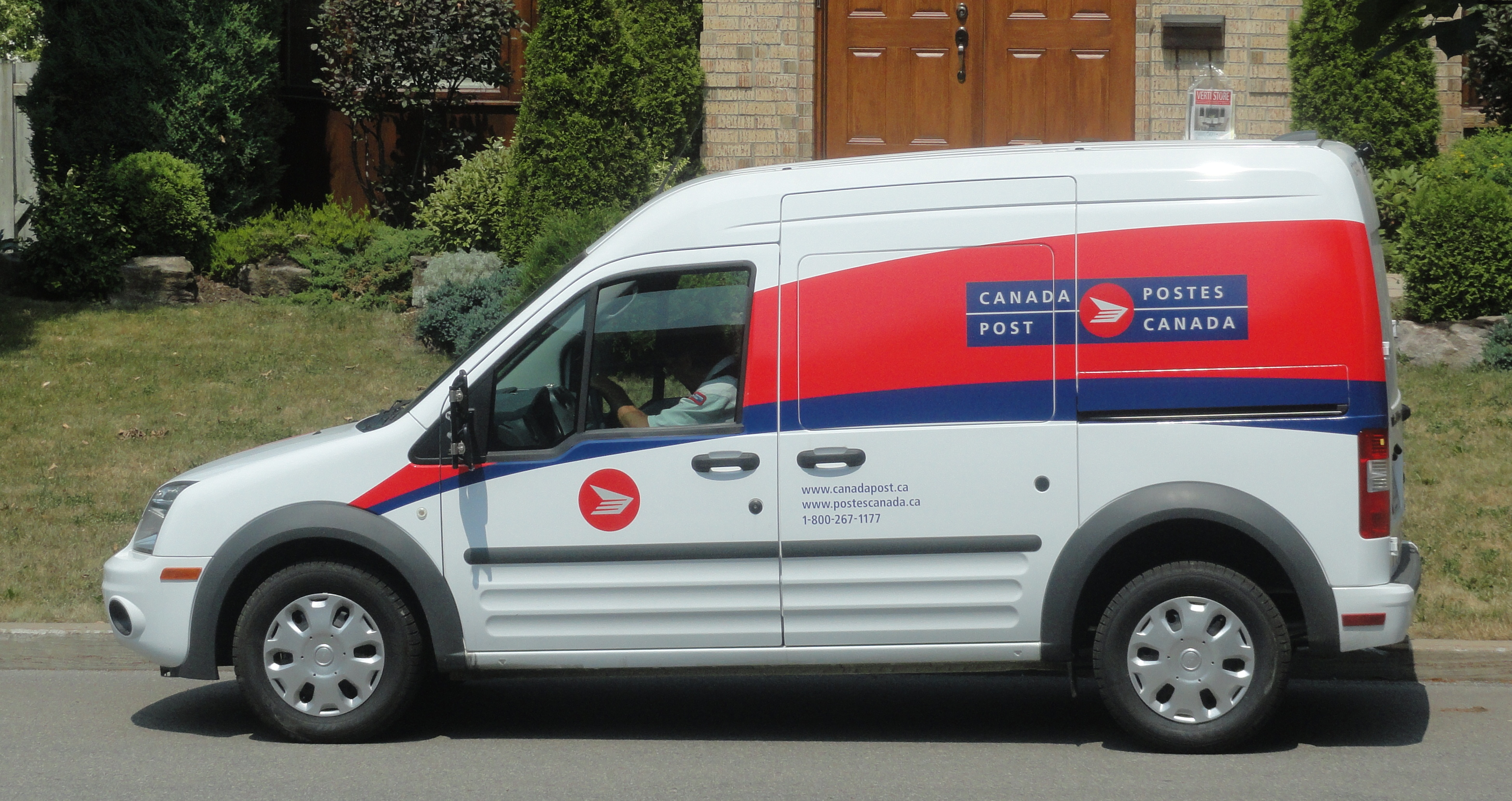
Ford Transit Connect of Canada Post

In 2010, Canada Post selected the Ford Transit Connect, purchasing a fleet of 1,175 units to replace a large portion of its Grumman LLV vehicles. In contrast to its LLV predecessor, the Canada Post Transit Connects are left-hand drive (though Ford does produce the Transit Connect for RHD markets).

=== Taxicab ===
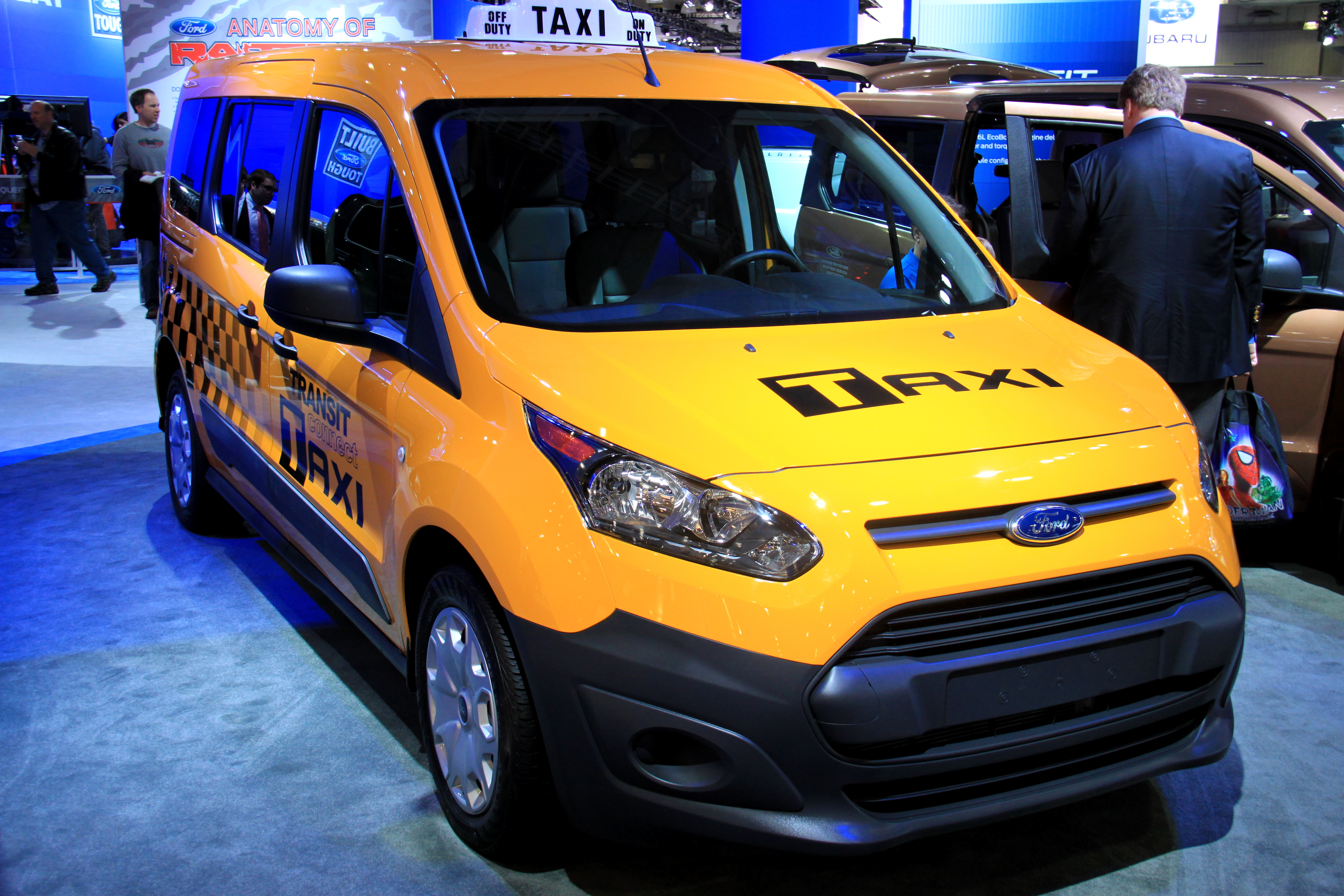
Ford Transit New York City's Taxi of Tomorrow.

In fleet (taxi) applications, Ford markets the Ford Transit Connect Wagon as a replacement for the Ford Crown Victoria P70 (discontinued in 2011). For taxi use, the rear seat is shifted several inches rearward (both to increase legroom and to allow fitment of a partition); a third-row seat is not offered. Other features include rear-seat climate controls and school bus yellow paint.

In 2011, the Transit Connect was rejected for the New York City Taxi of Tomorrow bid (a 10-year contract to replace the Crown Victoria exclusively); though a finalist, the Transit Connect lost to the Nissan NV200. During the 2010s, New York City adopted the Transit Connect as an accessible cab; it also has replaced the Crown Victoria in multiple large American municipalities with organized taxicab services.

== Variants ==
=== Transit Connect Electric ===
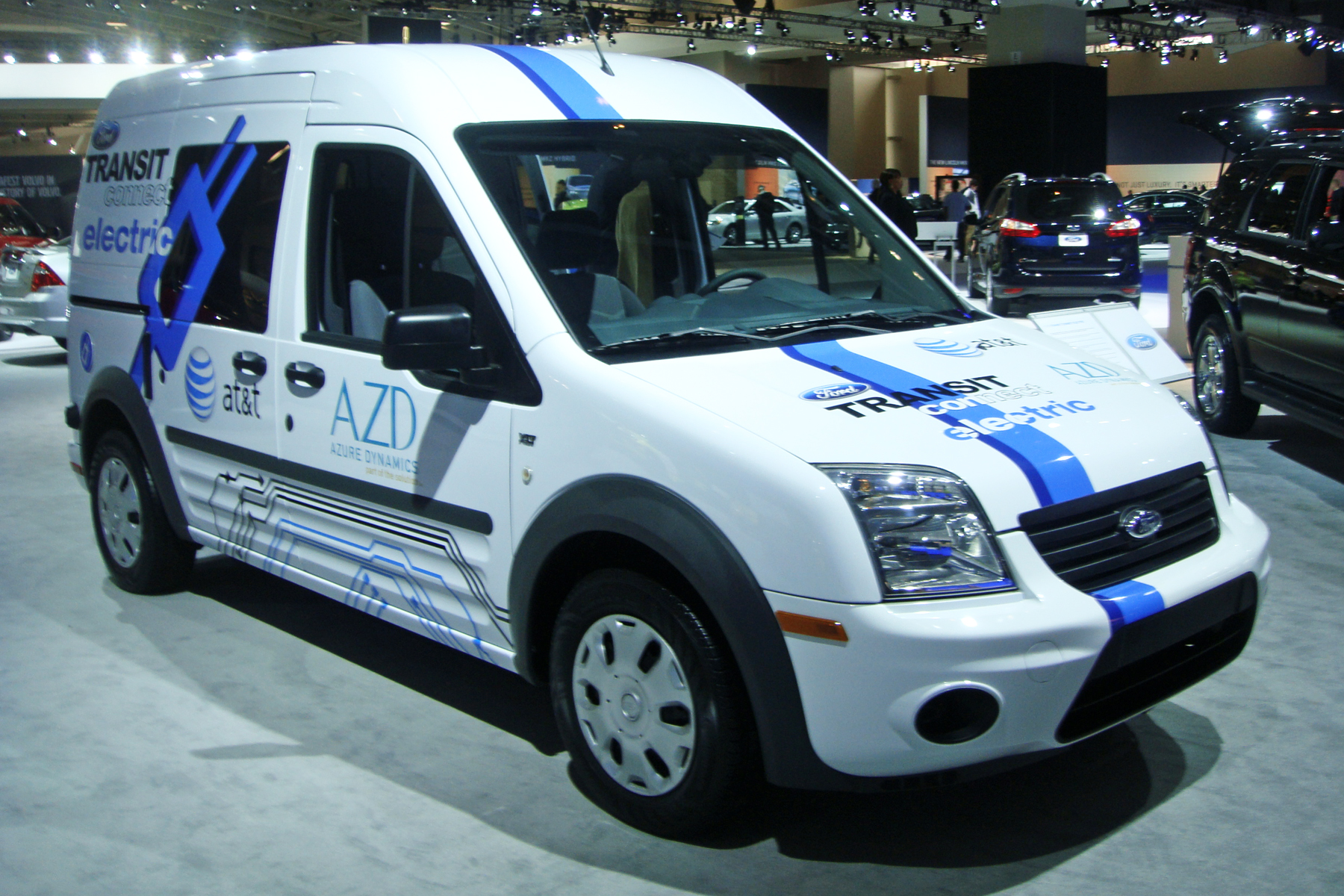
Ford Transit Connect Electric

At the 2009 Chicago Auto Show, Ford confirmed development of a battery-powered version of the Transit Connect. Later at the Geneva Auto Show the same year, Ford showed a prototype electric version of the Ford Tourneo Connect passenger van, which is closely related to the Ford Transit Connect. Ford originally announced Smith Electric Vehicles would install the electric drivetrains and lithium-ion battery packs in the vehicles, but Ford instead partnered with Azure Dynamics Corporation in October 2009, with Johnson Controls-Saft as the battery supplier.

Production of the Transit Connect Electric began in December 2010, and Azure Dynamics is the official manufacturer of record. The official US Environmental Protection Agency range is 56 mi (90 km) and has a combined city/highway fuel economy rating of 62 miles per gallon gasoline equivalent (3.8 L/100 km equivalent) based on the five-cycle tests using varying driving conditions and climate controls.

In 2010, the electric van cost US$57,400, which more than doubled the price of the gas-powered version even after federal and any state or local incentives for electric vehicles were discounted.

=== Transit Connect X-Press ===
In 2004, Ford of Europe created the Ford Transit Connect X-Press, based upon a pre-production Transit Connect prototype and a 212 hp 2.0L engine of the Ford Focus RS. Using a short-wheelbase cargo van with a rear liftgate, the X-Press is fitted with the front suspension, four-wheel disc brakes, and steering of the Focus RS. The cargo bay is fitted with a full-body roll cage along with two spare tires.

During 2006, the Transit Connect X-Press saw minor exterior changes to better reflect the production vehicle.

=== Tourneo Connect ===
The Ford Tourneo Connect is a leisure activity vehicle produced by Ford, which was first put into production in 2002 to the British market. Much like the Tourneo is a passenger version of the Transit, the Tourneo Connect was designed with rear windows and seats. Principally termed a commercial vehicle, Ford predicted relatively low sales of between 800 and 1000 mainly to taxi operators, due to its given status as a commercial vehicle. However, Ford described the Connect as a 'dual use' vehicle, equally able to meet business and leisure needs. It was put into production to rival the similar models of the Renault Kangoo, Mercedes Citan, Citroën Berlingo, Peugeot Partner, Volkswagen Caddy, Fiat Doblò and the Opel/Vauxhall Combo Tour.

The Connect, when first sold, was the only vehicle of its kind to offer folding and separately removable 60/40 split rear seats that allowed multiple seating formations and increased load capacity. It also boasted the option of twin sliding side load doors as well as rear doors or a tailgate, whereas neither of its main competitors had this option.

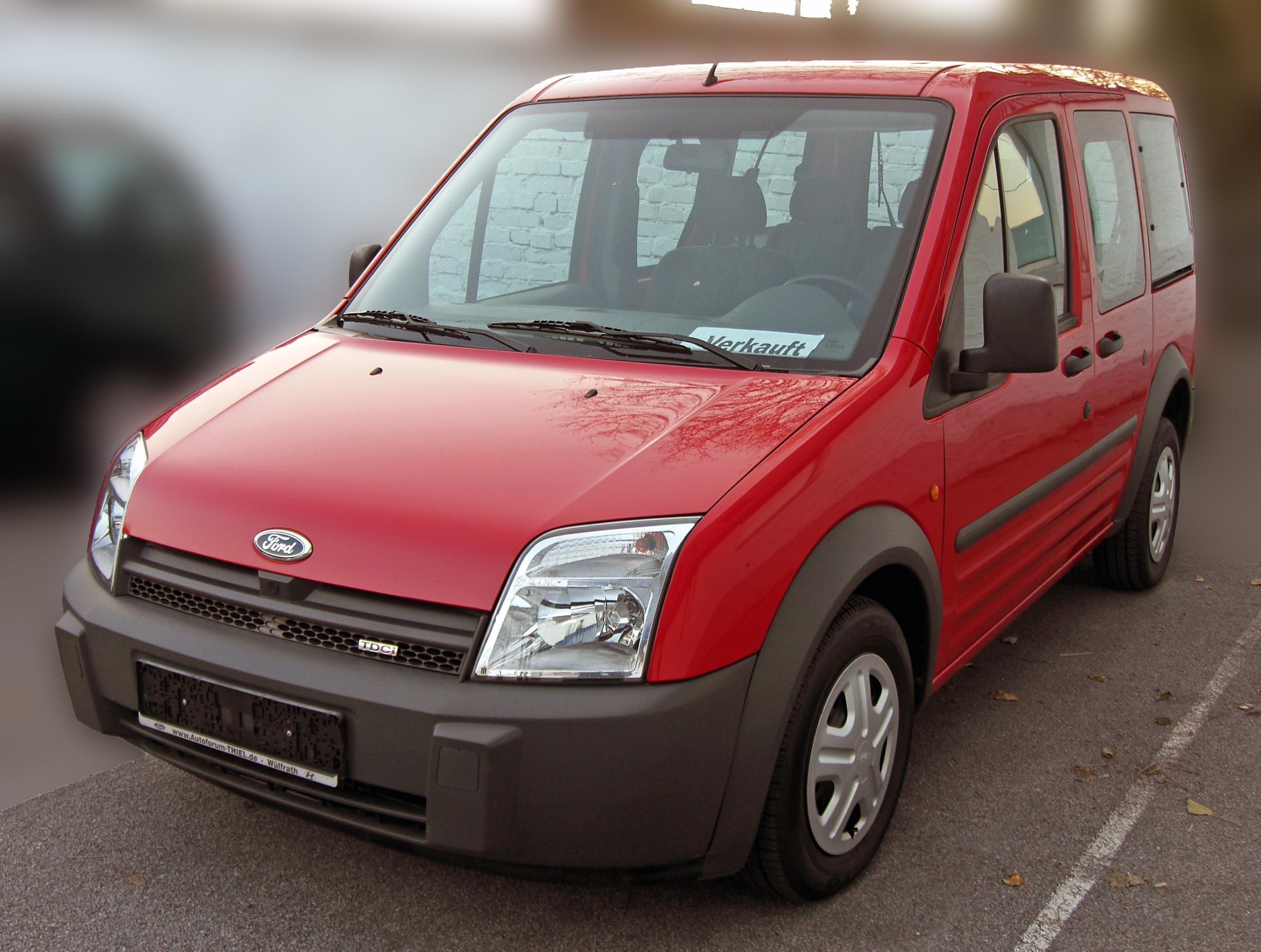
First generation Tourneo Connect

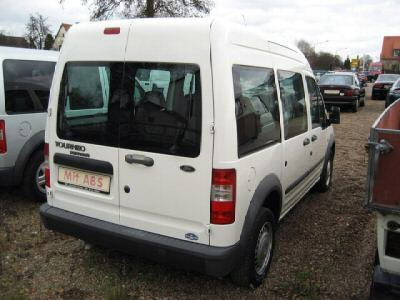
First generation Tourneo Connect, rear

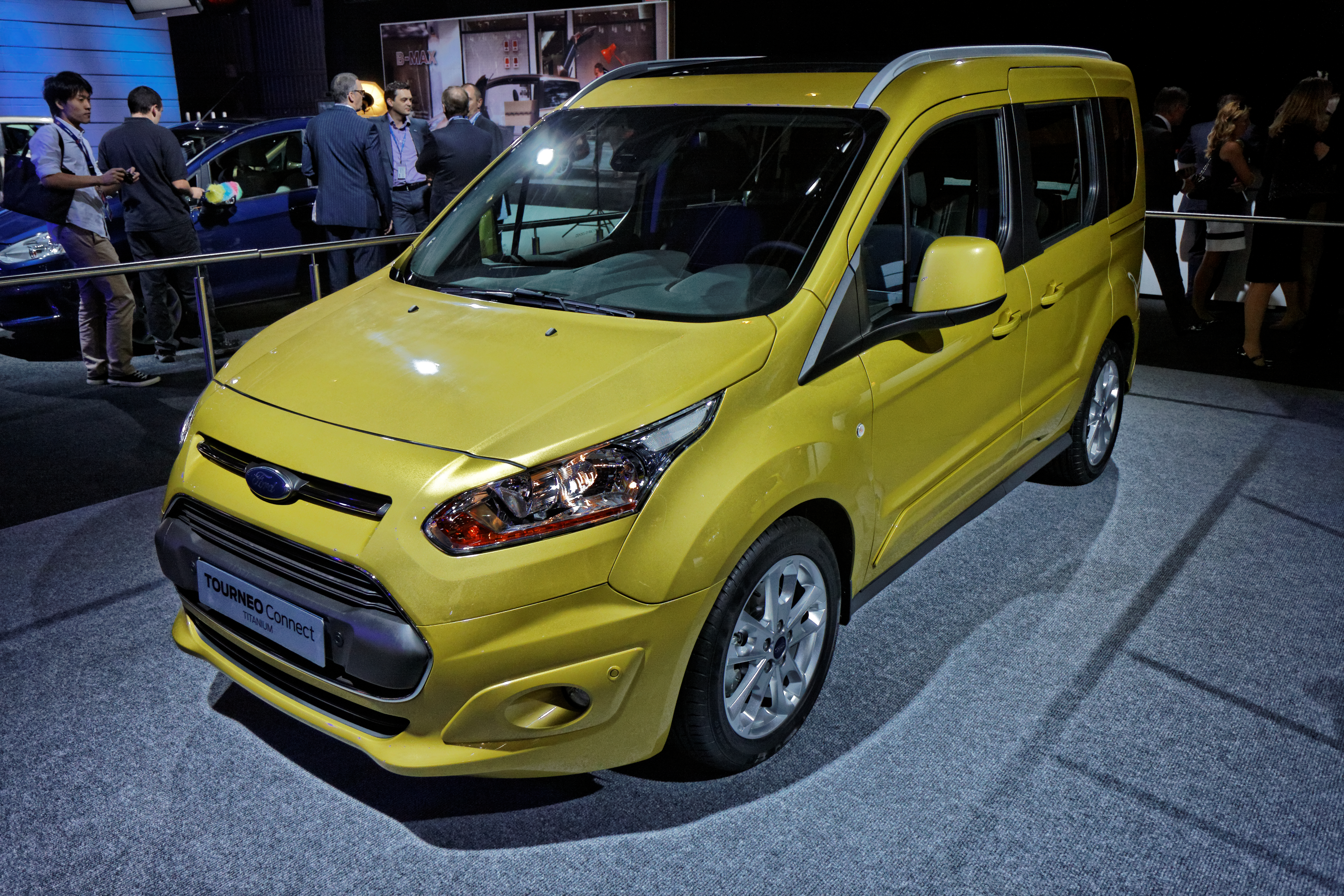
Ford Tourneo Connect, second generation

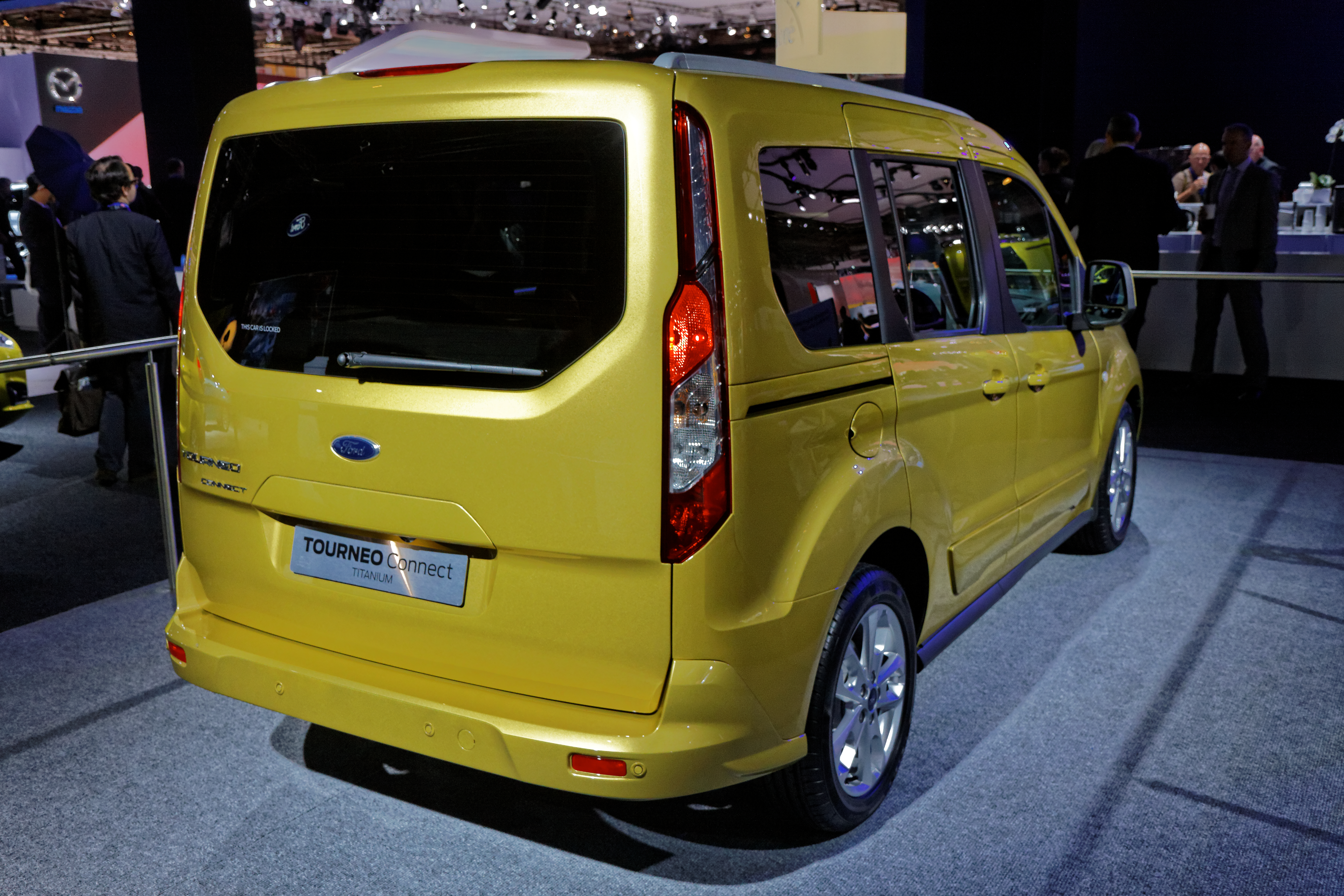
Ford Tourneo Connect, second generation (rear)

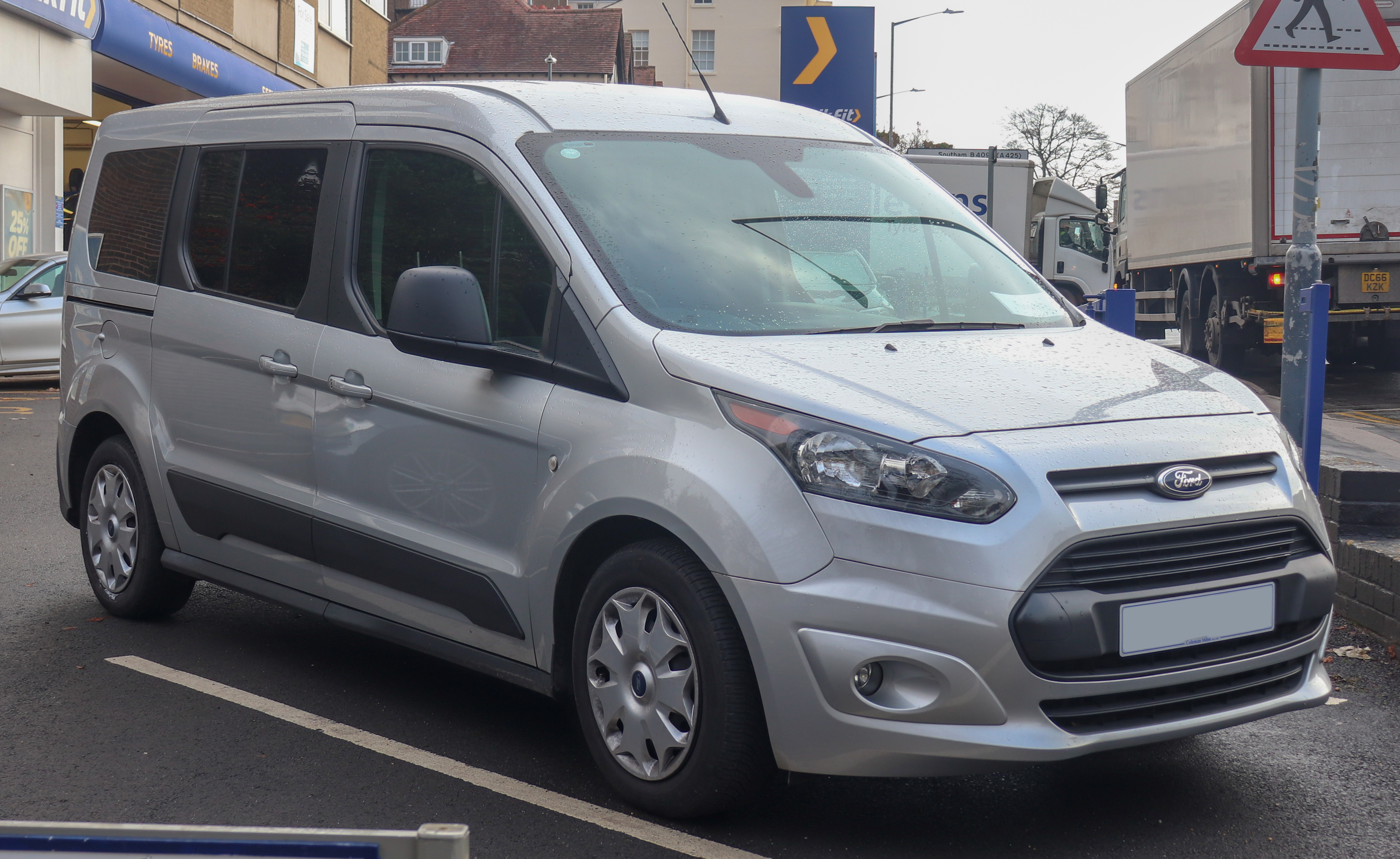
2015 Ford Grand Tourneo (LWB)

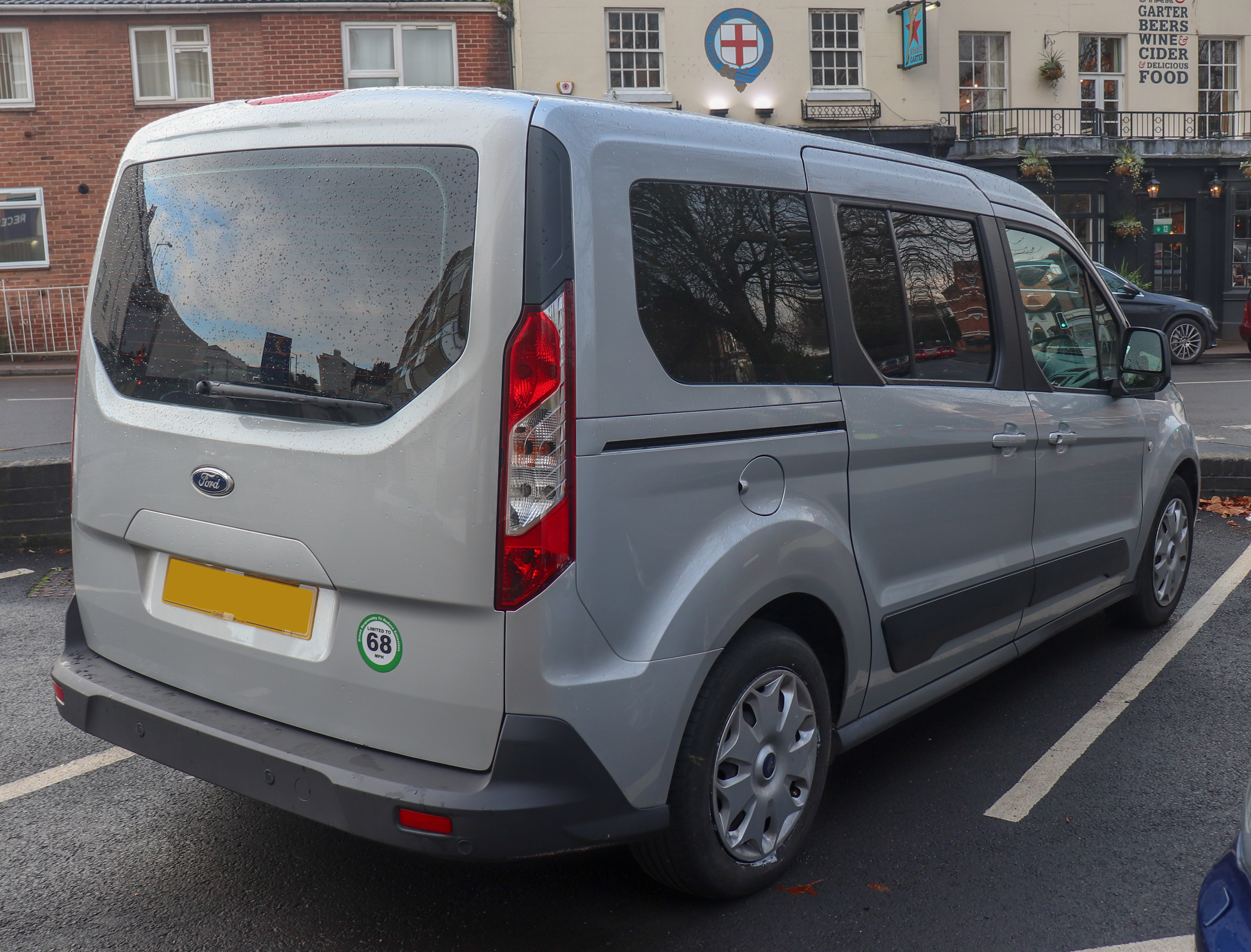
2015 Ford Grand Tourneo, rear (LWB)

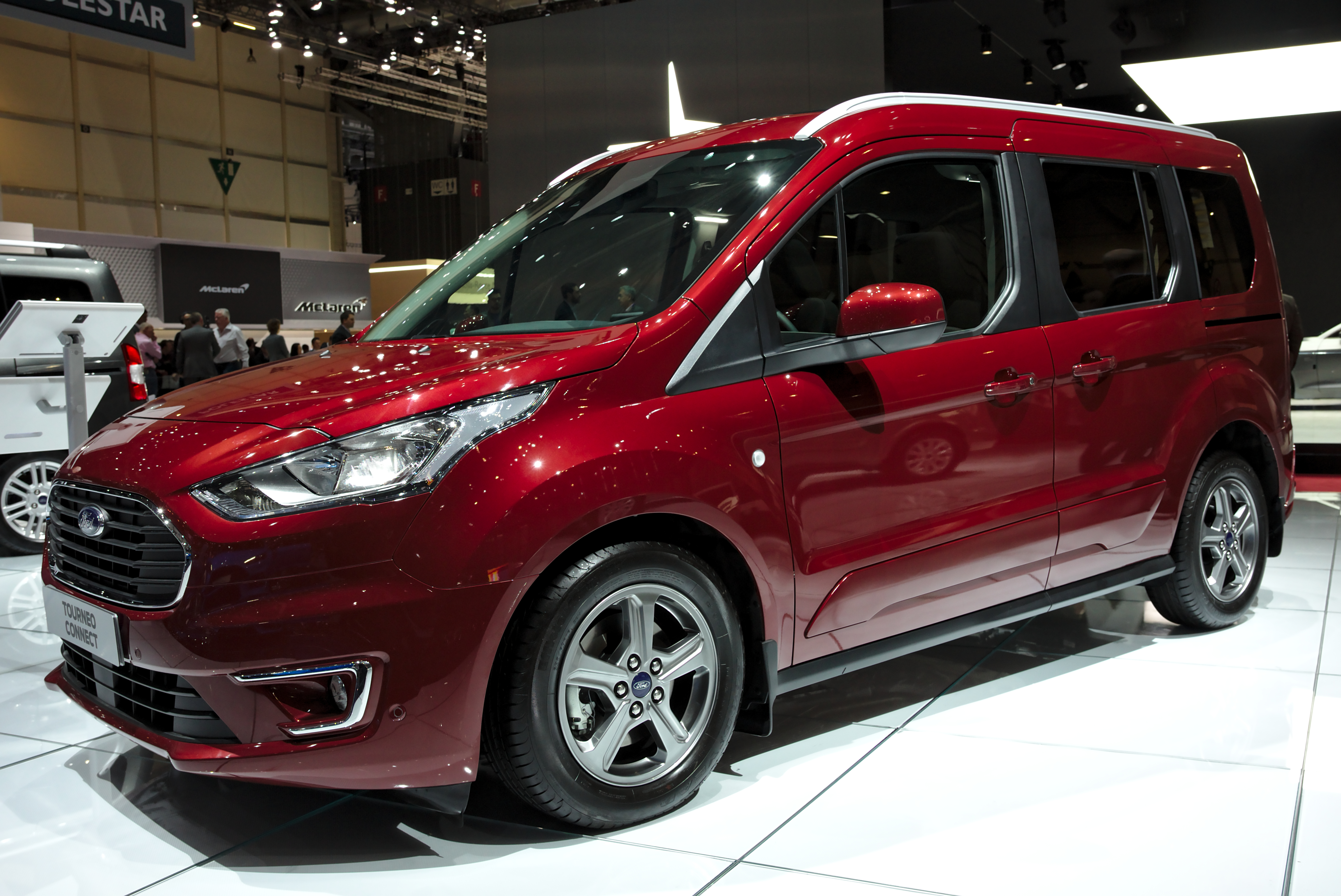
Ford Tourneo Connect, facelift

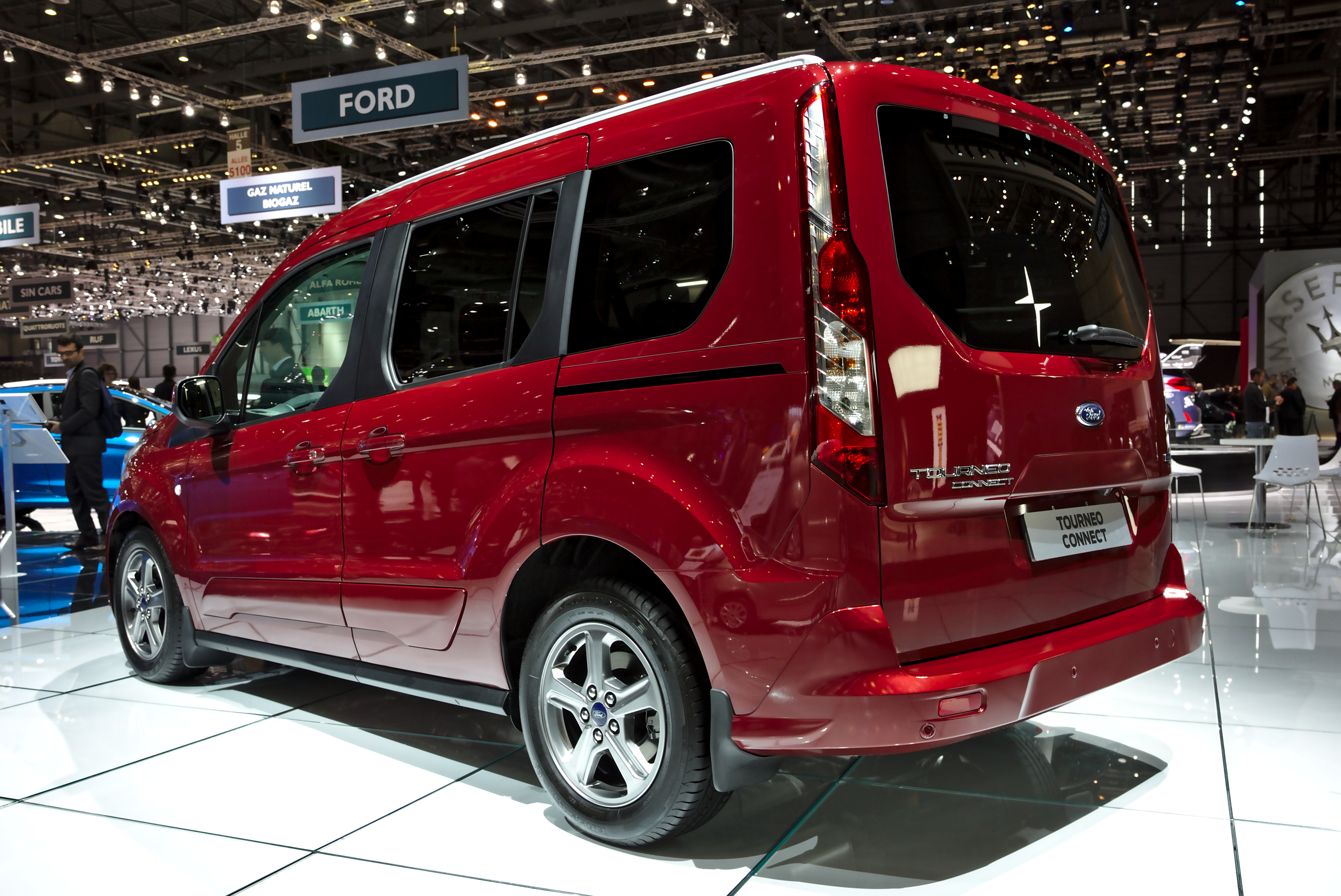
Ford Tourneo Connect, facelift (rear)

==== Electric ====
Ford presented the Ford Tourneo Connect battery electric concept vehicle at the 2009 Geneva Motor Show. It features a 21 kWh lithium iron phosphate battery pack, a 50 kW permanent magnet motor, and a single-speed transmission, for a range of up to 160 kilometres (99 mi) and top speed of about 113 kilometres per hour (70 mph). Its BEV technology was developed in collaboration with Smith Electric Vehicles.

== Sales ==
Calendar year	U.S.
2009	8,834
2010	27,405
2011	31,914
2012	37,521
2013	39,703
2014	43,210
2015	52,221
2016	43,232
2017	34,473
2018	31,923
2019	41,598
2020	34,596
2021	26,112
2022	25,140
2023	18,050
Total	495,932
