= Chicken Tax =

American tariff on light trucks in effect since 1964

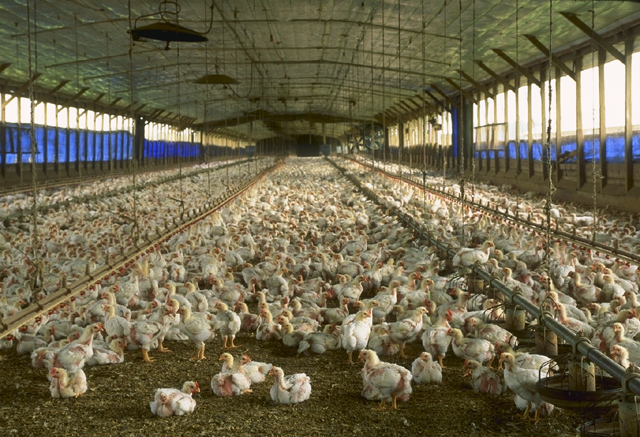
U.S. intensive chicken farming led to the 1961–1964 "Chicken War" with Europe.

The Chicken Tax is a 25% tariff on imports of light trucks (and originally also on potato starch, dextrin, and brandy) into the United States that has been in effect since 1964. It was imposed under President Lyndon B. Johnson in response to tariffs placed by France and West Germany on importation of U.S. chicken. The period from 1961 to 1964 of tensions and negotiations surrounding the issue was known as the "Chicken War", taking place at the height of Cold War politics.

Eventually, the tariffs on potato starch, dextrin, and brandy were lifted, but since 1964 this form of protectionism has remained in place to give US domestic automakers an advantage over imported competitors. Though concern remains about its repeal, a 2003 Cato Institute study called the tariff "a policy in search of a rationale."

As an unintended consequence, several importers of light trucks have circumvented the tariff via loopholes, known as tariff engineering. For example, Ford, which was one of the main beneficiaries of the tax, also evaded it by manufacturing first-generation Transit Connect light trucks for the US market in Turkey; these Transits were fitted-out as passenger vehicles, which allowed Ford to evade the Chicken Tax when the vehicles passed customs in the US. The Transits were stripped pre-sale of their rear seats and seat belts. Similarly, to import cargo vans built in Germany, Mercedes-Benz disassembled fully-completed vehicles and shipped the components to "a small kit assembly building" in South Carolina, where they were reassembled. The resulting vehicles emerged as locally manufactured, free from the tariff. Several such loopholes were subsequently closed by the U.S. Customs and Border Protection. Light trucks manufactured in Mexico and Canada, such as the Ram series of trucks manufactured in Saltillo, Mexico, and Canadian-built Chevrolet truck models, are not subject to the tax under the North American Free Trade Agreement, and from July 1, 2020, the United States–Mexico–Canada Agreement.

== Background ==
One columnist for Atlantic Monthly took the occasion to bemoan the effect of industrialized chicken production on the quality of the chicken that the United States was exporting, calling it a "battery-bred, chemically fed, sanitized, porcelain-finished, money-back-if-you-can-taste-it bird." A cartoon accompanying the column portrays chicken being fed into a machine—the "Instofreezo Automatic Food Processor, Packager & Deflavorizer, A Product of the U.S.A." A production executive stands atop the machine, as it pumps out cubes of generic chicken food product, which threaten to engulf the globe.

— Carl Weinberg, Big Dixie Chicken Goes Global: Exports and the North Georgia Poultry Industry, 2003

Largely because of post–World War II intensive chicken farming and accompanying price reductions, chicken, once internationally synonymous with luxury, became a staple food in the U.S. Before the early 1960s, not only had chicken remained prohibitively expensive in Europe, but it had also remained a delicacy. With imports of inexpensive chicken from the U.S., chicken prices fell quickly and sharply across Europe, radically affecting European chicken consumption. In 1961, per capita chicken consumption rose up to 23% in West Germany. U.S. chicken captured nearly half of the imported European chicken market.

Subsequently, the Dutch accused the U.S. of dumping chickens at prices below cost of production. The French government banned U.S. chicken and raised concerns that hormones could affect male virility. German farmers' associations accused U.S. poultry firms of fattening chicken artificially with arsenic.

Coming on the heels of a "crisis in trade relations between the U.S. and the Common Market," the European Economic Community (EEC) moved ahead with tariffs, intending that they would encourage Europe's postwar agricultural self-sufficiency. European markets began setting chicken price controls. France introduced the higher tariff first, persuading West Germany to join them—even while the French hoped to win a larger share of the profitable West German chicken market after excluding U.S. chicken. The EEC adopted the Common Agricultural Policy, imposing minimum import prices on all imported chicken and nullifying prior tariff bindings and concessions.

Beginning in 1962, the U.S. accused the EEC of unfairly restricting imports of American poultry. By August 1962, U.S. exporters had lost 25% of their European chicken sales. Losses to the U.S. poultry industry were estimated at $26—$28 million (equivalent to $276.73—$298.02 million in 2025).

Senator J. William Fulbright, chairman of the Senate Foreign Relations Committee and Democratic Senator from Arkansas, a chief U.S. poultry-producing state, interrupted a NATO debate on nuclear armament to protest trade sanctions on U.S. chicken, going so far as to threaten cutting U.S. troops in NATO. Konrad Adenauer, then Chancellor of West Germany, later reported that President John F. Kennedy and he had a great deal of correspondence over a period of two years, about Berlin, Laos, the Bay of Pigs Invasion, "and I guess that about half of it has been about chickens."

== Diplomacy failure and the UAW ==
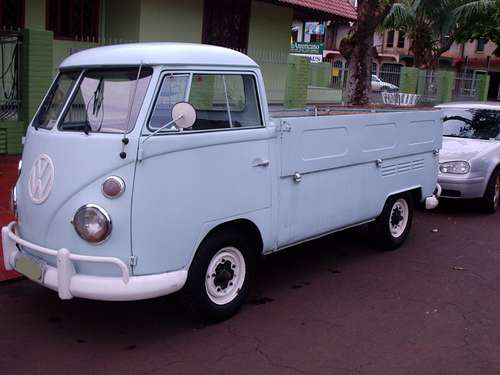
U.S. sales of Volkswagen Type 2 vans in pickup and commercial configurations were curtailed by the Chicken Tax.

Diplomacy failed after 18 months, and on December 4, 1963, President Johnson imposed a 25% tax (almost 10 times the average U.S. tariff) by executive order (Proclamation 3564) on potato starch, dextrin, brandy, and light trucks, effective from 7 January 1964.

With Johnson's proclamation, the U.S. had invoked its right under the General Agreement on Tariffs and Trade (GATT), whereby an offended nation may increase tariffs by an amount equal to losses from discriminating tariffs. Officially, the tax targeted items imported from Europe approximating the value of lost American chicken sales to Europe.

In retrospect, audio tapes from the Johnson White House revealed a quid pro quo unrelated to chicken. In January 1964, President Johnson attempted to convince United Auto Workers' president Walter Reuther not to initiate a strike just before the 1964 election and to support the president's civil-rights platform. Reuther, in turn, wanted Johnson to respond to Volkswagen's increased shipments to the United States.

The Chicken Tax directly curtailed importation of West German-built Volkswagen Type 2s in configurations that qualified them as light trucks, that is, commercial vans and pickups.

In 1964, U.S. imports of "automobile trucks" from West Germany declined to a value of US$5.7 million—about one-third the value imported in the previous year (equivalent to $59.17 million in 2025). Soon after, Volkswagen cargo vans and pickup trucks, the intended targets, "practically disappeared from the U.S. market."

VW Type 2s were not the only vehicle line affected. As a direct result of the Chicken Tax, Japanese automakers Toyota (with its Publica, Crown, and Corona coupé utilities), Datsun (Sunny truck), Isuzu (Wasp), and Mazda (Familia), which were selling pickup trucks, coupé utility vehicles, and panel deliveries in the US at the time, pulled these models out of the North American and Caribbean markets and did not bring over many models sold elsewhere.

== Ramifications ==
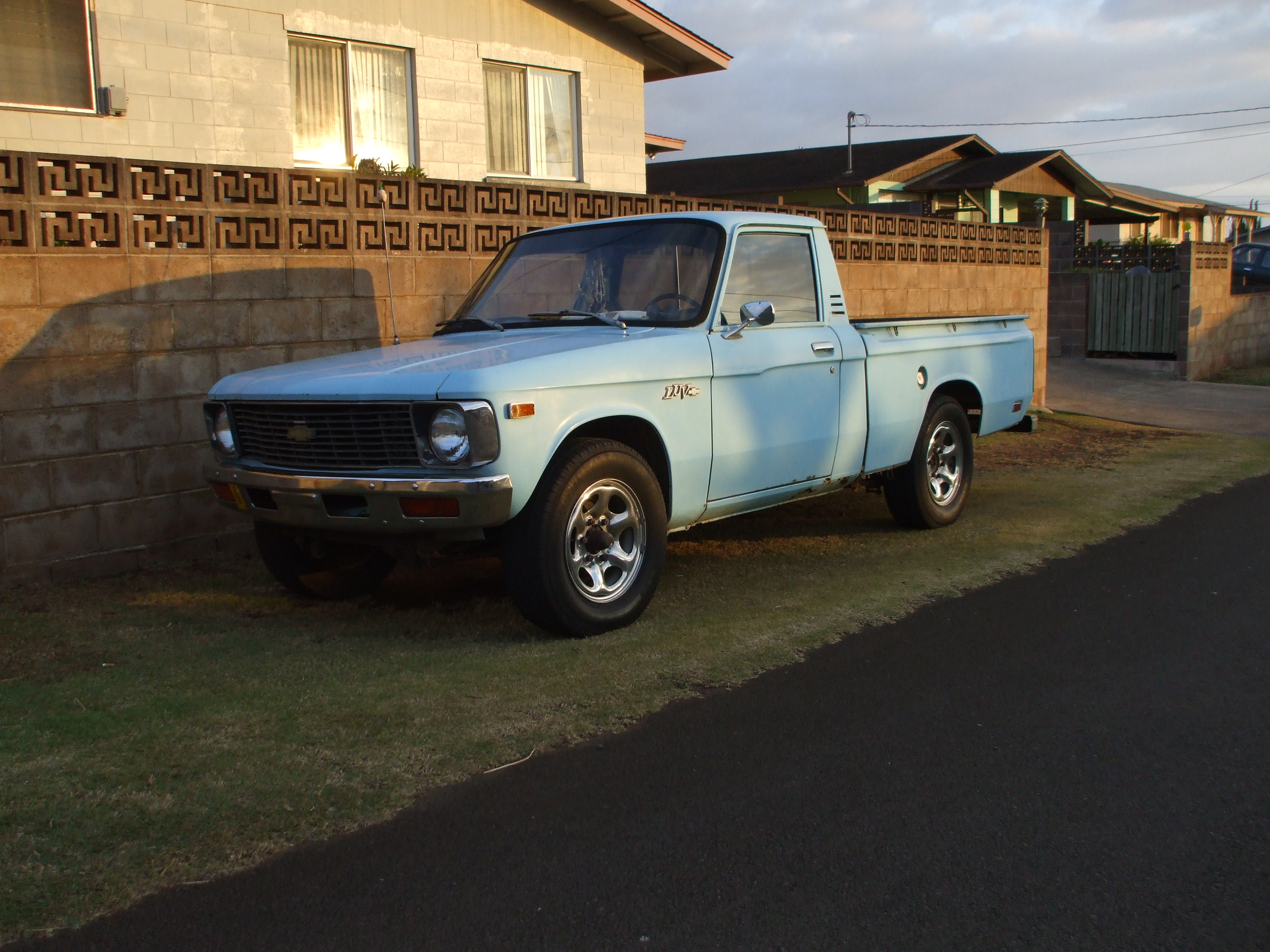
Chevrolet LUV: imported from 1972 to 1980 in chassis-cab configuration (less truck bed) to circumvent the Chicken Tax

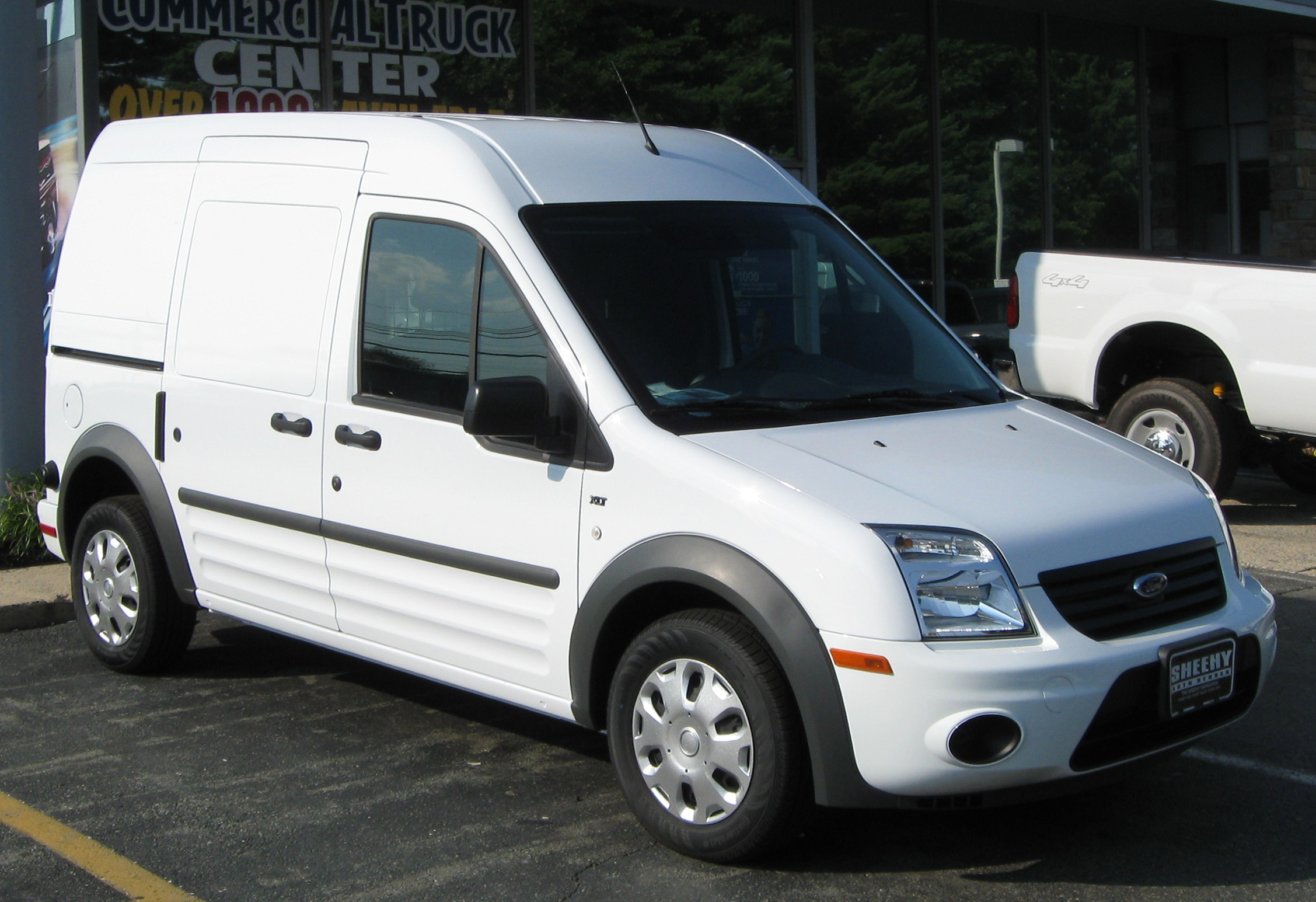
U.S.-bound Ford Transit Connect: pieces of its interior were shredded to circumvent the Chicken Tax

The tariff affected any country seeking to bring light trucks into the U.S. and effectively "squeezed smaller Asian truck companies out of the American pickup market." Over the intervening years, Detroit lobbied to protect the light-truck tariff, thereby reducing pressure on Detroit to introduce vehicles that polluted less and that offered increased fuel economy.

As of March 2023, the 1964 tariff of 25% remains levied on imported light trucks. Robert Z. Lawrence, professor of international trade and investment at Harvard University, contends the tax crippled the U.S. automobile industry by insulating it from real competition in light trucks for 40 years.

As of 2025, the Ineos Grenadier Quartermaster is the only imported truck sold in the US that is subject to the Chicken Tax.

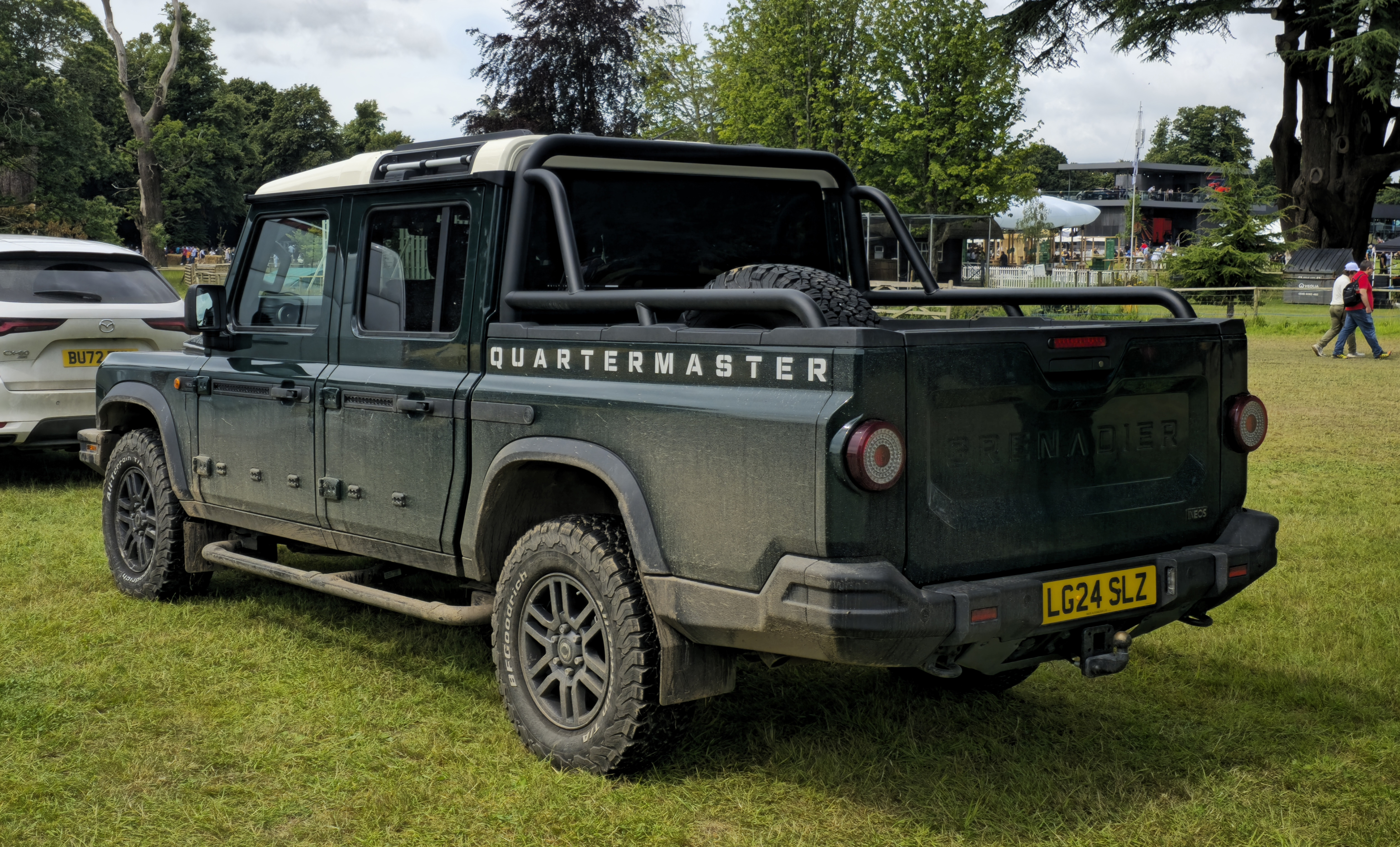
The Ineos Grenadier Quartermaster is the only truck currently subject to the Chicken Tax

=== Circumventing the tariff ===
Japanese manufacturers initially found they could export "chassis cab" configurations (which included the entire light truck, less the cargo box or truck bed) with only a 4% tariff. A truck bed would subsequently be attached to the chassis in the United States and the vehicle could be sold as a light truck.

In this manner, Toyota, which at the time had a very small percentage of the small pickup market, arranged satellite facilities to manufacture pickup beds which were mated at ports around the country to partially completed vehicles, i.e., without pickup beds and therefore not technically trucks, that had been imported from Japan — a process that would ultimately play a crucial role in the company's significant growth in the small truck market. In the highly orchestrated process, Toyota used a network of 15 fabricators to stamp, weld, and paint the truck beds, facilitated by very limited paint colors.

Other similar examples included the Chevrolet LUV and Ford Courier. From 1978 to 1987, the Subaru BRAT carried two rear-facing seats (with seatbelts and carpeting) in its rear bed to secure classification as a "passenger vehicle" and not as a light truck. The "chassis-cab" loophole was closed in 1980.

The U.S. Customs Service changed vehicle classifications in 1989, automatically relegating two-door SUVs to light-truck status. Toyota, Nissan, Suzuki (through a joint venture with GM), and Honda eventually built assembly plants in the U.S. and Canada in response to the tariff.

From 2001 to 2006, cargo van versions of the Mercedes and Dodge Sprinter were manufactured in assembly kit form in Düsseldorf, Germany, then shipped to a factory in Gaffney, South Carolina, for final assembly with a proportion of locally sourced parts complementing the imported components. The cargo versions would have been subject to the tax if imported as complete units, thus the importation in knock-down kit form for U.S. assembly.

Ford imported all of its first-generation Ford Transit Connect models as "passenger vehicles" by including rear windows, rear seats, and rear seat belts. The vehicles were exported from Turkey on ships owned by Wallenius Wilhelmsen Logistics (WWL), arrived in Baltimore, and were converted back into light trucks at WWL's Vehicle Services Americas, Inc. facility by replacing rear windows with metal panels and removing the rear seats and seat belts. The removed parts were not shipped back to Turkey for reuse, but shredded and recycled in Ohio. The process exploited the loophole in the customs definition of a light truck; as cargo does not need seats with seat belts or rear windows, presence of those items automatically qualified the vehicle as a "passenger vehicle" and exempted the vehicle from "light truck" status. The process cost Ford hundreds of dollars per van, but saved thousands in taxes. U.S. Customs and Border Protection estimated that, between 2002 and 2018, the practice saved Ford $250 million in tariffs.

Customs and Border Protection (CBP) ruled in 2013 that Transit Connects imported by Ford as passenger wagons and later converted into cargo vans should be subject to the 25% duty rate applicable to vans and not to the 2.5% rate applicable to passenger vehicles. Ford sued and finally, in 2020, the Supreme Court declined to hear the case which confirmed the position of CBP. In 2024, Ford reached a settlement with the United States Department of Justice, agreeing to pay $365 million in tariffs and penalties.

Chrysler introduced the Ram ProMaster City, an Americanized version of the Fiat Doblò, in 2015—building the vehicle at the Tofaş plant in Turkey, importing only passenger configurations and subsequently converting cargo configurations.

In 2009, Mahindra & Mahindra Limited announced that it would export pickup trucks from India in knock-down kit form, again to circumvent the tax. These were complete vehicles that could be assembled in the U.S. from kits of parts shipped in crates. The export plans were later cancelled.

Nissan avoided the 25% Chicken Tax by producing its popular NV200 small front-wheel-drive cargo van in its Cuernevaca assembly plant in Mexico in 2013 for the North American market; Chevrolet sold a rebadged version as the "City Express" for the 2015–2018 model years. NV200 production ended in summer 2021. Pricing was considerably less than its main rival, the Ford Transit, which was imported from Turkey and later Spain assembly plants, as they were subject to the 25% Chicken Tax.
