= History of electric vehicle industry in China =

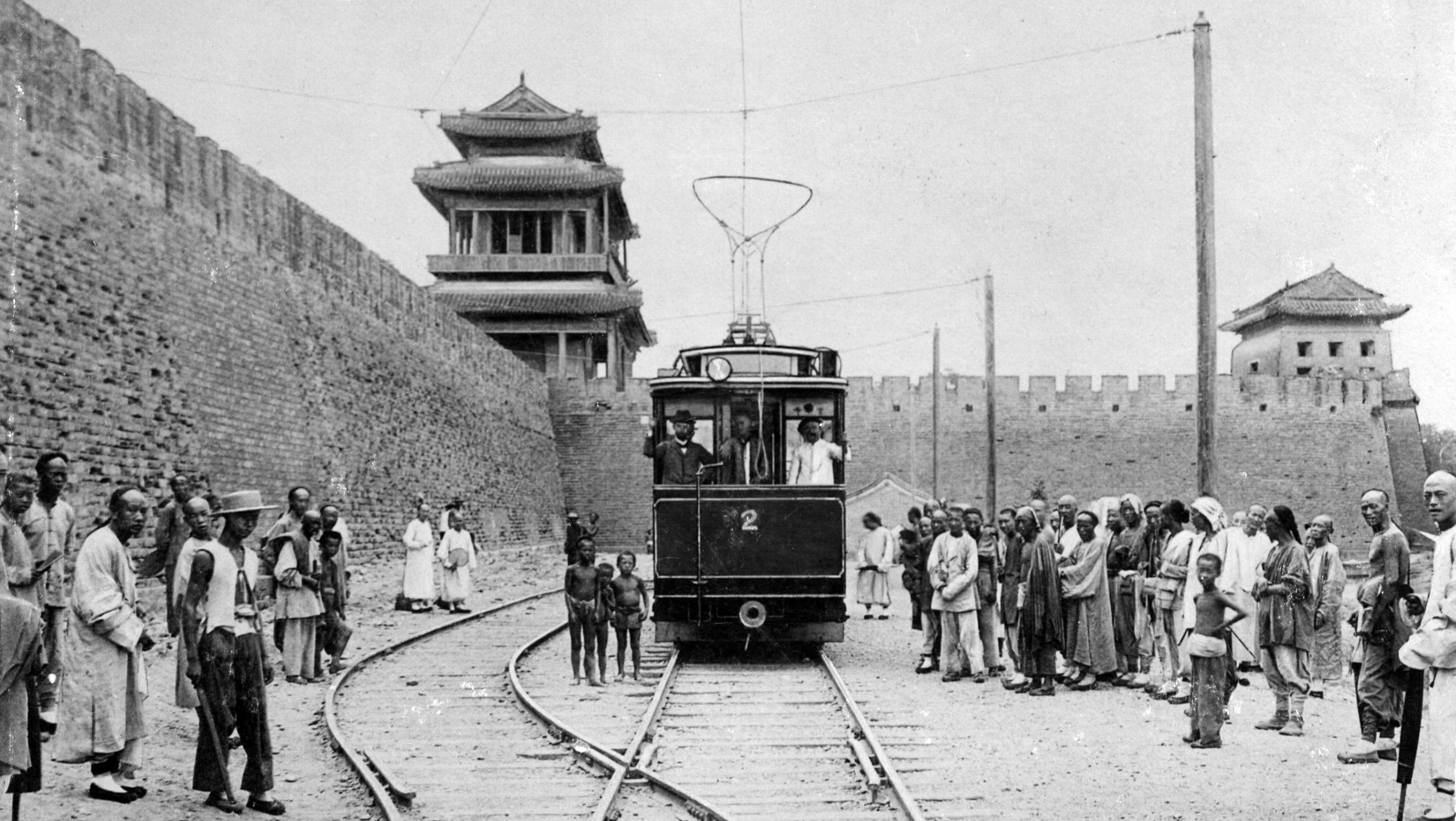
An early electric tramway car in China

Just as electric transportation was an early form of transportation in many parts of the world, China also would have transportation that would be powered electrically, such as electric trams. China would later invest in subways throughout the country and China's first subway was constructed in Beijing in January 1970, nearly one hundred years after its initial development in London.

By 1984, 66 major subway systems existed worldwide. Urban rail transit helped ease the immense pressure caused by urban traffic congestion, while allowing commuters to travel at great speed and convenience. Tianjin was the second city to have an urban rapid transit system and Shanghai was the third, the latter opening its Metro in 1995 that incorporated both subway and light railway lines.

== Electric bike and motorcycle development in the 1990s ==
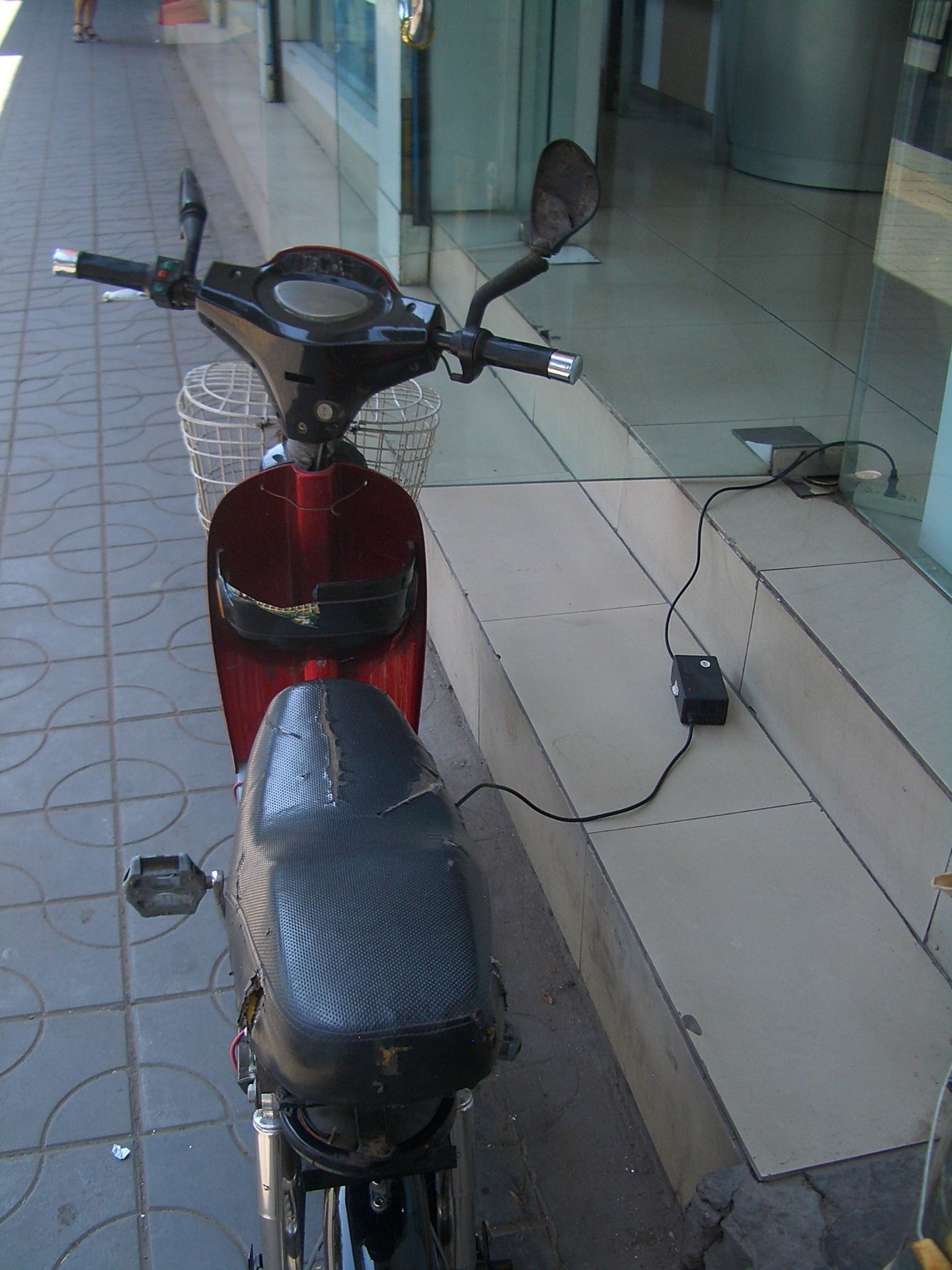
An electric scooter being charged, both electric scooters and electric bicycles are popular forms of transportation in the country.

The two principal types of two-wheeled vehicles in China: two-wheel bicycles propelled by human pedaling supplemented by electrical power from a storage battery (bicycle-style), and low-speed e-scooters propelled almost solely by electricity (scooter-style). The technology of both types is similar. China's two-wheeled electric vehicle industry started under the planned economy of the Maoist 1960s. However, early efforts to develop and commercialize these electric vehicles failed. A group of entrepreneurs gathered during the 1980s to revive the fledgling industry but their ambitions were thwarted by poor technology and limited government support.

By the 1990s, China witnessed the world's most spectacular growth in two-wheeled electric vehicles and annual sales of bicycles and scooters grew from fifty six thousand in 1998 to over twenty one million in 2008. In 2008 only, Chinese bought 21 million electric-bikes, compared with 9.4 million autos.

This growth of electric-bicycles in China was less technology-driven and more policy-driven, facilitated by favorable local regulatory practices in the form of gasoline powered motorcycle bans and loose enforcement of electric bicycle standards. The alleged justifications for these bans included relieving traffic congestion, improving safety and reducing air pollution. Many Chinese cities started to ban or restrict motorcycles and scooters using a variety of measures: some cities suspended the issuance of new motorcycle licenses, others banned the entrance of motorcycles and scooters into certain downtown regions or major roads, and some capped the number of licenses and then auctioned the license plates that were available. These bans were imposed on all motorcycles, regardless of their power sources, and since electric-bikes are categorized as non-motor vehicles they were exempt from the bans. According to the motorcycle committee of the Society of Automotive Engineers of China, the use of motorcycles is now banned or restricted in over ninety major Chinese cities.

In fact, the government further supported the use of electric-bicycles by including them as one of 10 key scientific-development priority projects in the country's ninth Five-Year Plan. Some insiders claim that their development had the personal endorsement of former Premier Li Peng. In addition, improved technology, low barriers to entry, decreasing purchase price, and urban living were factors that furthered the popularity of electric-bicycles as a transportation mode. First, bicycle technology - specifically for motors and batteries - improved significantly during the late 1990s and this, coupled with a vast supplier base and weak intellectual property protection, increased competition. An increase in competition drove down the price of electric-bicycles and at the same time, a rise in gasoline prices made them more competitive economically with alternatives like gasoline-powered scooters or cars. An increased influx of workers to urban areas further increased demand for an affordable, motorized, and convenient form of private mobility since traveling by bicycle or bus in congested areas or across long distances was no longer viable.

Recently, restrictions on electric-bicycles in China have been gradually spreading and there is a growing concern amongst consumers that the government may impose an outright ban. Nevertheless, since they are an important mode of electric transportation, the experience found with electric-bicycles offers important lessons for the launch of other types of electric vehicles.

== Electric car development after 2000 ==
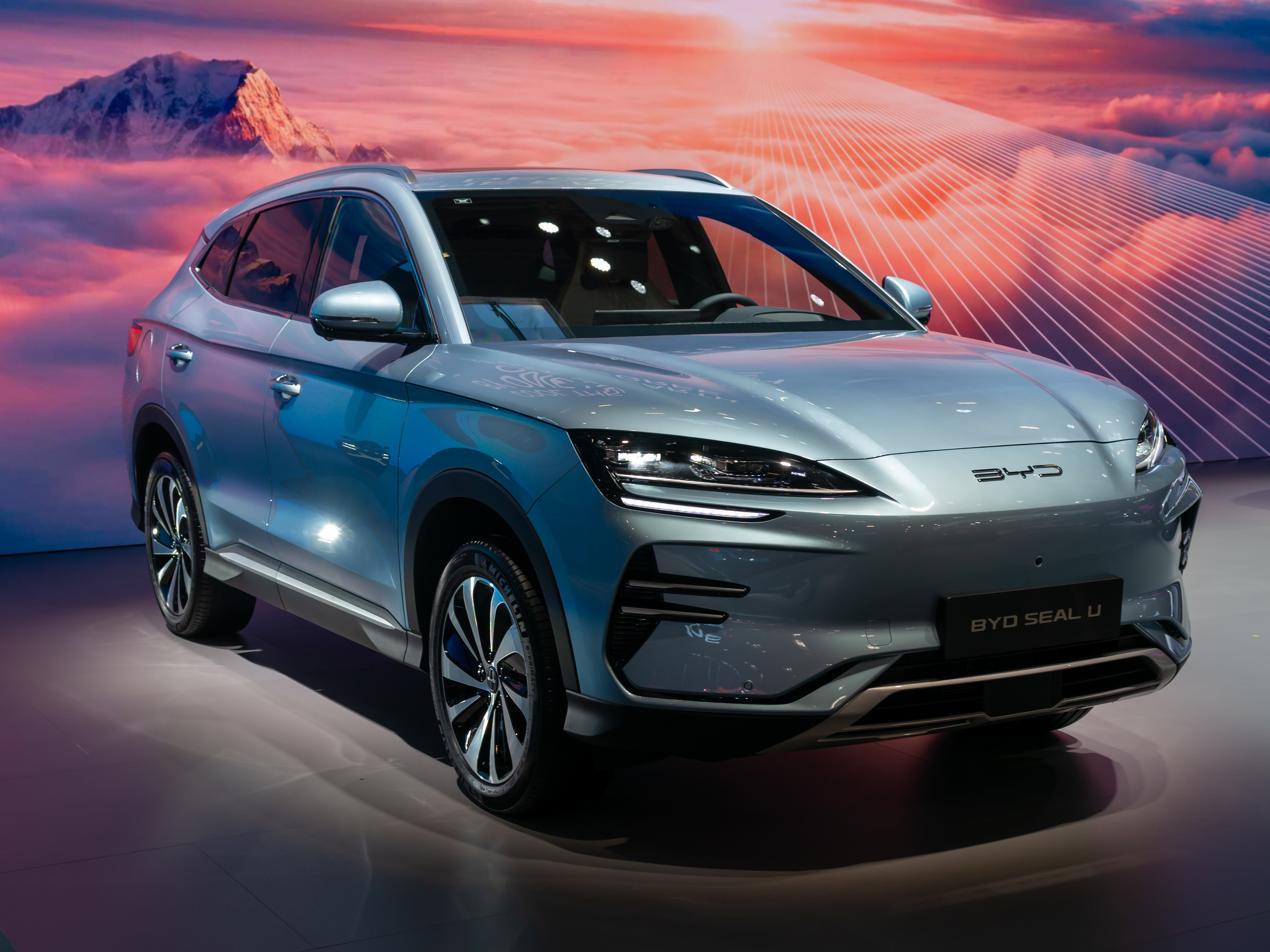
The progress that the country had made with electric vehicles led to one electric vehicle manufacturer, Build Your Dreams (BYD), to become the world's largest manufacturer of electric vehicles, with exports of vehicles to several countries.

According to the China Association of Automobile Manufacturers, China surpassed the United States to become the world's largest automobile market in 2009 with a record 13.9 million vehicles sold in the country, compared to 10.43 million cars and light trucks sold in the United States. There is a quickly growing demand for transport in China as more people can afford to buy cars. To support its commitment to encourage electric-vehicle development the government planned to provide US$15 billion to the industry. Their intention, in addition to creating a world-leading industry that will produce jobs and exports, was to reduce urban pollution and decrease its dependence on oil. As such, government's goal was to have five million battery-electric and plug-in hybrid electric cars on the road by 2020, while also producing one million such vehicles annually by 2020.

The government established a policy framework to accelerate electric-vehicle technology development, while encouraging market transformation that will support research and development, regulate the industry and encourage consumption.

=== Early developments ===
In 2001 China started the "863 EV Project" (pure EV, hybrid EV, and fuel cell vehicles are included). The National Development and Reform Commission published the Auto Industry Development Policy in 2004. That year, sixteen Chinese state-owned companies formed an electric vehicle industry association in Beijing called CEVA. The goal of the association was to integrate technological standards and create a mechanism through which stakeholders share information in order to develop a top of the market e-vehicle. The companies were anticipated to invest a total of US$14.7 billion on the growing electric vehicles market by 2012.

In 2007 China invested over RMB2 billion (US$300 million) in new energy vehicle development.

2008

• Sales volume of Chinese new energy vehicles surges to 366 units in the first half of 2008, reaching a year-on-year increase of 107.9%. Chinese automakers provide around 500 independently developed new energy and fuel efficiency vehicles to serve Beijing Olympics. • 13 cities (Beijing, Shanghai, Chongqing, Changchun, Dalian, Hangzhou, Jinan, Wuhan, Shenzhen, Hefei, Changsha, Kunming, and Nanchang) are chosen as pilot cities for new EV usage in 2009.

2009

• The State Council approves the Auto Industry Restructuring and Revitalization Plan to invest RMB10 billion (US$1.50 billion) for new e-vehicle industrialization. • The State Council invests RMB20 billion (US$3 billion) in technique development. • To improve air quality and reduce reliance on fossil fuels, the government announces a two-year pilot program of subsidizing buyers of alternative energy cars in five cities (Shanghai, Changchun, Shenzhen, Hangzhou and Hefei). The subsidy for EV customers is RMB60,000 for battery electric vehicles (BEV) and RMB50,000 for plug-in hybrid vehicles (PHEV).

2010

• An auto industry (including new energy) development plan for 2011 to 2020 was drafted to include a plan to transform the domestic auto industry. Approval has been delayed. • China plans to expand a project of encouraging the use of energy-efficient and alternative-energy vehicles in public transport to 20 cities from 13. EV).

2011

• There are several major electric vehicle R&D and manufacturer company in Chinese market. The company including: Aiways, SAIC, FAW, Dongfeng, Chana, BAIC, GAC, Chery, BYD and Geely. Additionally, there are several R&D institutes has been built up such as Tsinghua University, Beijing Institute of Technology, and Tongji University. They all have their own centers focusing NEV research.

2015

- In China, sales of plug-in electric vehicles (including live electric vehicles and plug-in hybrid vehicles) soared by 343%. In the field of electric vehicles, this is a huge success.

2018

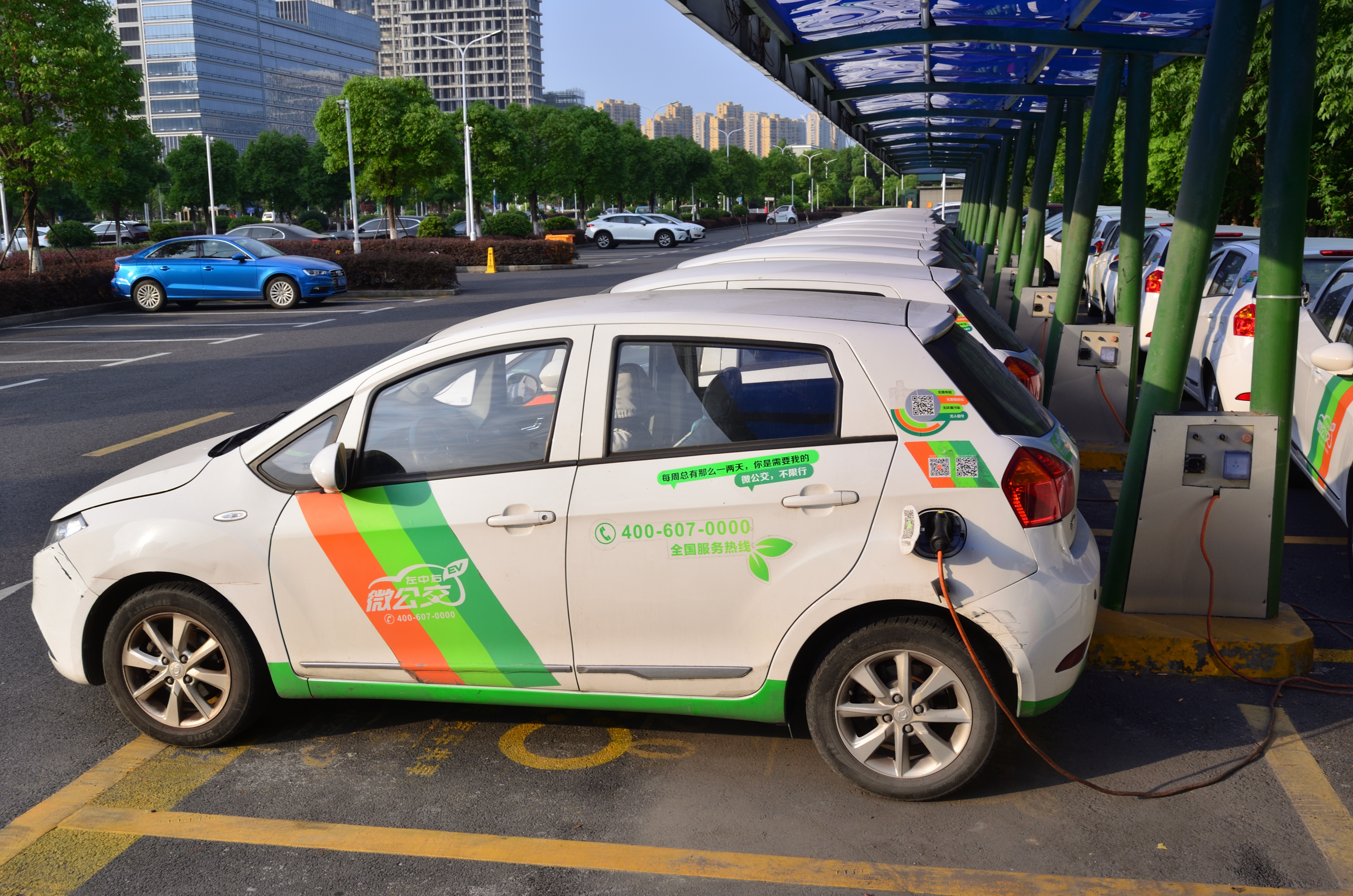
Electric cars charging at a car sharing depot. Shared mobility is encouraged by the government.

- China manufactured and sold about 1.2 million plug-in electric vehicles in 2018, which was more than three times the sales in the US. China has become the fastest and largest growing market for electric vehicles in the world. New electric cars (EV) had a market share of 4.2% of new cars sold in China for the entire year of 2018. Big cities like Shenzhen and Beijing are rapidly adopting electric vehicles—for example, all of Shenzhen's 16,000 public buses are now electric, and soon all of its 22,000 taxis will be electric cars as well.

2024

- In February 2024, China approved a joint venture between subsidiaries of BMW and Mercedes-Benz. They would work on building a rapid charging network in the country.
