= Robert Z. Lawrence =

South Africa-born American economist

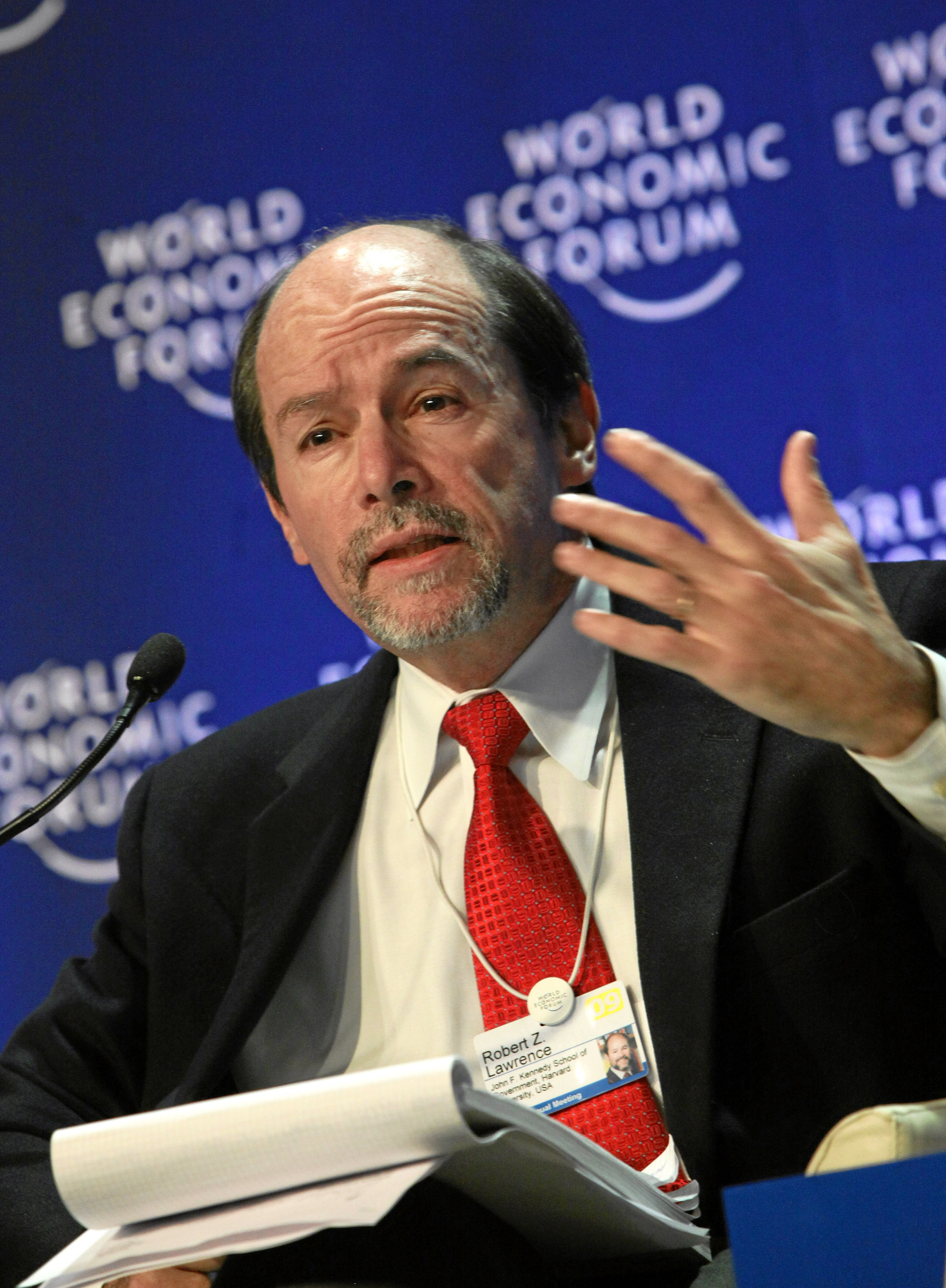
- Lawrence at the World Economic Forum annual meeting in Davos, 2009

Member of the Council of Economic Advisers
- In office March 1999 - January 2001
- Appointed by: Bill Clinton

Personal details
- Born: 1949 (age 76–77) South Africa
- Education: Yale University

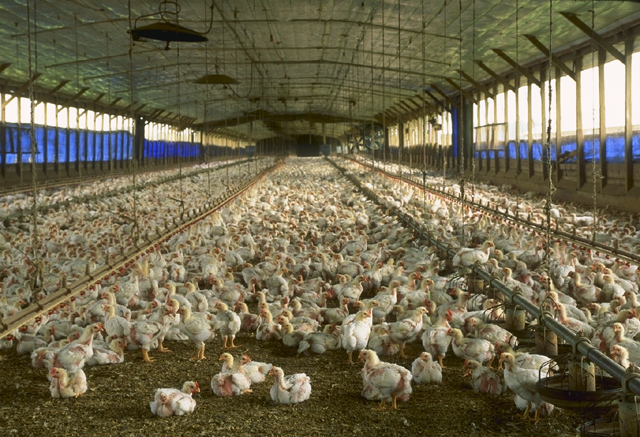
Lawrence postulated that the 1964 Chicken Tax crippled the U.S. automobile industry, by insulating it from real competition in light trucks for 40 years.

Robert Zachary Lawrence (born 1949) is a South Africa-born American economist and Albert L. Williams Professor of International Trade and Investment at John F. Kennedy School of Government at Harvard University. He is also a senior fellow at the Peterson Institute for International Economics, and a research associate at the National Bureau of Economic Research.

Lawrence was appointed to President Bill Clinton’s Council of Economic Advisers from March 1999 to January 2001. Since then, Lawrence has held the New Century Chair as a non-resident senior fellow at the Brookings Institution and founded and edited the Brookings Trade Forum. He is also the director of the Harvard Kennedy School Trade Group and the faculty chair of Kennedy School Executive Programs.

He immigrated to the United States in 1971 and studied at Yale University where he received his Ph.D. in economics in 1978. He has written over 100 papers and articles on topics in the field of international economics. His recent research has focused on global integration and the impact of trade on the labor market.

== Other notable assignments ==
- Senior fellow in the Economic Studies Program at the Brookings Institution (1983–91)
- Research associate at Brookings (1976–82), an instructor at Yale University (1975)
- Professorial lecturer at the Johns Hopkins School of Advanced International Studies (1978–81)
- Consultant to the Federal Reserve Bank of New York
- Consultant to the World Bank
- Consultant to the OECD
- Consultant to the UNCTAD
- Member of the Presidential Commission on United States Pacific Trade and Investment Policy
- Member of the advisory committees of the Institute for International Economics
- Member of the Panel on Foreign Trade Statistics of the National Academy of Sciences
- Member of the Committee for Economic Development
- Member of the Overseas Development Council
- Member of the Panel of Economic Advisors of the Congressional Budget Office
- Chair for the Project on Middle East Trade at the Institute for Social and Economic Policy in the Middle East, John F. Kennedy School of Government

== Selected publication and citations ==
=== Books ===
- Lawrence, Robert Z. Regionalism, Multilateralism, and Deeper Integration. The Brookings Institution, 1996.
- Lawrence, Robert Z., and Ahmed Galal. Anchoring Reform with a US-Egypt Free Trade Agreement. Institute for International Economics, May 2005.
- Bradford, Scott, and Robert Z. Lawrence. Has Globalization Gone Far Enough? The Costs of Fragmentation in OECD Markets. Institute for International Economics, 2004.
- Robert Z. Lawrence. Crimes and Punishments? Retaliation under the WTO. Institute for International Economics, 2003.

=== Book chapters ===
- Lawrence, Robert Z., and Juan Lara. "Puerto Rico: Trade Performance and Industrial Policy." The Economy of Puerto Rico: Restoring Growth. Ed. Susan M. Collins, Barry Bosworth, and Miguel A. Soto-Class. Brookings Institution Press and the Center for the New Economy, 2006.
- Lawrence, Robert Z. "Inequality in America: The Recent Evidence." Cross-Border Human Resources, Labor and Employment Issues: Proceedings of the New York University 54th Annual Conference on Labor Law. Ed. Andrew P. Morriss, Samuel Estreicher. Kluwer Law International, June 2005, 581–88
- Lawrence, Robert Z. (2002). "Competitiveness". In David R. Henderson (ed.). Concise Encyclopedia of Economics (1st ed.). Library of Economics and Liberty. Archived from the original on 2021-04-24. OCLC 317650570, 50016270, 163149563

=== Research papers/reports ===
- Lawrence, Richard Z. "Recent US Free Trade Initiatives in the Middle East: Opportunities but no Guarantees." KSG Faculty Research Working Paper Series RWP06-050, December 2006.
- Lawrence, Robert Z. "China and the Multilateral Trading System." KSG Faculty Research Working Paper Series RWP06-045, October 2006.
- Lawrence, Robert Z., and Tatiana Rosito. "A New Compensation Mechanism for Preference Erosion in the Doha Round." KSG Faculty Research Working Paper Series RWP06-044, October 2006.
- Lawrence, Robert Z., and Tatiana Rosito. "A New Compensation Mechanism for Preference Erosion in the Doha Round." Center for International Development Blue Sky Conference paper, September 2006.

=== Reviews ===
- Lawrence, Robert Z. Comment on "Designing Policies to Capture Beneficial Effects" in Does Foreign Direct Investment Promote Development?, Ed. Theodore H. Moran, Edward M. Graham, Magnus Blomström. 2005: 367–71.
