= Tariff engineering =

Design decisions made to avoid tariffs

Tariff engineering refers to design, sourcing, and manufacturing decisions made primarily so that the manufactured good is classified at a lower rate for tariffs than it would have been absent those decisions. Tariff avoidance is a loophole whereby an importer pays a lower tariff by changing the intended import such that the importer has a lesser tariff burden.

In contrast to illegal tariff evasion, legal tariff engineering configures the design, material, or construction to legally achieve the desired classification rather than illegally misclassifying the product or good. For tariff engineering to be legal, the good being imported must be a "commercial reality", which means any tariff engineering must be a "genuine step in the manufacturing process" or have a commercial use or identity as imported. The rule of commercial reality limits manufacturers in the ways that they attempt to use tariff engineering, by requiring that the features used for tariff engineering purposes must not be removed shortly after importing but must be sold with those features or be used as part of a legitimate manufacturing process.

== In US law ==
Tariff engineering was validated following the 1881 United States Supreme Court case of Merritt v. Welsh, which dealt with the classification of imported sugar. In this case, the importer added molasses to highly refined sugar which darkened the sugar's color. At that time, the tariff classification for sugar was based on the Dutch standard color, which generally corresponded to actual sugar quality. The Port of New York performed a chemical analysis and determined if molasses had been intentionally added to the sugar for the purpose of reclassification on the tariff schedule. After having found that molasses had been added, the Port of New York applied the higher rate of tariff.

The United States Supreme Court found that even though the molasses was added, Congress had clearly stated that the test to be used was the Dutch standard test, and not any other chemical analysis. Thus, the Port of New York was obligated to classify the sugar based solely on the Dutch standard color and must only charge the lower rate of tariff. In explaining his position, Justice Matthews wrote for the majority, "Great stress is laid on the charge that sugars are manufactured in dark colors on purpose to evade our duties. Suppose this is true; has not a manufacturer a right to make his goods as he pleases? If they are less marketable, it is his loss; if they are not less marketable, who has a right to complain? If the duties are affected, there is a plain remedy. Congress can always adopt such laws and regulations as it may deem expedient for protecting the interests of the government."

== Examples ==
Columbia Sportswear uses so called “nurse’s pockets”, or small pockets near the waist line, on many of its women's shirts, including the PFG Tamiami, because women's shirts with pockets below the waistline are levied a lower import tariff than shirts without such pockets.

Converse Chuck Taylor All-Stars sneakers have soles partially covered in a thin layer of felt when new, in order to be classified as slippers and thus pay a lower import tax duty than similar shoes. The layer usually rubs off within a month of having been worn.

=== Chicken tax ===
Ford Motor Company imported the Ford Transit Connect from Spain as complete passenger vehicles, including rear seat, rear seat belts, and rear glass windows, in order to avoid a 25% tariff on cargo-duty vehicles, known as the Chicken tax, and instead pay the lower tariff of 2.5%. Once the vehicles arrived in the United States, Ford converted the Transit Connect into its cargo van by removing the rear seats, rear seat belts, and sometimes replacing the rear glass with metal panels. In 2013 the U.S. Customs and Border Protection ruled that the Transit Connect was a cargo-duty vehicle for importing purposes to the United States, despite the addition of the seat, belts, and windows. Ford appealed to the United States Court of International Trade, which ruled in Ford's favor in 2017 but was overturned on appeal by the United States Court of Appeals for the Federal Circuit in 2019. On June 29, 2020, the Supreme Court of the United States denied certiorari thus ending litigation in favor of the United States. On June 1, 2021, Ford announced it would likely be charged $1.3 billion in penalties and interest in addition to $192 million it had already paid. Both Ford and Daimler, manufacturers of the Mercedes Sprinter van, have made plans to manufacture their respective cargo vans inside the United States to avoid paying the Chicken Tax.

The Subaru BRAT was manufactured with rear-facing “jump seats” inside its truck bed in order to avoid paying the Chicken Tax.

== See also ==
- Repatriation tax avoidance
- Base erosion and profit shifting
