= Carl B. Weinberg =

American economist

- Born: The Bronx, New York City, U.S.

Academic background
- Education: Rutgers University; University of Pennsylvania

Carl Weinberg is an American economist. He is the founder, Chief Economist and managing director of High Frequency Economics, an economic research firm located in Valhalla, New York.

Weinberg was born in the Bronx and raised in Teaneck, New Jersey. He earned his bachelor's degree from Rutgers University. He received a doctorate in economics from the University of Pennsylvania, as a student of Nobel laureate Lawrence Klein. At the University of Pennsylvania, Weinberg also worked under prominent economists F. Gerald Adams, Robert Summers, Oliver E. Williamson and Albert Ando.

Weinberg is one of the original participants in Project Link, an econometric modeling group sponsored by the U.N. He is still a contributor to the group, participating in panel discussions at Project Link conferences in New York and Beijing.

Weinberg has also worked on econometric modeling projects at Wharton Econometric Forecasting Associates and at the National Bureau of Economic Research.

Throughout his career, Weinberg has been based in Toronto, London, Paris, New York and Italy, and he has spent extended time as an advisor in Africa and Latin America. As an IBM Fellow, Weinberg spent several years in Italy in the 1970s, developing macroeconomic modeling innovations at the IBM Scientific Center, located in Pisa.

Starting in 1982, while based in Toronto as an economist at the Bank of Montreal, Weinberg served on several bank advisory committees aimed at negotiating multi-year restructuring deals to keep Latin American sovereign borrowers from defaulting on their loans. He worked directly with finance ministers, central bank governors and other officials of several Latin American governments to develop sustainable restructuring programs.

These experiences provided Weinberg with unique insights into the European sovereign-debt crisis. In the spring of 2010, he recommended multi-year restructuring of Greece's sovereign debt obligations, anticipating the eventual outcome two years in advance.

In the late 1980s, Weinberg was based in New York, at Shearson Lehman Brothers, as the firm's Senior International Economist. During his time at Lehman, he served as an advisor for projects in Africa and Latin America, including a long-term project with the government of Cameroon.

At High Frequency Economics, Weinberg serves as Managing Director and Chief Economist. Under his leadership, High Frequency Economics grew from a two-man firm distributing daily macroeconomic research by messenger service to a global company with 350 client institutions in 25 countries.

In addition to his experience in practical economics, Weinberg has maintained connections throughout his career to the academic world. While living in Italy, he lectured in economics at the European University Institute in Florence. In France, he taught at the American College in Paris. He has also taught economics courses at the Wharton School. Weinberg is currently a professor in the graduate program in economics at New York University. He teaches a popular course in international finance. In the spring of 2012, he initiated the Eurocrisis Discussion Group in NYU's department of economics, a group of economists that meets regularly to analyze developments in the European sovereign-debt crisis. Under Weinberg's leadership, the group prepared an article for Barron's "Other Voices" column titled, "How Europe is 'Unfixing' Its Problems."
