= Bound tariff rate =

Most-favored-nation reference rate

A bound tariff rate is the most-favored-nation tariff rate resulting from negotiations under the General Agreement on Tariffs and Trade (GATT) and incorporated as an integral component of a country’s schedule of concessions or commitments to other World Trade Organization members. If a country raises a tariff to a higher level than its bound rate, those adversely affected can seek remedy through the dispute settlement process and may obtain the right to retaliate against an equivalent value of the offending country’s exports or the right to receive compensation.

Compensation usually takes the form of reduced tariffs on other products which the complainant country exports to the offending country.
