= Tariff =

Goods import or export tax

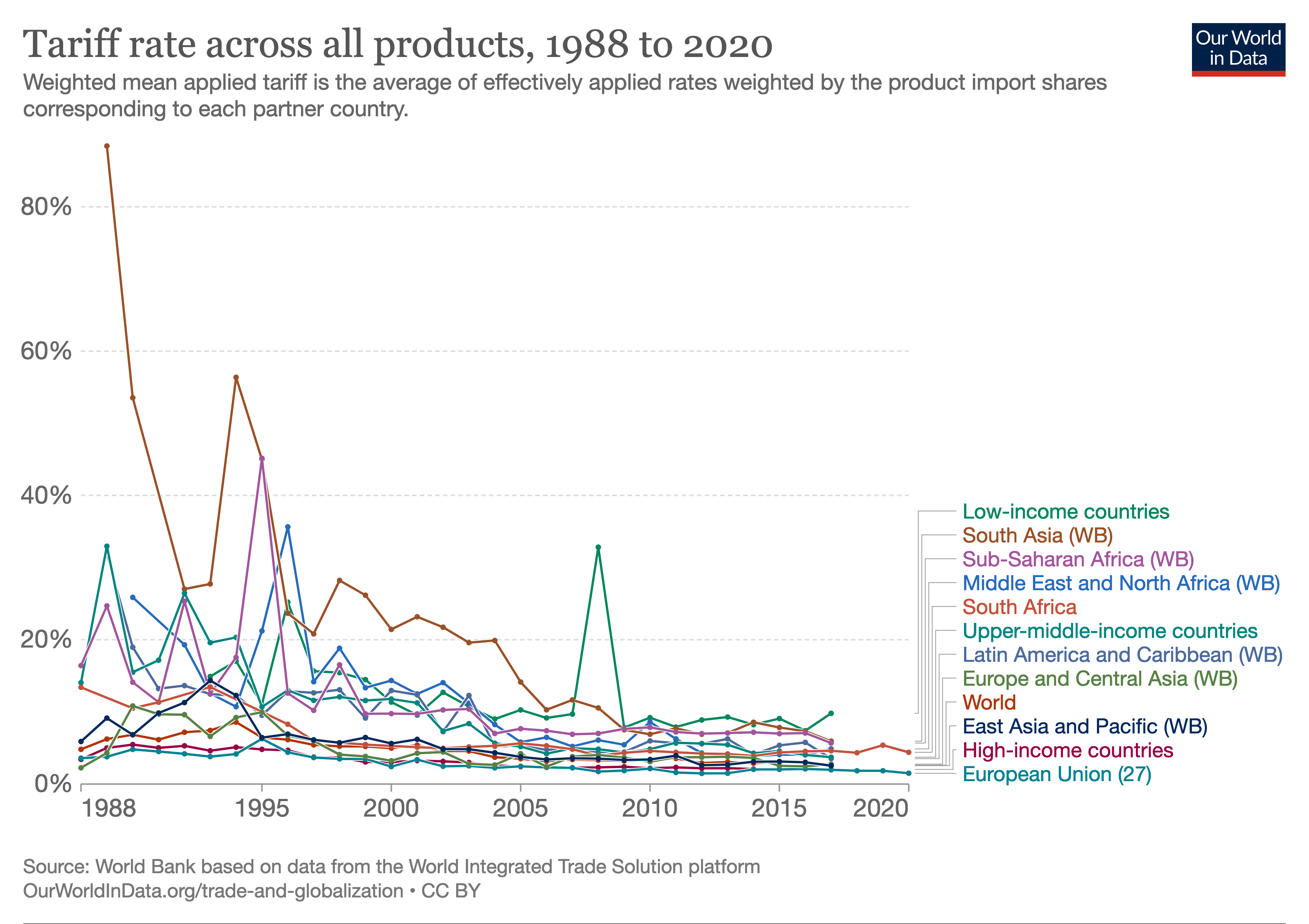
Import tariff rate across all products, all regions, 1988 to 2020

A tariff, or import tax, is a duty imposed by a national government, customs territory, or supranational union on imports of goods and is paid by the importer. Exceptionally, an export tax may be levied on exports of goods or raw materials and is paid by the exporter. Besides being a source of revenue, import duties can also be a form of regulation of foreign trade and policy that burden foreign products to encourage or safeguard domestic industry. Protective tariffs are among the most widely used instruments of protectionism, along with import quotas and export quotas and other non-tariff barriers to trade.

Tariffs can be fixed (a constant sum per unit of imported goods or a percentage of the price) or variable (the amount varies according to the price). Tariffs on imports are designed to raise the price of imported goods to discourage consumption. The intention is for citizens to buy local products instead, which, according to supporters, would stimulate their country's economy. Tariffs therefore provide an incentive to develop production and replace imports with domestic products. Tariffs are meant to reduce pressure from foreign competition and, according to supporters, would help reduce the trade deficit. They have historically been justified as a means to protect infant industries and to allow import substitution industrialisation (industrializing a nation by replacing imported goods with domestic production). Tariffs may also be used to rectify artificially low prices for certain imported goods, due to dumping, export subsidies or currency manipulation. The effect is to raise the price of the goods in the destination country.

There is near unanimous consensus among economists that tariffs are self-defeating and have a negative effect on economic growth and economic welfare, while free trade and the reduction of trade barriers has a positive effect on economic growth. American economist Milton Friedman said of tariffs: "We call a tariff a protective measure. It does protect . . . It protects the consumer against low prices." Although trade liberalisation can sometimes result in unequally distributed losses and gains, and can, in the short run, cause economic dislocation of workers in import-competing sectors, the advantages of free trade are lowering costs of goods for both producers and consumers. The economic burden of tariffs falls on the importer, the exporter, and the consumer. Often intended to protect specific industries, tariffs can end up backfiring and harming the industries they were intended to protect through rising input costs and retaliatory tariffs. Import tariffs can also harm domestic exporters by disrupting their supply chains and raising their input costs.

== Etymology ==
The word tariff ultimately derives from the Arabic taʿrīf, meaning "proclamation" or "information" (from ʿarafa, "to make known"). The Arabic word entered the languages of Europe in the sense "list of prices or duties" in the 16th century, via trade with the Levant. It appears earliest in Italian.

== History ==
=== Ancient Greece ===
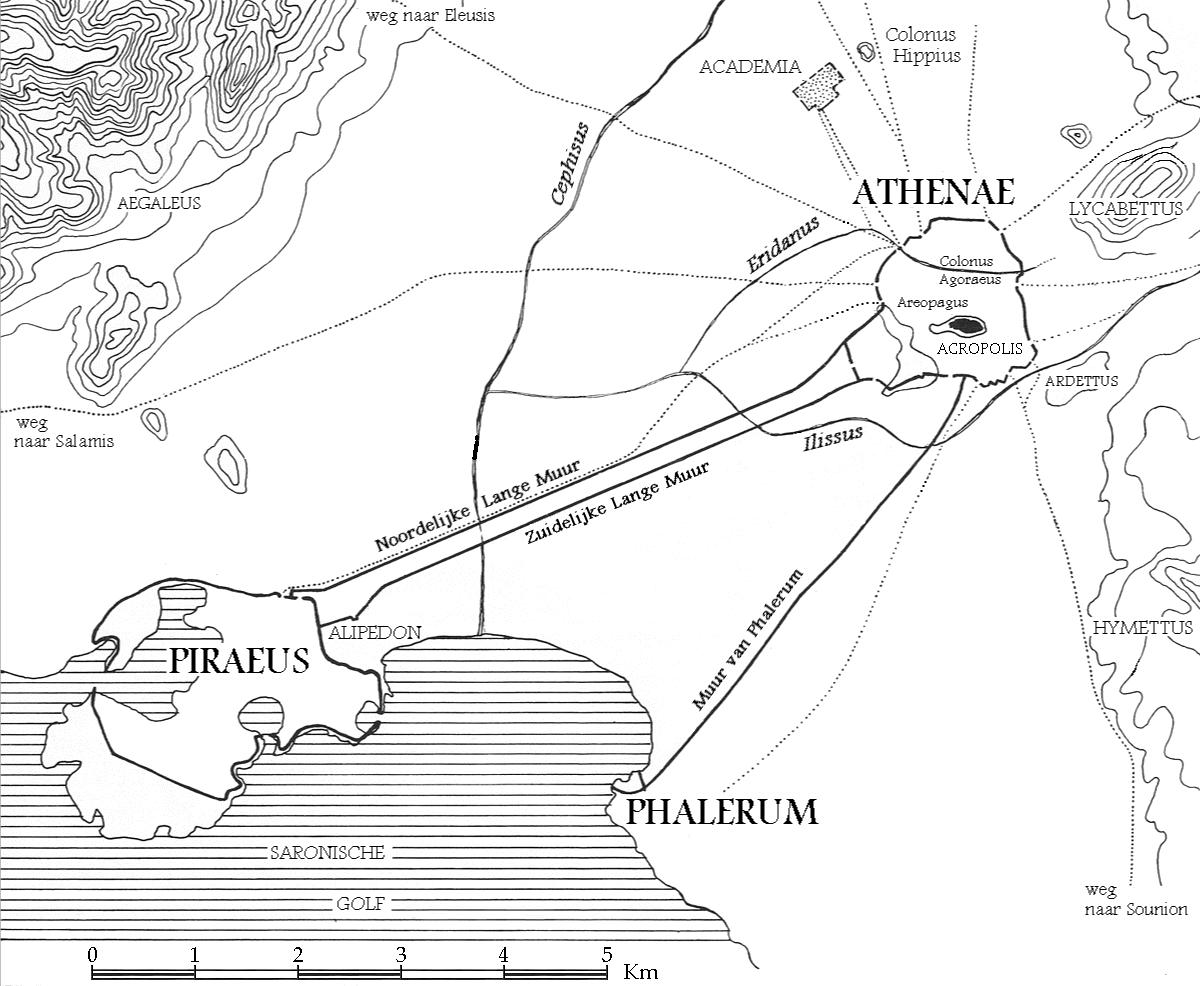
In Ancient Greece, the port of Piraeus was connected to Athens with Long Walls that provided security for transportation of goods.

In the city state of Athens, the port of Piraeus enforced a system of levies to raise taxes for the Athenian government. Grain was a key commodity that was imported through the port, and Piraeus was one of the main ports in the east Mediterranean. A levy of two percent was placed on goods arriving in the market through the docks of Piraeus. The Athenian government also placed restrictions on the lending of money and transport of grain to only be allowed through the port of Piraeus.

=== Britain ===
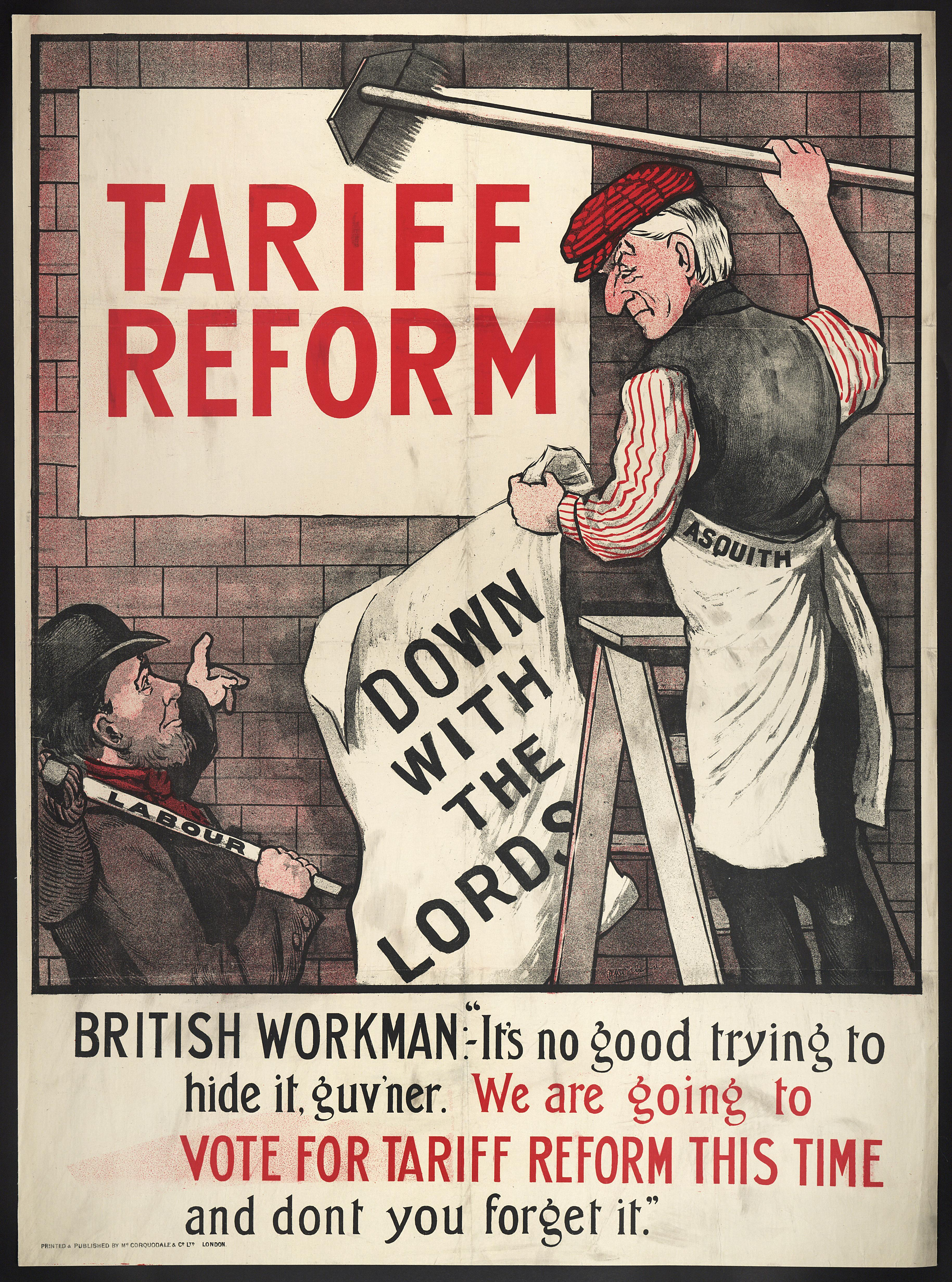
An early 1900s poster draws attention to a political debate over tariff policy.

In the 14th century, Edward III took interventionist measures, such as banning the import of woollen cloth in an attempt to develop local manufacturing. Beginning in 1489, Henry VII took actions such as increasing export duties on raw wool. The Tudor monarchs, especially Henry VIII and Elizabeth I, used protectionism, subsidies, distribution of monopoly rights, government-sponsored industrial espionage and other means of government intervention to protect the wool industry.

A protectionist turning point in British economic policy came in 1721, when policies to promote manufacturing industries were introduced by Robert Walpole. These included, for example, increased tariffs on imported foreign manufactured goods, export subsidies, reduced tariffs on imported raw materials used for manufactured goods and the abolition of export duties on most manufactured goods. Britain was thus among the first countries to pursue a strategy of large-scale infant-industry development. Outlining his policy, Walpole declared that "it is very obvious, that nothing would more contribute to the obtaining so publick [sic] a Good, than to make the Exportation of our own Manufactures, and the Importation of the Commodities used in the manufacturing of them, as easy and unconditional as possible".

British protectionist policies continued over the next century, with Britain remained a highly protectionist country until the mid-19th century. By 1820, the UK's average tariff rate on manufactured imports was 45–55%. In 1815 the Corn Laws were enforced: tariffs and other trade restrictions on imported food and corn. The laws were designed to keep corn prices high to favour domestic farmers, and represented British mercantilism. (Note: According to David Cody (English Faculty, Hartwick College), they "were designed to protect English landholders by encouraging the export and limiting the import of corn when prices fell below a fixed point. They were eventually abolished in the face of militant agitation by the Anti-Corn Law League, formed in Manchester in 1839, which maintained that the laws, which amounted to a subsidy, increased industrial costs. After a lengthy campaign, opponents of the law finally got their way in 1846—a significant triumph which was indicative of the new political power of the English middle class.") The Corn Laws enhanced the profits and political power associated with land ownership. The laws raised food prices and the costs of living for the British public, and hampered the growth of other British economic sectors, such as manufacturing, by reducing the disposable income of the British public.

In 1846 the Corn Laws were repealed, so tariffs were significantly reduced. Economic historians see the repeal of the Corn Laws as a decisive shift towards free trade in Britain. According to a 2021 study, the repeal of the Corn Laws benefitted the bottom 90% of income earners in the United Kingdom economically, while causing income losses for the top 10% of income earners.

In the UK customs duties on many manufactured goods were also abolished. The Navigation Acts were abolished in 1849 when free traders won the public debate in the UK. But while free trade progressed in the UK, protectionism continued on the Continent. The UK unilaterally pursued free trade, even as most other large industrial powers retained protectionist policies. For example, the USA emerged from the Civil War even more explicitly protectionist than before, Germany under Bismarck rejected free trade, and the rest of Europe followed suit. Countries such as the Netherlands, Denmark, Portugal and Switzerland, and arguably Sweden and Belgium, had fully moved towards free trade prior to 1860.

On June 15, 1903, the Secretary of State for Foreign Affairs, Henry Petty-Fitzmaurice, 5th Marquess of Lansdowne, made a speech in the House of Lords in which he defended fiscal retaliation against countries that applied high tariffs and whose governments subsidised products sold in Britain (known as "premium products", later called "dumping"). The retaliation was to take the form of threats to impose duties in response to goods from that country. Liberal unionists had split from the liberals, who advocated free trade, and this speech marked a turning point in the group's slide toward protectionism. Lansdowne argued that the threat of retaliatory tariffs was similar to gaining respect in a room of gunmen by pointing a big gun (his exact words were "a gun a little bigger than everyone else's"). The "Big Revolver" became a slogan of the time, often used in speeches and cartoons.

In response to the Great Depression, Britain temporarily abandoned free trade in 1932. The country reintroduced large-scale tariffs.

=== United States ===
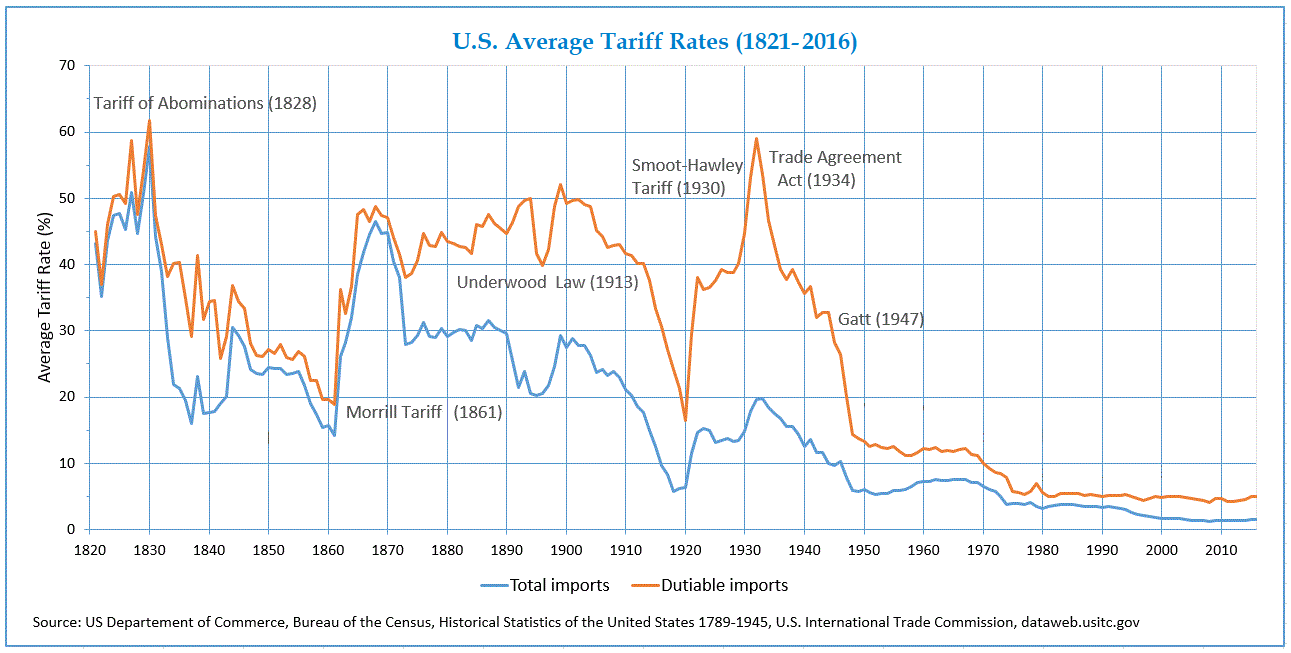
Average tariff rates in US (1821–2016)

According to Douglas Irwin, (Note: Douglas A. Irwin is the John French Professor of Economics in the Economics Department at Dartmouth College and the author of seven books. He is an expert on both past and present U.S. trade policy, especially policy during the Great Depression. He is frequently sought by media outlets such as The Economist and Wall Street Journal to provide comment and his opinion on current events. He also writes op-eds and articles about trade for mainstream media outlets like The Wall Street Journal, The New York Times, and Financial Times. He is also a nonresident senior fellow at the Peterson Institute for International Economics. Prior to his appointment to as professor at Dartmouth, Irwin was an associate professor of business economics at the University of Chicago Booth School of Business, an economist for the Board of Governors of the Federal Reserve System, and an economist for the Council of Economic Advisers Executive Office of the president.) tariffs have historically served three main purposes: generating revenue for the federal government, restricting imports to protect domestic producers, and securing reciprocity through trade agreements that reduce barriers. The history of U.S. trade policy can be divided into three distinct eras, each characterized by the predominance of one goal. From 1790 to 1860, revenue considerations dominated, as import duties accounted for approximately 90% of federal government receipts. From 1861 to 1933, the growing reliance on domestic taxation shifted the focus of tariffs toward protecting domestic industries. From 1934 to 2016, the primary objective of trade policy became the negotiation of trade agreements with other countries. The three eras of U.S. tariff history were separated by two major shocks—the Civil War and the Great Depression—that realigned political power and shifted trade policy objectives.

Political support by members of Congress often reflects the economic interests of producers rather than consumers, as producers tend to be better organized politically and employ many voting workers. Trade-related interests differ across industries, depending on whether they focus on exports or face import competition. In general, workers in export-oriented sectors favor lower tariffs, while those in import-competing industries support higher tariffs.

Because congressional representation is geographically based, regional economic interests tend to shape consistent voting patterns over time. For much of U.S. history, the primary division over trade policy has been along the North–South axis. In the early 19th century, a manufacturing corridor developed in the Northeast, including textile production in New England and iron industries in Pennsylvania and Ohio, which often faced import competition. By contrast, the South specialized in agricultural exports such as cotton and tobacco.

In more recent times, representatives from the Rust Belt—spanning from Upstate New York through the industrial Midwest—have often opposed trade agreements, while those from the South and the West have generally supported them. The regional variation in trade-related interests implies that political parties may adopt opposing positions on trade policy when their electoral bases differ geographically. Each of the three trade policy eras—focused respectively on revenue, restriction, and reciprocity—occurred during periods of political dominance by a single party able to implement its preferred policies.

==== Colonial period ====
Trade policy was a subject of controversy even prior to the independence of the United States. The thirteen North American colonies were subject to the restrictive framework of the Navigation Acts, which directed most colonial trade through Britain. Approximately three-quarters of colonial exports were enumerated goods that had to pass through a British port before being reexported elsewhere, a policy that reduced the prices received by American planters.

Historians have debated whether British mercantilist policies harmed American colonial interests and fueled the American Revolution. Harper estimated that trade restrictions cost the colonies about 2.3% of their income in 1773, though this excluded benefits of empire, such as defense and lower shipping insurance. The economic burden of the Navigation Acts fell mostly on the southern colonies, especially tobacco planters in Maryland and Virginia, potentially reducing regional income by up to 2.5% and strengthening support for independence. American foreign trade declined sharply during the Revolutionary War and remained subdued into the 1780s. Trade revived during the 1790s but remained volatile due to ongoing military conflicts in Europe.

==== Revenue period (1790–1860) ====
Beginning in 1790, the newly established federal government adopted tariffs as its primary source of revenue. There was a consensus among the Founding Fathers that tariffs were the most efficient way of raising public funds as well as the most politically acceptable. Early sales taxes in the post-colonial period were highly controversial, difficult to enforce, and costly to administer. This was evident during events like the Whiskey Rebellion, where the enforcement of sales taxes led to significant resistance. Similarly, an income tax did not make sense for numerous reasons, particularly due to the complexities of tracking and collecting it. In contrast, tariffs were a simpler solution. Imports entered the United States primarily through a limited number of ports, such as Boston, New York City, Philadelphia, Baltimore, and Charleston, South Carolina. This concentration of imports made it easier to impose taxes directly at these points, streamlining the process of collection. Furthermore, tariffs were less visible to the general public because they were built into the price of goods, reducing political resistance. The system allowed for efficient revenue generation without the immediate visibility or perceived burden of other tax forms, contributing to its political acceptability among the Founders.

President Thomas Jefferson initiated a notable policy experiment by enacting a complete embargo on maritime commerce, with Congressional support, beginning in December 1807. The stated objective of the embargo was to protect American vessels and sailors from becoming entangled in the Anglo-French naval conflict (the Napoleonic Wars). By mid-1808, the United States had reached near-autarkic conditions, representing one of the most extreme peacetime interruptions of international trade in its history. The embargo, which remained in effect from December 1807 to March 1809, imposed significant economic costs. Irwin (2005) estimates that the static welfare loss associated with the embargo was approximately 5% of GDP.

From 1837 to 1860, spanning the Second Party System and ending with the Civil War, the Democratic Party held political dominance in the United States. The Democrats drew support primarily from the export-oriented South and promoted the slogan "a tariff for revenue only" to express their opposition to protective tariffs. As a result, the average tariff declined from early 1830s levels to under 20% by 1860. During this period, there were 12 sessions of Congress: 7 under unified government (6 led by Democrats, 1 by Whigs) and 5 under divided control. This meant that over the 34-year span, the pro-tariff Whig Party, based in the North, held power for only two years. They succeeded in raising tariffs in 1842, but this was reversed in 1846 after Democrats returned to power. Throughout the 10 years of divided government, tariff policy remained unchanged.

==== Civil War (1861–1865) ====
Some non-academic commentators have argued that trade restrictions were a major factor in the South's decision to secede during the Civil War, although this view is not widely supported among academic historians. After the 1828 Tariff of Abominations, South Carolina threatened secession, but the crisis was resolved through the Compromise of 1833, which led to a steady decline in tariffs. Further reductions followed in 1846 and 1857, bringing the average tariff below 20% on the eve of the war—one of the lowest levels in the antebellum period. Irwin notes that Southern Democrats had substantial influence over trade policy until the Civil War. He rejects the revisionist claim—often associated with the Lost Cause narrative—that the Morrill Tariff triggered the conflict. Instead, Irwin argues that the Morrill Tariff only passed because Southern states had already seceded and their representatives were no longer in Congress to oppose it. It was signed by President James Buchanan, a Democrat, before Lincoln took office. In short, Irwin finds no evidence that tariffs were a major cause of the Civil War.

==== Restriction period (1866–1928) ====
The Civil War shifted political power from the South to the North, benefiting the Republican Party, which favored protective tariffs. As a result, trade policy focused more on restriction than revenue, and average tariffs increased. From 1861 to 1932, the Republicans dominated American politics and drew their political support from the North, where manufacturing interests were concentrated. Republicans supported high tariffs to limit imports, leading to rates rising to 40–50% during the Civil War and remaining at that level for several decades. During this time, there were 35 sessions of Congress, including 21 under unified government (17 Republican, 4 Democratic) and 14 under divided control. Over the span of 72 years, Democrats succeeded in reducing tariffs only twice, in 1894 and 1913, but both efforts were swiftly reversed when Republicans regained power. Although trade policy was often contested, it remained relatively stable due to prolonged one-party dominance and institutional barriers to change.

According to Irwin, a common myth about U.S. trade policy is that high tariffs made the United States into a great industrial power in the late 19th century. As its share of global manufacturing powered from 23% in 1870 to 36% in 1913, the admittedly high tariffs of the time came with a cost, estimated at around 0.5% of GDP in the mid-1870s. In some industries, they might have sped up development by a few years. U.S. economic growth during its protectionist era was driven more by its abundant natural resources and openness to people and ideas, including large-scale immigration, foreign capital, and imported technologies. While tariffs on manufactured goods were high, the country remained open in other respects, and much of the economic growth occurred in services such as railroads and telecommunications rather than in manufacturing, which had already expanded significantly before the Civil War when tariffs were lower.

==== Great Depression and Smoot–Hawley Tariff (1929–1933) ====
The Tariff Act of 1930, commonly known as the Smoot–Hawley Tariff, is considered one of the most controversial tariff laws ever enacted by the United States Congress. The act raised the average tariff on dutiable imports from approximately 40% to 47%, though price deflation during the Great Depression caused the effective rate to rise to nearly 60% by 1932. The Smoot–Hawley Tariff was implemented as the global economy was entering a severe downturn. The Great Depression of 1929–1933 represented an economic collapse for both the United States—where real GDP declined by about 25% and unemployment exceeded 20%—and much of the world. As international trade contracted, trade barriers multiplied, unemployment increased, and industrial output declined worldwide, leading many to attribute part of the global economic crisis to the Smoot–Hawley Tariff. The extent to which this legislation contributed to the depth of the Great Depression has remained a subject of ongoing debate.

Irwin argues that while the Smoot-Hawley Tariff Act was not the primary cause of the Great Depression, it contributed to its severity by provoking international retaliation and reducing global trade. What mitigated the impact of Smoot-Hawley was the small size of the trade sector at the time. Only a third of total imports to the United States in 1930 were subject to duties, and those dutiable imports represented only 1.4 percent of GDP. According to Irwin, there is no evidence that the legislation achieved its goals of net job creation or economic recovery. Even from a Keynesian perspective, the policy was counterproductive, as the decline in exports exceeded the reduction in imports. While falling foreign incomes were a key factor in the collapse of U.S. exports, the tariff also limited foreign access to U.S. dollars, appreciating the currency and making American goods less competitive abroad. Irwin emphasizes that one of the most damaging consequences of the Act was the deterioration of the United States' trade relations with key partners. Enacted at a time when the League of Nations was seeking to implement a global "tariff truce", the Smoot-Hawley Tariff was widely perceived as a unilateral and hostile move, undermining international cooperation. In his assessment, the most significant long-term impact was that the resentment it generated encouraged other countries to form discriminatory trading blocs. These preferential arrangements, diverted trade away from the United States and hindered the global economic recovery.

In a November 2024 article, The Economist observed that the Act, "which raised average tariffs on imports by around 20% and incited a tit-for-tat trade war, was devastatingly effective: global trade fell by two-thirds. It was so catastrophic global trade fell by two-thirds. It was so catastrophic for growth in America and around the world that legislators have not touched the issue since. 'Smoot-Hawley' became synonymous with disastrous policy making".

Economist Paul Krugman argues that protectionism does not necessarily cause recessions, since a reduction in imports resulting from tariffs can have an expansionary effect that offsets the decline in exports. In his view, trade wars tend to reduce exports and imports symmetrically, with limited net impact on economic growth. He contends that the Smoot–Hawley Tariff Act was not the cause of the Great Depression; instead, he sees the sharp decline in trade between 1929 and 1933 as a consequence of the Depression, with trade barriers representing a policy response rather than a trigger.

Economist Milton Friedman argued that while the tariffs of 1930 caused harm, they were not the main cause for the Great Depression. He placed greater blame on the lack of sufficient action on the part of the Federal Reserve. Peter Temin, an economist at the Massachusetts Institute of Technology, has agreed that the contractionary effect of the tariff was small. Other economists have contended that the record tariffs of the 1920s and early 1930s exacerbated the Great Depression in the U.S., in part because of retaliatory tariffs imposed by other countries on the United States.

==== Reciprocity period (1934–2016) ====
The Great Depression led to a political realignment following the Democratic victory in the 1932 election. This election ended decades of Republican dominance and initiated a period of Democratic control over the federal government that lasted from 1933 to 1993. The realignment shifted influence toward the party that prioritized export-oriented interests in the South. Consequently, the focus of trade policy moved from protectionism to reciprocity, and average tariff levels declined significantly. During this period, there were 30 sessions of Congress, with 16 under unified government (15 Democratic, 1 Republican) and 14 under divided government. Over these 60 years, the overarching goal of promoting reciprocal trade agreements remained largely unchanged, including during the two-year span (1953–1955) when Republicans held unified control.

Following World War II, and in contrast to earlier periods, the Republican Party began supporting trade liberalization. From the early 1950s through the early 1990s, an unusual era of bipartisan consensus emerged, during which both parties generally aligned on trade policy. This occurred during the Cold War, when foreign policy concerns were prominent and partisan divisions were subdued (Bailey 2003).

After the 1993 vote on the North American Free Trade Agreement (NAFTA), Democratic support for trade liberalization declined significantly. By that time, the two major parties had effectively reversed their positions on trade policy. This shift in party alignment primarily reflects changes in regional representation: the South transitioned from being a Democratic stronghold to a Republican one, while the Northeast became increasingly Democratic. As a result, regional views on trade policy remained largely consistent, but the parties came to represent different geographic constituencies.

== Basic economic analysis ==
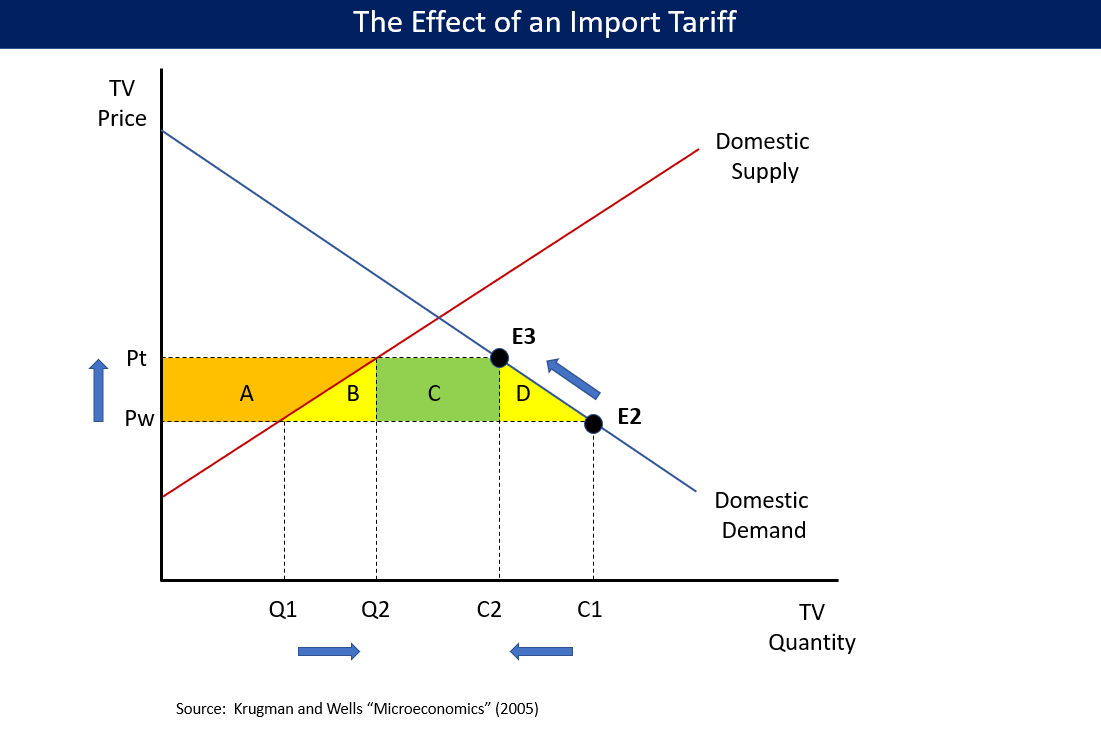
Effects of an import tariff, which hurts domestic consumers more than domestic producers are helped. Higher prices and lower quantities reduce consumer surplus by areas A+B+C+D, while expanding producer surplus by A and government revenue by C. Areas B and D are dead-weight losses, surplus lost by consumers and overall. For a more detailed analysis of this diagram, see Free trade#Economics.

Economic analyses of tariffs generally find that tariffs distort the free market and increase prices of both foreign and domestic products. The welfare effects of tariffs on an importing country are usually negative, even if other countries do not retaliate, as the loss of foreign competition drives up prices for domestic goods by the amount of the tariff. The diagrams at right show the costs and benefits of imposing a tariff on a good in the domestic economy under the standard model of tariffs in a competitive economy. Because of its importance, simplicity, and widespread applicability, this microeconomic model of tariffs is usually taught in introductory (first-year) microeconomics courses.

Imposing an import tariff has the following effects, shown in the first diagram in a hypothetical domestic market for televisions:

- Price rises from world price Pw to higher tariff price Pt.
- Quantity demanded by domestic consumers falls from C1 to C2, a movement along the demand curve due to higher price.
- Domestic suppliers are willing to supply Q2 rather than Q1, a movement along the supply curve due to the higher price, so the quantity imported falls from C1−Q1 to C2−Q2.
- Consumer surplus (the area under the demand curve but above price) shrinks by areas A+B+C+D, as domestic consumers face higher prices and consume lower quantities.
- Producer surplus (the area above the supply curve but below price) increases by area A, as domestic producers shielded from international competition can sell more of their product at a higher price.
- Government tax revenue equals the import quantity (C2 − Q2) multiplied by the tariff price (Pw − Pt), shown as area C.
- Areas B and D are deadweight losses, surplus formerly captured by consumers that is now lost to all parties.

The final state after imposition of the tariff has overall welfare reduced by the areas B and D, as these are received by no one:

$$\begin{align}
\Delta(\text{welfare})
&= \Delta(\text{consumer welfare}) + \Delta(\text{producer welfare}) + \Delta(\text{government welfare})\\
&= (-A-B-C-D) + A + B = -B-D < 0.
\end{align}$$
(The symbol Δ means "change in")

In other words, the losses to domestic consumers are greater than the combined benefits to domestic producers and government.

Region	Description and meaning	Transfer or loss
A	Producer surplus (additional revenue received by producers as a result of the tariff)	Transfer from domestic consumers to domestic producers
B	Cost incurred by the expansion of domestic production beyond the efficient level (using more/costlier resources than importing would have)	Deadweight loss
C	Tax revenue to governments	Transfer from domestic consumers to government
D	Trades prevented by the tariff because price now exceeds willingness to pay	Deadweight loss

Tariffs are generally more inefficient than consumption taxes.

=== Optimal tariff ===
For economic efficiency, free trade is often the best policy, however levying a tariff is sometimes second best.

A tariff is called an optimal tariff if it is set to maximise the welfare of the country imposing the tariff. It is a tariff derived from the intersection between the trade indifference curve of that country and the offer curve of another country. In this case, the welfare of the other country grows worse simultaneously, thus the policy is a kind of beggar thy neighbor policy. If the offer curve of the other country is a line through the origin point, the original country is in the condition of a small country, so any tariff worsens the welfare of the original country.

It is possible to levy a tariff as a political policy choice, and to consider a theoretical optimum tariff rate. However, imposing an optimal tariff will often lead to the foreign country increasing their tariffs as well, leading to a loss of welfare in both countries. When countries impose tariffs on each other, they will reach a position off the contract curve, meaning that both countries' welfare could be increased by reducing tariffs.

== Impact ==
=== Domestic output, productivity and welfare ===
An empirical study by Furceri et al. (2019) found that protectionist policies like raising tariffs significantly reduce domestic output and productivity. A study from 1999 by Frankel and Romer showed that, after accounting for other factors, countries with more trade tend to have higher growth and income. The effect is quantitatively large and statistically significant.

That tariffs overall reduce welfare is not controversial among economists. In a 2018 survey by the University of Chicago, about 40 top economists were asked whether new U.S. tariffs on steel and aluminum would benefit Americans. Two-thirds strongly disagreed, and the rest simply disagreed. None agreed. Several explained that these tariffs would help a small number of Americans but harm many more. This is consistent with the basic economic analysis provided above, which shows that the costs to consumers are larger than the combined gains for domestic producers and the government, resulting in net losses known as deadweight loss.

A 2021 study covering 151 countries from 1963 to 2014 found that raising tariffs leads to long-term drops in output and productivity, along with more unemployment and inequality. It also found that tariffs tend to push up the value of the currency, while trade balances stay largely unchanged.

A 2025 study into the effect of tariffs ranging from 8 to 30 percent on over 170 steel products, imposed in 2002 by George W. Bush, showed that those tariffs created persistent negative employment effects in manufacturing industries that rely on steel as an input—despite being removed after just 18 months.

=== Developing countries ===
Proportion of tariff lines applied to imports from least developed countries with zero-tariff (2017)

Some commentators note a correlation between protectionist (mercantilist) policies and strong economic growth in countries such as China, South Korea, Japan, and Taiwan. However, there is broad consensus among economists that free trade helps workers in developing countries, even if those countries have lower labor and environmental standards. This is because "the growth of manufacturing—and of the myriad other jobs that the new export sector creates—has a ripple effect throughout the economy" that creates competition among producers, lifting wages and living conditions.

Caliendo, Feenstra, Romalis, and Taylor (2015) used a global economic model covering 189 countries and 15 industries to study the impact of lower tariffs from 1990 to 2010. They found that cutting tariffs increased trade, allowed more firms to start up, and raised overall welfare. Some countries, like India and Vietnam, might have gained even more from fully open trade or even import subsidies, meaning their "optimal" tariff could be negative.

The OECD (2005) simulated the effects of tariff reductions in 24 developing countries and showed that a well-designed combination of tariff cuts and tax reform (e.g., replacing lost tariff revenues with consumption taxes) can lead to net welfare gains.

However, some studies point to possible negative effects. For instance, Topalova (2007) shows that tariff reductions in India during the 1990s were associated with slower progress in poverty reduction, particularly in areas lacking social safety nets and little labor mobility. She argues that policy changes that policymakers should implement complementary measures to ensure a fairer distribution of the gains from liberalization. In particular, reforms that enhance labor mobility, such as changes to labor market policies, can help mitigate the negative effects and reduce inequality.

== Arguments used by proponents of tariffs ==
=== Protection of domestic industry ===
One of the most common arguments for imposing tariffs is the protection of domestic industries that are struggling to survive against foreign competition. However, most economists, particularly those adhering to the theory of comparative advantage, argue that such industries should not be maintained through protection. Instead, the resources employed in these industries should be reallocated to sectors where the country has a comparative advantage, thereby increasing overall economic efficiency. According to this view, the gains in national welfare would outweigh the losses experienced by specific groups affected by import competition, resulting in higher real national income overall.

Economists also recognize, however, that the adjustment process—moving labor and capital from less efficient to more efficient sectors—can be slow and socially costly. As a result, while there is broad consensus against increasing tariffs, many economists support a gradual reduction of existing trade barriers rather than abrupt removal. This approach is seen as a way to avoid further misallocation of resources while minimizing disruption to affected workers and communities.

=== Infant industry argument ===
Protectionists argue that emerging industries, especially in less-developed countries, may need temporary protection from established foreign competitors in order to develop and become competitive. Mainstream economists do acknowledge that tariffs can in the short-term help domestic industries to develop but this depends on the short-term nature of the protective tariffs and the ability of the government to pick the winners. In practice, tariffs often remain in place after the industry matures, and governments frequently fail to pick winners. Multiple empirical studies across different countries—such as Turkey in the 1960s and several Latin American nations—document failed attempts at infant industry protection. In many developing countries, industries have failed to attain international competitiveness even after 15 or 20 years of operation and might not survive if protective tariffs were removed. Moreover, economists argue that infant-industry protection can be harmful not only at the national level but also internationally. If multiple countries pursue such protection simultaneously, it can fragment global markets, preventing firms from achieving economies of scale through exports, and leading to inefficient, small-scale production across countries.

=== Unemployment ===
Tariffs are sometimes proposed as a means to protect domestic employment during economic downturns. However, there is near-unanimous agreement among modern economists that this approach is misguided. Tariffs may shift unemployment abroad without increasing overall output and often provoke retaliatory measures. Economists generally agree that unemployment is more effectively addressed through appropriate fiscal and monetary policies.

=== National defense ===
Industries often invoke national security to justify tariff protection, arguing that certain products are essential in times of war when imports may be disrupted. Economists generally consider this a weak argument, noting that tariffs are an inefficient way to ensure the survival of critical industries. Instead, they recommend direct subsidies as a more transparent and effective means of supporting sectors deemed vital for national defense.

=== Autarky ===
Some protectionist arguments are rooted in autarkic sentiment—the desire for national self-sufficiency and independence from global economic risks. However, there is general agreement that no modern nation, regardless of how rich and varied its resources, could really practice self-sufficiency, and attempts in that direction could produce sharp drops in real income.

=== Trade deficits ===
According to some proponents of tariffs, trade deficits are seen as inherently harmful and in need of removal, a view many economists rejected as a flawed understanding of trade. The notion that bilateral trade deficits are per se detrimental to the respective national economies is overwhelmingly rejected by trade experts and economists.

According to proponents tariffs can help reduce trade deficits, but according to economists tariffs do not determine the size of trade deficits and trade balances are driven by consumption. Rather, it is that a strong economy creates rich consumers who in turn create the demand for imports. Industries protected by tariffs expand their domestic market share but an additional effect is that their need to be efficient and cost-effective is reduced. This cost is imposed on (domestic) purchasers of the products of those industries, a cost that is eventually passed on to the end consumer. Finally, other countries must be expected to retaliate by imposing countervailing tariffs, a lose-lose situation that would lead to increased world-wide inflation.

=== Protection against environmental dumping ===
Some argue in favor of tariffs in cases of environmental dumping, where companies benefit from weaker environmental regulations than in other countries, leading to unfair competition. For example, the European Union starts its carbon border-adjustment mechanism in 2026 to level the playing field with firms not subject to European carbon pricing. In 2019, more than 3,500 U.S. economists, including 45 Nobel laureates and former Federal Reserve chairmen, signed the "Economists' Statement on Carbon Dividends." This statement advocates for a border carbon adjustment system that will prevent carbon leakage and enhance the competitiveness of American firms that are more energy-efficient than their foreign competitors.

== Modern tariff practices ==
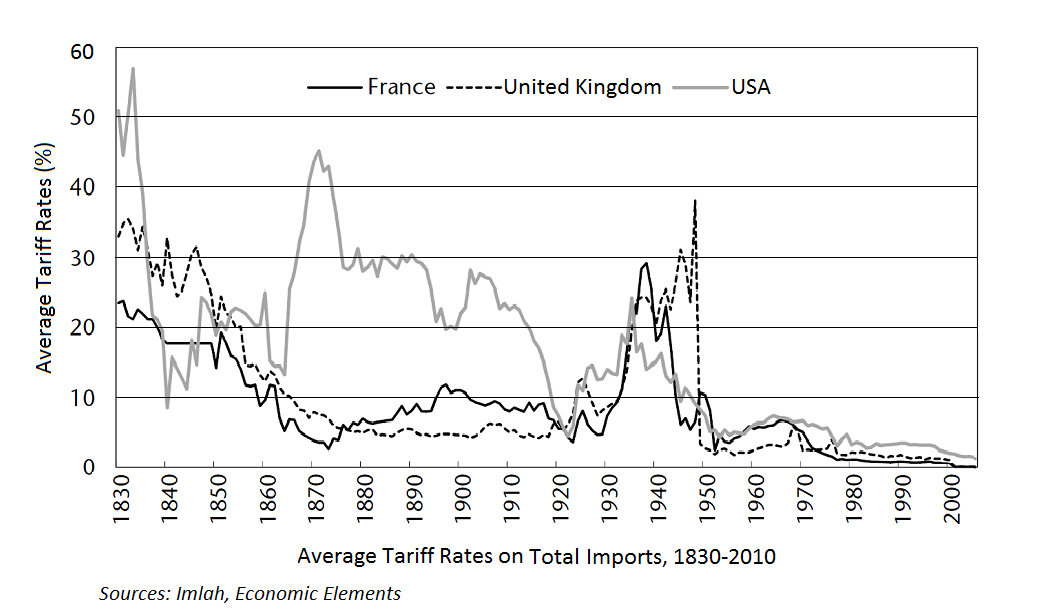
Average tariff rates (France, UK, US)

=== Russia ===
The Russian Federation adopted more protectionist trade measures in 2013 than any other country, making it the world leader in protectionism. It alone introduced 20% of protectionist measures worldwide and one-third of measures in the G20 countries. Russia's protectionist policies include tariff measures, import restrictions, sanitary measures, and direct subsidies to local companies. For example, the government supported several economic sectors such as agriculture, space, automotive, electronics, chemistry, and energy.

=== India ===
From 2017, as part of the promotion of its "Make in India" programme to stimulate and protect domestic manufacturing industry and to combat current account deficits, India has introduced tariffs on several electronic products and "non-essential items". This concerns items imported from countries such as China and South Korea. For example, India's national solar energy programme favours domestic producers by requiring the use of Indian-made solar cells.

=== Armenia ===
Armenia established its customs service in 1992 after the dissolution of the Soviet Union. Since joining the Eurasian Economic Union (EAEU) in 2015, it has benefited from mostly tariff-free trade within the Eurasian Customs Union, while applying more import tariffs on goods from outside. Armenia does not impose export taxes, nor does it declare temporary import duties or credits on government or international assistance imports.

Upon joining Eurasian Economic Union in 2015, led by Russians, Armenia set tariffs at 0–10%, rising over time, especially on agricultural goods. It committed to adopt the EAEU's common tariff schedule, but until 2022, it was allowed to apply non-EAEU rates to certain goods, including meat, dairy, cereals, oils, and some processed foods. EAEU membership requires Armenia to follow stricter EAEU (largely Russian) standards, including sanitary and phytosanitary measures. It has ceded control over much of its trade regime, and rising tariffs offer more protection to domestic industries. Armenian goods must comply with EAEU standards as transition periods expire.

Armenia joined the WTO in 2003, gaining Most Favored Nation (MFN) status. Its average tariff rate of 2.7% is among the lowest in the WTO. It is also a member of the World Customs Organization, using a harmonized tariff classification system.

=== Switzerland ===
In 2024, Switzerland abolished tariffs on industrial products imported into the country. Using 2016 trade figures, the Swiss government estimated the move could have economic benefits of 860 million CHF per year.

=== United States ===
Tariffs during the first presidency of Donald Trump involved protectionist trade initiatives against other countries, most notably against China. In January 2018, Trump imposed tariffs on solar panels and washing machines of 30–50%. In March 2018, he imposed tariffs on steel (25%) and aluminum (10%) from most countries, which, according to Morgan Stanley, covered an estimated 4.1% of U.S. imports. In June 2018, this was extended to the European Union, Canada, and Mexico. The Trump administration separately set and escalated tariffs on goods imported from China, leading to a trade war.

In April 2025, President Donald Trump announced a substantial increase in tariffs and a 10% base tariff on all imported products, resulting in the US trade-weighted average tariff rising from 2% to an estimated 24%, the highest level in over a century, including under the Smoot–Hawley Tariff Act of 1930.

== Political analysis ==
The tariff has been used as a political tool to establish an independent nation; for example, the United States Tariff Act of 1789, signed specifically on July 4, was called the "Second Declaration of Independence" by newspapers because it was intended to be the economic means to achieve the political goal of a sovereign and independent United States.

Tariffs can emerge as a political issue prior to an election. The Nullification Crisis of 1832 arose from the passage of a new tariff by the United States Congress, a few months before that year's federal elections; the state of South Carolina was outraged by the new tariff, and civil war nearly resulted. In the leadup to the 2007 Australian Federal election, the Australian Labor Party announced it would undertake a review of Australian car tariffs if elected. The Liberal Party made a similar commitment, while independent candidate Nick Xenophon announced his intention to introduce tariff-based legislation as "a matter of urgency".

Opinion polls show tariffs can in some cases have majority disapproval. The 1905 meat riots in Chile that developed in protest against tariffs applied to the cattle imports from Argentina.

== Additional information on tariffs ==
=== Calculation of customs duty ===
Customs duty is calculated on the determination of the 'assess-able value' in case of those items for which the duty is levied ad valorem. This is often the transaction value unless a customs officer determines assess-able value in accordance with the Harmonized System.

=== Harmonized System of Nomenclature ===
For the purpose of assessment of customs duty, products are given an identification code that has come to be known as the Harmonized System code. This code was developed by the World Customs Organization based in Brussels. A 'Harmonized System' code may be from four to ten digits. For example, 17.03 is the HS code for "molasses from the extraction or refining of sugar". However, within 17.03, the number 17.03.90 stands for "Molasses (Excluding Cane Molasses)".

To ensure the consistent and fair administration of tariffs globally, the international trading community relies on the HS Code. The system is used by over 200 countries and economies as the foundational basis for their national customs tariffs and for the collection of international trade statistics. At its core, an HS code is a six-digit identifier where the first two digits designate the chapter, the next two the heading, and the final two the subheading, allowing for precise identification of goods.

=== Customs authority ===
The national customs authority in each country is responsible for collecting taxes on the import into or export of goods out of the country.

=== Evasion ===
Evasion of customs duties takes place mainly in two ways. In one, the trader under-declares the value so that the assessable value is lower than actual. In a similar vein, a trader can evade customs duty by understatement of quantity or volume of the product of trade or the location of the import. A trader may also evade duty by misrepresenting traded goods, categorizing goods as items which attract lower customs duties. The evasion of customs duty may take place with or without the collaboration of customs officials.

=== Duty-free goods ===
Many countries allow a traveller to bring goods into the country duty-free. These goods may be bought at ports and airports or sometimes within one country without attracting the usual government taxes and then brought into another country duty-free. Some countries specify 'duty-free allowances' which limit the number or value of duty-free items that one person can bring into the country. These restrictions often apply to tobacco, wine, spirits, cosmetics, gifts and souvenirs.

=== Deferment of tariffs and duties ===
Products may sometimes be imported into a free economic zone (or 'free port'), processed there, then re-exported without being subject to tariffs or duties. According to the 1999 Revised Kyoto Convention, a "'free zone' means a part of the territory of a contracting party where any goods introduced are generally regarded, insofar as import duties and taxes are concerned, as being outside the customs territory".

=== Digital goods and services ===
Digital goods and services generally do not pass through customs, making monitoring and application of tariffs more difficult. Non-tariff barriers to trade of services can be higher than tariffs on goods.

=== Export taxes ===
Export taxes have historically been commonplace in developing countries. In recent decades, export taxes have become a rarity. By 2025, Argentina was one of few countries with export taxes.

== See also ==
- Balance of trade – Difference between the monetary value of exports and imports
- Economic sanctions – Financial penalties applied by nations
- Protectionism – Economic policy of restricting imports
- List of countries by tariff rate
- Smuggling – Illegal movement of goods or people

=== Types ===
- Ad valorem tax – Tax based on value of transaction
- Bound tariff rate – Most-favored-nation reference rate
- Eco-tariff – Tariff to equalise externality costs
- Import quota – Trade barrier
- List of tariffs
- Tariff-rate quota – Combined trade barrier
- Telecommunications tariff – Controlled pricing

=== Trade dynamics ===
- Base erosion and profit shifting – Multinational tax avoidance tools
- Effective rate of protection – Total effect of entire tariff structure
- Re-exportation – Exporting of imported goods without alteration
- Tariffication – Proposal on agricultural import controls
- Tariff engineering – Design decisions made to avoid tariffs

=== Trade liberalisation ===
- General Agreement on Tariffs and Trade – 1947–1995 multilateral trade agreement (GATT)
- General Agreement on Trade in Services – 1995 World Trade Organization treaty (GATS)
- Free-trade area – Regional trade agreement
- Swiss Formula – Method to cut and harmonize tariff rates
- United States International Trade Commission – Government agency
