= Light truck =

Class of truck

Light truck or light-duty truck is a US classification for vehicles with a gross vehicle weight up to 8,500 pounds (3,860 kg) and a payload capacity up to 4,000 pounds (1,814 kg). Similar goods vehicle classes in the European Union, Asia and Africa are termed light commercial vehicles and are limited to a gross vehicle weight of up to 3,500 kg (7,720 pounds). Australia and New Zealand are limited to a gross vehicle weight of up to 4,500 kg (9,920 pounds).

== United States ==
Federal regulations define a light-duty truck to be any motor vehicle having a gross vehicle weight rating (curb weight plus payload) of no more than 8,500 pounds (3,860 kg) which is “(1) Designed primarily for purposes of transportation of property or is a derivation of such a vehicle, or (2) Designed primarily for transportation of persons and has a capacity of more than 12 persons, or (3) Available with special features enabling off-street or off-highway operation and use.” Light trucks includes vans, pickups, and sport utility vehicles. Vehicles in this category are far more likely to kill or injure pedestrians than smaller passenger cars.

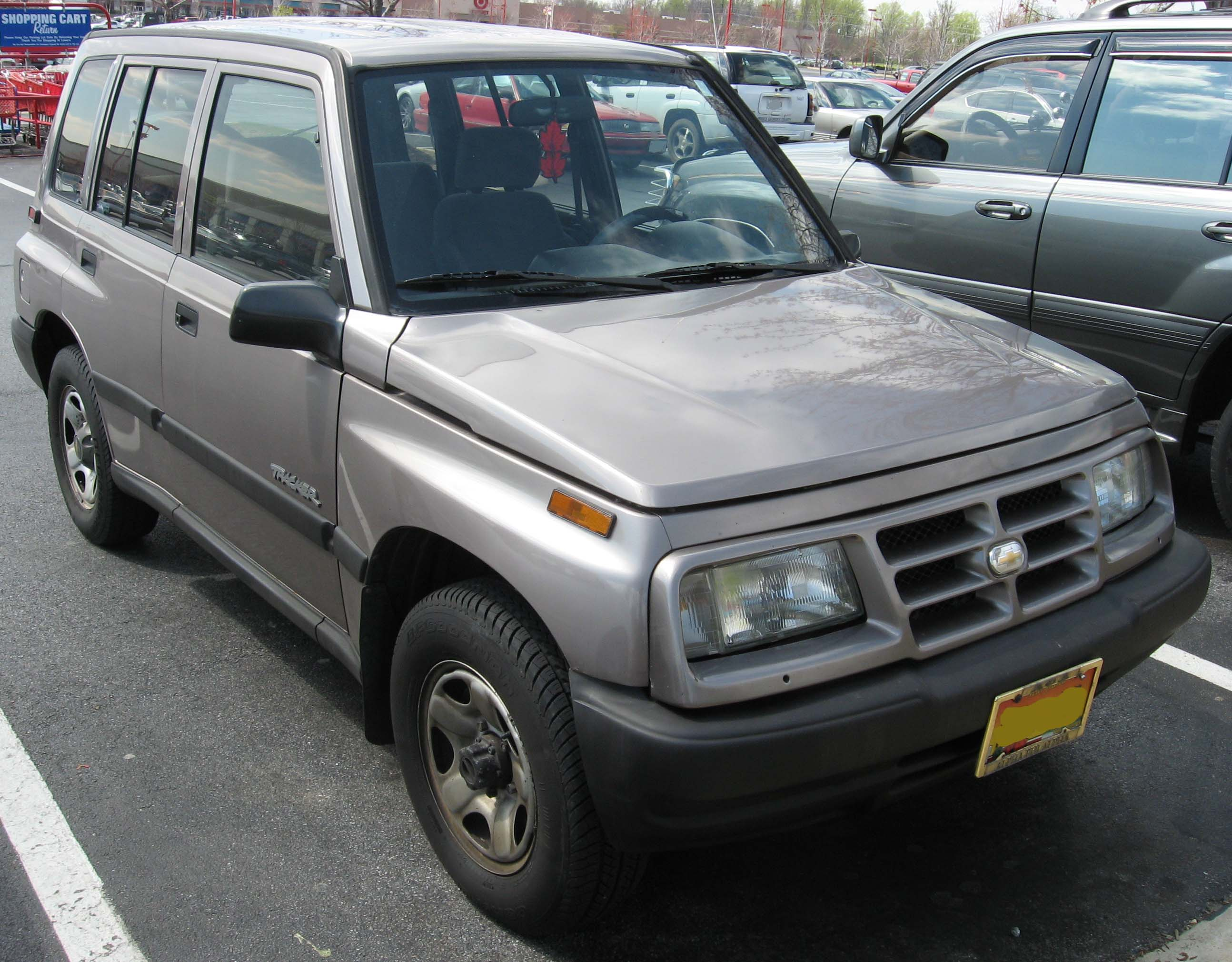
1997 Chevrolet Tracker Sport Utility Vehicle

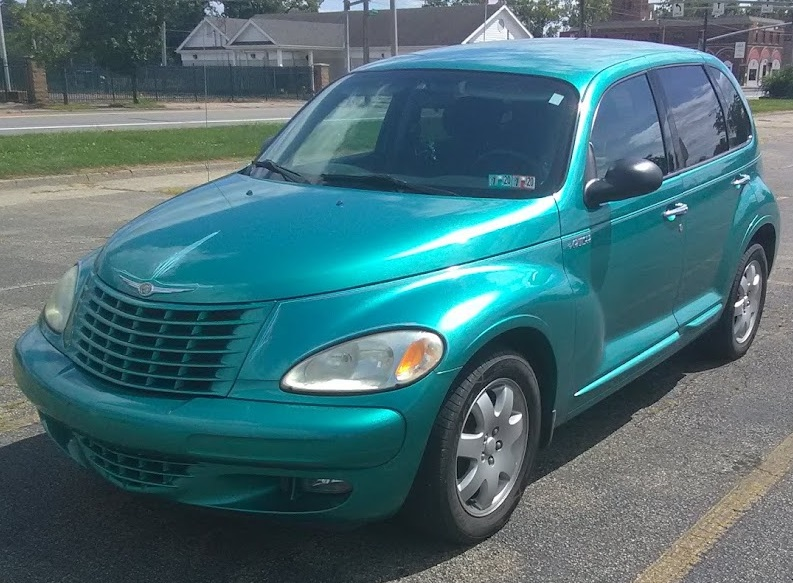
The PT Cruiser was classified as a light truck.

=== Incentive to increase size ===
Under federal regulations, crafted with heavy lobbying input, cars must meet tougher emissions and mileage rules than light trucks. Vehicles that have larger “footprints,” measured as the area between the points where the wheels touch the ground, are allowed less stringent emissions standards. A less than 1 square meter increase in the footprint of a vehicle allows for 2% to 3% more carbon dioxide emissions.

=== Fuel efficiency ===
The United States government uses light truck as a vehicle class in regulating fuel economy through the Corporate Average Fuel Economy (CAFE) standard. The class includes vans, minivans, sport utility vehicles, and pickups. Light trucks have lower fuel economy standards than cars, under the premise that these vehicles are used for utilitarian purposes rather than personal transportation. Because of their body-on-frame construction method, they are heavier than a unibody vehicle of the same size.

=== Tariffs ===
Light truck manufacturing in the United States is protected by the Chicken Tax, a 25% tariff on imported light trucks.

== See also ==
- SUV
- California Air Resources Board
- Commercial vehicle
- Emission standard
