= Amnesty International UK Media Awards 1995 =

The Amnesty International UK Media Awards 1995 were awarded in five categories: National Print, Periodicals, Radio, Television Documentary and Television News. Two awards were given in the Television Documentary category.

The overall winner, and winner of the Television News category, was Sue Lloyd-Roberts, of BBC Breakfast, for her reporting on China's 'laogai' (labour camps). The awards were presented by Pierre Sané and hosted by Peter Snow.
