= Amnesty International South Africa =

- Type: Non-governmental organisation
- Industry: Human rights
- Founded: 1991, South Africa
- Headquarters: Johannesburg, South Africa
- Products: Research, campaigning, advocacy, lobbying
- Revenue: R?(2005)
- Number of employees: 10
- Parent: Amnesty International
- Website: www.amnesty.org.za

Amnesty International South Africa (AISA) is a South African organisation that works to end human rights abuses along with its affiliate organization Amnesty International.

Amnesty International South Africa was founded in 1990 and grew from modest beginnings to become a key player in South Africa's transition to democracy and an important part of Amnesty's international movement, hosting the Amnesty International ICM in 1997. Today Amnesty International South Africa continues to campaign on multiple fronts, including human rights education, women's rights, arms control and Zimbabwe.

== History ==
Amnesty International did not have a group presence in South Africa up to the end of the 1980s because mixed race meetings were not allowed under the apartheid regime. However, there were individual members linked to London. It was only in 1990 when the local situation improved with a reduction in repression and the unbanning of the ANC and its allied organisations, that the International Secretariat allowed the formation of groups in the country.

In 1990 to 1992, four groups started around the country. Port Elizabeth was the first group, followed by Durban, Pietermartizburg and Pretoria. Members from these groups met in 1993 to form a national coordinating committee (some representatives include Piotr Nowosad and Linda Stiebel). By that time there were additional groups in Cape Town, Johannesburg and Grahamstown. A national office was opened in Cape Town in 1995 and moved to Pretoria in 1998. By that time a Board had taken the place of the NCC. A director was appointed for the first time in 2001.

Amnesty South Africa's achievements in the 1990s included lobbying to abolish the death penalty; developing a national police human rights training programme focusing on children's rights; and lobbying to stop South African arms sales to states such as Turkey, Rwanda and Burundi, whose human rights records were questionable. In 1995 Pierre Sane, Amnesty International's secretary general, visited South Africa and met the deputy president Thabo Mbeki to discuss human rights abuses in South Africa, Nigeria and the African Great Lakes region. In 1997, Amnesty South Africa hosted the international movement's ICM meeting in Cape Town, also attended by Nobel prizewinner Archbishop Desmond Tutu.

In 2006 the membership at the AGM voted for the Programme for Growth which allowed the International Mobilisation Fund, based at the International Secretariat, to take over governance and management of the organisation for a period of 2–3 years.

== Campaigns ==
Amnesty International South Africa campaigns for causes including ending gender-based violence, the protection of human rights defenders, climate change and education.

== See also ==
- Human Rights Watch
