= The Forgotten Prisoners =

1961 article by Peter Benenson

"There is a growing tendency all over the world to disguise the
real grounds upon which 'non-conformists' are imprisoned."
— Peter Benenson, "The Forgotten Prisoners", 28 May 1961.

"Any person who is physically restrained (by imprisonment or
otherwise) from expressing (in any form of words or symbols)
an opinion which he honestly holds and which does not advocate
or condone personal violence."
— The article defining the term Prisoner of Conscience.

"Pressure of opinion a hundred years ago brought about the
emancipation of the slaves. It is now for man to insist upon
the same freedom for his mind as he has won for his body."
— Peter Benenson, "The Forgotten Prisoners".

"The Forgotten Prisoners" is an article by Peter Benenson published in The Observer on 28 May 1961. Citing the Universal Declaration of Human Rights articles 18 and 19, it announced a campaign on "Appeal for Amnesty, 1961" and called for "common action". The article also launched the book Persecution 1961 and its stories of doctor Agostinho Neto, philosopher Constantin Noica, lawyer Antonio Amat and Ashton Jones and Patrick Duncan.

Benenson reputedly wrote his article after having learnt that two Portuguese students from Coimbra were imprisoned in Portugal for raising a toast to freedom. The article was reprinted in newspapers across the world and provoked a flood of responses from the readers, marshalling groups in several countries to examine human rights abuses.

While, in 2015, the original story still remains to be verified, the appeal marks the beginning of Amnesty International, founded in London the same year following the publication after Benenson enlisted a Conservative, a Liberal and a Labour MP.
