= Amnesty International Thailand =

- Founded: 1993 (registered in 2003)
- Type: NGO
- Purpose: Defense of human rights
- Headquarters: Bangkok, Thailand
- Fields: Media-attention, direct-appeal campaigns, mobilization, research
- Members: Approximately 1,000 (2016)
- Official languages: Thai, English
- Current Director: Piyanut Kotsan
- Current Chairperson: Pornpen Khongkachonkiet
- Affiliations: Amnesty International
- Website: www.amnesty.or.th/en/

Amnesty International Thailand (AITH), also known as Amnesty Thailand or AI Thailand, is a non-governmental organisation (NGO) focused on the protection of human rights in Thailand and worldwide with more than 1,000 members across Thailand. Amnesty Thailand is one of more than 70 "sections" that make up Amnesty International worldwide.

Amnesty International, as a whole, is an organisation of more than seven million supporters, activists and volunteers in over 150 countries, independent of government, corporate, and other interest groups. It works to mobilise public opinion to put pressure on governments that let abuse take place. The organisation was awarded the Nobel Peace Prize in 1977.

Amnesty International Thailand was established in 1993 and registered with the Thai government ten years later in 2003 as an association. Its headquarters are in Chatuchak, Bangkok. In 2016, Amnesty International opened its South East Asia and Pacific Regional Office in Pathum Wan, Bangkok.

== Campaigns ==
Amnesty became known to the Thai people during the Thammasat University massacre of 6 October 1976. After the successful campaign, more Thai people started to recognize Amnesty. After that, there were more people supporting Amnesty until the election of the Amnesty Commission in Thailand to attend the international Amnesty conference in 1993. AITH was established formally in Thailand in 2003.

In June 2016, Amnesty International Thailand urged the Thai government to drop all charges against 13 pro-democracy activists and release seven activists who were campaigning to reject the new constitution draft in the incoming constitutional referendum.

Amnesty International Thailand, together with Thai Netizen Network, launched an online petition to rewrite amendments to the Computer-related Crime Act aimed at keeping it in conformance with international laws and standards. According to Amnesty Thailand, the bill would pose threats to civil liberties, privacy, trade secrets, and security of the internet.

Amnesty Thailand presents annual media awards to honour Thai media organisations and professionals who have produced outstanding reporting about human rights, in order to promote freedom of the press and encourage more such stories.

== Missions ==
The missions of Amnesty Thailand are based on the tenets of the Universal Declaration of Human Rights. Amnesty Thailand campaigns and advocates for:

- Economic, social and cultural rights
- Freedom of expression, freedom of association, and freedom of assembly
- An end to human rights violations in Myanmar
- Ending the death penalty and torture
- Corporate responsibility
- The protection of the rights of the refugees and migrant workers in Southeast Asia
- Ensuring that those responsible for human rights abuses are held accountable and that victims have access to justice, truth, and reparations.
- Providing human rights education and training of trainers (TOT) to students, educators, community leaders, and government officials

== Organisational structure ==
Amnesty International Thailand is composed of members who elect its board members and chair. Each year there is an annual general meeting (AGM) where the future of the organisation and other topics are being discussed and approved by attending members.

As of 2016 Amnesty Thailand includes at least three main task forces:

- Campaign
  - Policy and Advocacy
  - Activism
  - Media and Communication
- Growth and Mobilisation
  - Fundraising
  - Membership
- Administration
  - Finance

== Support ==
Amnesty Thailand is financially supported by Amnesty International and individual donations from more than 1,000 members across Thailand. The first ever face-to-face fundraising program took place in January 2016 at Victory Monument, Ratchathewi District, and at One Udomsuk community mall, Bang Na District.

== Under military rule ==
After the military seized power in a 2014 coup d'état, Amnesty International Thailand has deep concern about human rights violations and abuses in the country. The organisation is criticized over being a rival of Prayut Chan-o-cha's government and as to serve Thaksinocracy in order to overthrow the royal family.

In July 2015, a board member of Amnesty International Thailand was charged by the police for protesting against the ruling junta's curbs on civil liberties. According to the police he contravened Article 116 of Thailand's Criminal Code.

In November 2016, Amnesty Thailand organized an event to screen the documentary film, "White Shadow, in collaboration with students from Faculty of Humanities and Social Sciences of Khon Kaen University. Despite the local military's permission, the event was barred by faculty's deputy dean because the content was too sensitive for the current situation in the country even though it focused on albinosin Malawi.

== Under 2017 junta constitution ==
In November 2021, Prayut's government started an investigation whether Amnesty International Thailand (AITH) has broken any laws after ultra-royalists called for AITH to be expelled for its support of pro-democracy activists, such as Panusaya (Rung), facing prosecution on royal defamation cases. Under the strict laws against insulting the monarchy, more than 1,600 activists were charged on security laws, including at least 160 people charged with a potential prison term of up to 15 years. Prayut had assigned the Ministry of Interior and the Royal Thai Police to look into the matter, meanwhile the yellow-shirts, pro-government groups rallied in front of the Silom Complex in Bangkok to gather up to one million signatures in support of a campaign to expel AITH from Thailand.

== See also ==
- Amnesty International
- Censorship in Thailand
- Criticism of Amnesty International
- Human rights in Thailand
- Human Rights Watch
