= Diana Redhouse =

Diana Devora Redhouse
- Born: 26 April 1923; London, England
- Died: 19 October 2007 (aged 84)
- Education: Saint Martin's School of Art

Diana Devora Redhouse (26 April 1923 – 19 October 2007) was a British artist, best known as the designer in 1963 of the Amnesty candle, part of Amnesty International's first ever Christmas card, a candle wrapped in barbed wire, chosen because of "its simplicity and the effectiveness of its symbolism".

== Background ==
Redhouse was born in London to Jewish parents of Polish/Russian origin, and educated at a local convent school which only had two or three Jewish girls. She left school at 16, and served in the army during the war, who afterwards helped her get a place at St Martins School of Art.

She founded the Hampstead branch of Amnesty International.

She married the architect Alexander Redhouse, who died in 2004, and they had two daughters.
