= Voiceless Victims =

Voiceless Victims is a fake non-profit organization based in Lille, France. It claims to raise awareness for migrant workers who are victims of human rights abuses in Qatar. However, in December 2016, several news outlets like Le Monde and Forbes showed that it had been spying on Amnesty International. It also tried to spy on Building and Wood Workers' International and Anti-Slavery International. An international investigation by Amnesty International showed that it had sent e-mails with spyware and malware to their staff; that its founder had a fake LinkedIn profile, with false claims of graduating from the University of Oxford; and that its Facebook posts included fake news stories (for example, a fake article never published by Al Jazeera). Moreover, when they visited the address of its headquarters, Amnesty International found no office, and neighbours said they had never heard of the organisation. Meanwhile, Le Monde did its own investigation and found out that no such organisation was ever registered in France.
