= Amnesty International New Zealand =

- Type: Non-Governmental Organisation
- Industry: human rights
- Founded: 1965, New Zealand
- Headquarters: Auckland, New Zealand
- Key people: Jacqui Dillon, Nirupa George, Amy Thompson
- Products: Lobbying, human rights research, consultancy, campaigning
- Revenue: 4,675,055 New Zealand dollar (2024)
- Total assets: 1,462,456 New Zealand dollar (2024)
- Number of employees: 22 (2024)
- Parent: Amnesty International
- Website: www.amnesty.org.nz

Amnesty International New Zealand is a part of the Amnesty International network, an international nonprofit organisation working to end human rights abuses. It is one of over 70 nationally organised sections or national offices of the global Amnesty movement.

The first New Zealand Amnesty group was founded in 1965, and the organisation was incorporated in 1966. Since being founded, the organisation has worked to free prisoners of conscience, fight human rights violations around the world, and promote human rights in New Zealand through lobbying and education. It works to achieve human rights for everyone as defined by the Universal Declaration of Human Rights and other international standards for human rights. It now has 9,000 members.

Amnesty International New Zealand acts primarily with a focus on rights within the Asia-Pacific region, and is a consulting member of the Council for International Development and part of the Human Rights Network of Aotearoa New Zealand.

== Structure ==
Amnesty International New Zealand is financially independent from all governments and corporations, funded entirely by individual supporters. The International Movement is made up of 70 “sections” or national offices with 10 million fee-paying members. Its Secretariat is based in London although it has many offices around the world. In Asia-Pacific, it has offices in Bangkok and Colombo. Its Hong Kong office (and separate Section) closed in 2022 following significant pressure from the Chinese Government. Other offices to close in recent times due to Government pressure include Ukraine, India, Russia.

It is led at the New Zealand national level by the Governance Team; members are elected by members at the Annual General Meeting and help set out policy and strategic goals that guide operations.

Its current chair is Nirupa George with Sara Lindsay the immediate past Chair. Former Chair, Heather Hayden sits on the International Nominations Committee (INC) of the global movement since 2023. Another former Chair, Rosslyn Noonan, is a member (since 2021) of the PrepCom - another global committee of Amnesty responsible for the Global Assembly (GA), the Movement’s highest decision making body.

Another former Chair (2015-2019), Tiumalu Lauvale Peter Fa'afiu, was the first Chair of Pacific descent for any Section in the international movement's history. In August 2019, Peter was appointed Director on Amnesty’s International Board making him only the third New Zealander to sit on the IB and the first of Polynesian descent. He was Vice Chair of the IB from 2021 - 2023 and Interim Chair in 2024 becoming an influential human rights figure.

The New Zealand office is located in Auckland, and run by an Executive Director / CEO. The office comprises a campaigning team, fundraising team, and general operations team, with both paid and volunteer staff.

As with every Section, AIANZ works closely with the International Secretariat to implement the Movement’s Global Strategic Framework.

== Campaigns ==
Current priority campaigns include Crisis Response, Stop Torture, Refugees Crisis, and Individuals at Risk. Amnesty International New Zealand also works to end human rights violations in the Asia-Pacific region and promote human rights awareness in New Zealand.

=== Crisis Response ===
Amnesty International Aotearoa New Zealand works to respond to global crises as they occur. Its current campaigns are to end human rights abuses in Israel and Gaza, Syria, Egypt and Central African Republic.

=== Stop Torture ===
Amnesty International is working worldwide for governments to end the practice of torture. It is actively lobbying the governments of Mexico, Nigeria and the Philippines to ban torture.

=== Individuals at Risk ===
When individuals suffer grave human rights abuses, Amnesty International New Zealand takes action for their support. Recent successes include the release of Meriam Ibrahim, condemned to death in Sudan for apostasy; Nasrin Sotoudeh, an imprisoned Iranian human rights lawyer; and a reduced sentence for Dr Tun Tun Hein, an imprisoned community leader in Myanmar.

=== Refugees and Asylum Seekers ===
Amnesty International campaigns to ensure the rights of refugees and asylum seekers are protected by working to prevent human rights violations that cause people to flee their homes. At the same time, it opposes the forcible return of any individual facing serious human rights violations.

One such case is of former Islamic Salvation Front member Ahmed Zaoui, who was seeking asylum in New Zealand. Amnesty International didn't take a position on whether Ahmed Zaoui is guilty of the charges laid against him, but argued that he had not received fair criminal trials in Algeria, Belgium, or France, and that Switzerland's rejection of his refugee claim and subsequent deportation to Burkina Faso was improper. Zaoui was bailed in 2004 and the New Zealand government withdrew objections to his refugee status in 2007.

=== Asia-Pacific ===
With no official Amnesty presence in the Pacific, Amnesty International New Zealand has a unique responsibility to protect human rights in the region. It campaigns to end violence against women in countries like Papua New Guinea with extremely high rates of sexual and gender-based violence, and works to protect freedom of expression in countries like Fiji.

=== Other Campaigns ===
Amnesty International strongly supports the creation of a United Nations treaty to control small arms. Amnesty International New Zealand gathered over 12,000 faces in a photo-petition it handed in to the New Zealand Government. Minister for Disarmament Phil Goff declared New Zealand's strong support for such a treaty after receiving the petition.

New Zealand is the first nation in negotiations for a free trade agreement with China. As a result of this, and New Zealand's proximity to the nation, Amnesty International New Zealand is trying to highlight human rights in the People's Republic of China. The organisation is particularly concerned about freedom of speech issues, and censorship of the internet by the government and companies such as Google and Yahoo.

The Darfur conflict in Sudan is one of Amnesty International's top priorities, as a result of the large-scale human rights abuses occurring. AIANZ has called for the introduction of a United Nations peacekeeping force to prevent conflict and stop further unnecessary suffering.

Amnesty International also supports the implementation of the New Zealand Government's Action Plan for Human Rights.

Following years of campaigning, the New Zealand government in September 2018 announced an increase of 500 more refugees to its refugee quota.

=== International Board ===
In August 2019, Peter Fa'afiu was elected to the International Board of the Global Movement. He is the third New Zealander and is the first of Polynesian descent to sit on the International Board.
