= Amnesty International Philippines =

Amnesty International Philippines (AIPh) is a human rights organization in the Philippines, Manila. It's an independent organization with the famous parent organization Amnesty International (AI). Among its goals are networking, strengthening the local human rights movement, and lobbying. It works for the passage of anti-torture legislation, ratification of the Optional Protocol to the Convention against Torture (OPCAT), passage of the Reproductive Health Law (RH Law), enactment of a domestic International Humanitarian Law (IHL), work on juvenile justice, repeal of the death penalty law, and passage of the Anti-Violence Against Women and their Children Act (Anti-VAWC). AIPh was officially registered in 1987 by a board of trustees made up of Edmundo Garcia, Reynaldo Ty, Fe Agpaoa, Gina Putong, Che Duran, Ruth Alegre, Shiela Sison, Nelson Rendon and Ma. Cecilia Macatangay.
