= Anette Fischer =

Danish librarian and human rights activist

Anette Fischer née Klavsen (1946–1992) was a Danish librarian and human rights activist. After heading the Danish branch of Amnesty International, in 1989 she was appointed a member of the organization's International Executive Committee (IEC), becoming its head in 1991. She died together with her husband in a car accident in Florence, Italy, in July 1992.

== Early life and education ==
Born on 13 July 1946 in the Copenhagen district of Frederiksberg, Anette Klavsen was the daughter of Anders Peter Klavsen (died 1922) and Klara Emilie Mikkelsen (1921–1996). Brought up in the Copenhagen suburbs, after matriculating from Ballerup Gymnasium in 1965, she studied public librarianship at Danmarks Biblioteksskole, graduating in 1970.

While still at university, she began to take interest in Amnesty International in 1969.

== Career ==
In early 1972, together with her newly wedded husband the engineer Carl Eli Seidel Fischer, she moved to Tanzania where she established a film library in Dar-es-Salaam's Audio Visual Institute. On returning to Denmark in 1974, she first worked in the library at the Danish Film Institute before being appointed reference librarian at the public library in Rødovre.

She became so effective at expanding the library's reference works that she was allowed to devote some of her time to the Danish branch of Amnesty International (AI) over a number of years. After working as a campaign coordinator for the organization, in 1983 she was appointed a member of the Danish board. From 1986, she served as chair of the Danish branch before becoming a member of AI's most important decision-making authority, the International Executive Committee (IEC), in 1989. Two years later, with her appointment as head of the board, she became the first woman and the first Dane to head Amnesty International.

While working for AI in Denmark, she fought for the release of prisoners of conscience and against human rights abuses in Chile, South Africa and the Soviet Union. She also set up a Danish group to campaign against torture and the death penalty and to prevent disappearances in Argentina. After becoming chair of the Danish branch, she ran campaigns against mass executions in Iran and abuses in Israeli-occupied territories.

Chosen to coordinate AI's work in the European Community, she campaigned against member states' restrictive asylum developments for those seeking to escape torture, imprisonment or death. In 1989, as a member of AI's IEC, she was involved in responding to the suppression of democracy in China and in coordinating work on human-rights education, in particular with a view to preventing torture and the death penalty in Asia, Africa and Latin America. Fischer travelled throughout the Middle East and North Africa, extending AI membership and spreading its views. In 1990, she represented AI at the Second International Human Rights Conference in Vilnius and Leningrad.

After being appointed head of the IEC, demands on her time for voluntary work increased, forcing her to cut her paid library work to half time. Her husband helped her along and took her on holidays to reduce the stress. It was when they were returning from a holiday in Italy that they both died in a head-on collision in torrential rain in Florence on 11 July 1992.
