= Criticism of Amnesty International =

Criticism surrounding the non-governmental organisation

Criticism of Amnesty International includes claims of selection bias, as well as ideology and foreign policy biases. Various governments criticised by Amnesty International have in turn criticised the organization, complaining about what they assert constituted one-sided reporting.

Separate to its human rights reporting, Amnesty has been criticised for the high salaries of some of its staff, as well as its workplace environment, including the issue of institutional discrimination within the organization.

== Criticism by country ==
=== Allegations of pro-Western bias ===
This includes non-Western governments claiming Amnesty is ideologically biased against them, such as those of the Democratic Republic of the Congo, the People's Republic of China, and Vietnam.

== Decriminalisation of abortion ==
Since Amnesty International's 2007 shift to supporting the decriminalisation of abortion, it has been criticised by senior figures in the Catholic Church (see Catholic Church and abortion), traditionally a strong supporter of Amnesty International, and US legislators. Amnesty spokeswoman Suzanne Trimel estimated that a "handful, probably less than 200" of over 400,000 members had quit over the issue.

The Catholic Church's Pontifical Council for Justice and Peace in June 2007 issued a statement urging Catholics not to donate to Amnesty because of its abortion stance. The Church withdrew funding globally for Amnesty, and churches in various locations took other steps to sever their ties with the group.

== Decriminalisation of sex work ==
Since 2016, Amnesty International’s policy calls for the decriminalization of all aspects of consensual adult sex work. This is based on evidence and the real-life experience of sex workers themselves that criminalization makes them less safe.

In June 2013, confusion arose when a local chapter of Amnesty UK called Paisley Branch endorsed a Scottish bill that sought to criminalise sex work. Amnesty UK had its name removed from the list of supporters of the bill, stating that it ran contrary to its international policy not to criminalise 'the sex worker herself or himself' nor 'consensual sex between adults', and 'no conflating trafficking and sex work'. The issue forced Amnesty International to clarify its position on the legal status of sex work.

When a draft copy of the policy appeared in early 2014, several abolitionist feminists and former sex workers condemned the proposal.

On 7 July 2015 an updated draft was released to Amnesty International members. The New York Times reported that, although 'some complain[ed] that it was conceived at Amnesty's headquarters in London', 'various versions have been reviewed by the organization's national chapters, and a consensus emerged supporting decriminalization for just the prostitutes, according to minutes of organizational meetings.' The July 2015 draft policy was the result of two years of research and consultations with its members, and proposed to decriminalise both sellers and buyers of sex; it was scheduled to be put to a vote by about 500 Amnesty delegates from more than 80 countries at an Amnesty International conference in Dublin in August 2015. The proposal was criticised by abolitionist feminist organisations, including The Coalition Against Trafficking of Women (CATW), who published an open letter signed by over 400 advocates and organisations, condemning "Amnesty's proposal to adopt a policy that calls for the decriminalization of pimps, brothel owners and buyers of sex – the pillars of a $99 billion global sex industry". Contrary to claims that decriminalisation would make prostituted people safer, CATW pointed to research which alleged that deregulation of the sex industry had produced catastrophic results in several countries: "the German government, for example, which deregulated the industry of prostitution in 2002, has found that the sex industry was not made safer for women after the enactment of its law. Instead, the explosive growth of legal brothels in Germany has triggered an increase in sex trafficking." CATW instead asked Amnesty to support the so-called Nordic model, in which sex buyers and pimps are criminalized, while prostituted people are decriminalized.

In early August 2015, a large number of NGOs published an open letter in support of the decriminalization proposal. The organizations supporting Amnesty International's position included the Global Network of Sex Work Projects (NSWP), the Committee on the Rights of Sex Workers in Europe (ICRSE), Sex Workers' Rights Advocacy Network in Central and Eastern Europe and Central Asia (SWAN), Human Rights Watch, and the Global Alliance Against Traffic in Women.

On 11 August 2015, the International Council Meeting (ICM) voted in favour of a resolution which authorised the International Board to develop and adopt the decriminalisation policy. The New York Times described it as the result of 'days of emotional debates and intense lobbying', reporting that the abolitionist camp's lobbying was particularly 'aggressive', but a majority voted for the decriminalisation proposal as 'the best way to reduce risks for prostitutes' against 'arbitrary arrest and detention, extortion and harassment, and physical and sexual violence'. After the vote, a French abolitionist group announced it would no longer work with Amnesty in the future.

In May 2016, Amnesty published its policy calling on governments around the world to decriminalise consensual sex work as the best way to improve the human rights of sex workers, and rejecting the 'Nordic model'; some abolitionist groups criticised the move.

== Misogyny ==
Gita Sahgal, the head of Amnesty gender unit was suspended in 2010 following a row with the organization's leadership. Sahgal said that it suffered from "ideological bankruptcy" and "misogyny". According to Sahgal, platforming the former Guantanamo inmate Moazzam Begg and the association with the Cageprisoners group undermined Amnesty's support for women's rights.

== Reports on the 2014 Gaza War ==
In 2015, Amnesty published the report titled "Unlawful and Deadly: Rocket and mortar attacks by Palestinian armed groups during the 2014 Gaza/Israel conflict" describing human rights violations during the 2014 Gaza War. The scholar Norman Finkelstein, in Gaza: An Inquest into Its Martyrdom writes that the report disproportionately focused on the actions of Palestinian armed groups while under-reporting and under-emphasizing the scale and context of Israeli military actions.

Finkelstein criticised the report for its heavy reliance on Israeli sources and a narrative which downplayed Israeli actions while highlighting those of the Palestinian armed groups. By focusing on the Palestinian armed groups' use of unguided rockets, Finkelstein writes that the report failed to adequately address the asymmetry of power between Israel and Gaza's armed groups and the resulting disparity in the impact of their respective offensives. As a particular example, the report describes the Hamas arsenal without citing sources for these claims:

The majority of Israel's 8.3 million people, and all 2.8 million Palestinians in the occupied West Bank... are now within range of at least some of the rockets held by Palestinian armed groups in the Gaza Strip

The report also cited the Israeli allegation that it had intercepted a vessel carrying Iranian rockets "bound for Gaza" but failed to mention that a UN expert panel found that the Iranian weapons were in fact bound for Sudan. Finkelstein also points out that the report cited the Israeli claim that the ground invasion had been launched to "destroy the tunnel system..., particularly those with shafts discovered near residential areas located in Israel" but failed to cite the official Israeli documentation demonstrating that these tunnels had only been used for military operations.

Finkelstein also stated that the report shifted culpability of Israel's attacks on mosques, schools, hospitals, ambulances and the power plant from Israel to Hamas by citing statements from Israeli officials denying that, for example, the power plant had been intentionally targeted. Finkelstein accused Amnesty of whitewashing Israel's attacks by assuming the presence of a valid military objective when no evidence suggesting the presence of a military objective had been presented.

Finkelstein's book also questioned the report’s legal analysis, claiming that it applied international law in a biased manner that favored Israeli interpretations. He asserted that Amnesty International had adopted a distorted understanding of concepts such as proportionality and distinction which, as he argued, effectively whitewashed potential war crimes committed by the IDF.

Amnesty later published a second report titled "'Black Friday' Carnage in Rafah during 2014 Israel/Gaza conflict" on the 4 day bombing of Rafah. The report describes the attack as disproportionate, indiscriminate and accuses the Israeli military of failing to take all reasonable precautions. Finkelstein writes that the principle of proportionality is only relevant when a valid military objective is being pursued. In this case, testimonies from IDF soldiers reveal that the bombing campaign was an invocation of the Hannibal Directive in response to the kidnapping of IDF Lieutenant Hadar Goldin where the objective was to prevent his capture by ensuring he would not survive the bombing. Finkelstein claims that the targeting of Goldin in order to prevent a prisoner swap cannot be considered to be a valid military objective and thus the appropriate legal principle is the deliberate targeting of civilians and civilian objects. The report presents evidence which, according to Finkelstein, Amnesty fails to appropriately analyze from a legal perspective. For example, Finkelstein quotes from the report:

On 1 August, amid "heavy bombardment of a civilian area," a drone-launched missile killed a 20-year-old man. Multiple witnesses recalled relentless bombing, shelling, and missile attacks, while "people were running... all raising white flags."

The report observes that this attack "appeared to be indiscriminate," while Finkelstein writes that the lack of a plausible military target indicates a deliberate attack on civilians.

== Israel ==
In 2010 Frank Johansson, the chairman of Amnesty International-Finland called Israel a nilkkimaa, a derogatory term variously translated as "scum state", "creep state" or "punk state". Johansson stood by his statement, saying that it was based on Israel's "repeated flouting of international law", and his own personal experiences with Israelis. When asked by a journalist if any other country on earth that could be described in these terms, he said that he could not think of any, although some individual "Russian officials" could be so described. According to Israeli professor Gerald M. Steinberg of NGO Monitor, a pro Israel campaign group: "Amnesty International has promoted an intense anti-Israel ideology, resulting in statements like these."

The Israel Ministry of Foreign Affairs criticised the May 2012 report on administrative detention saying it was "one sided", and "not particularly serious", and "that it seemed little more than a public relations gimmick". The Israeli embassy in London called Amnesty "ridiculous". Amnesty said that this report "is not intended to address violations of detainees' rights by the Palestinian Authority, or the Hamas de facto administration. These violations have been and will continue to be addressed separately by the organisation".

In November 2012, Amnesty UK began a disciplinary process against staffer Kristyan Benedict, Amnesty UK campaigns manager, because of a posting on his Twitter account, said to be anti-semitic, regarding three Jewish members of parliament and Operation Pillar of Defense where he wrote: "Louise Ellman, Robert Halfon and Luciana Berger walk into a bar ... each orders a round of B52s ... #Gaza". Amnesty International UK said "the matter has been referred to our internal and confidential processes." Amnesty's campaigns director Tim Hancock said, "We do not believe that humour is appropriate in the current circumstances, particularly from our own members of staff." An Amnesty International UK spokesperson later said the charity had decided that "the tweet in question was ill-advised and had the potential to be offensive and inflammatory but was not racist or antisemitic."

In the April 2015 annual Amnesty International UK AGM, delegates voted (468 votes to 461) against a motion proposing a campaign against antisemitism in the UK. The debate on the motion formed a consensus that Amnesty should fight "discrimination against all ethnic and religious groups", but were divided over the issue of an anti-racism campaign with a "single focus". The Jewish Chronicle noted that Amnesty International had previously published a report on discrimination against Muslims in Europe. NGO monitor released a statement saying the decision "highlights the hypocrisy and moral bankruptcy of what was once a leader in human rights advocacy."

In November 2016, Amnesty International conducted a second internal investigation of Benedict for comparing Israel to the Islamic state.

In November 2019, after the building of a Palestinian human rights organisation was struck in Gaza, Amnesty International immediately accused Israel of being responsible. Subsequently a Fox News journalist said that he witnessed a rocket fired from Gaza that hit the building and an article in Haaretz came to the conclusion that it was a stray rocket launched by the Islamic Jihad. Amnesty issued a tweet saying that "Conflicting information is circulating about ... where the attack came from".

In April 2021, Amnesty International distanced itself from a tweet written in 2013 by its new Secretary General, Agnès Callamard, which read: ""NYT Interview of Shimon Perres [sic] where he admits that Yasser Arafat was murdered"; Amnesty responded by saying: "The tweet was written in haste and is incorrect. It does not reflect the position of Amnesty International or Agnès Callamard." Callamard herself has not deleted the tweet.

On March 11, 2022, Paul O'Brien, the Amnesty International USA Director stated at a private event: "We are opposed to the idea — and this, I think, is an existential part of the debate — that Israel should be preserved as a state for the Jewish people", while adding "Amnesty takes no political views on any question, including the right of the State of Israel to survive." He also rejected a poll that found 8 in 10 American Jews were pro-Israel, saying: "I believe my gut tells me that what Jewish people in this country want is to know that there's a sanctuary that is a safe and sustainable place that the Jews, the Jewish people can call home." On March 14, 2022, all 25 Jewish Democrats in the House of Representatives issued a rare joint statement rebuking O'Brien, saying that he "has added his name to the list of those who, across centuries, have tried to deny and usurp the Jewish people's independent agency" and "condemning this and any antisemitic attempt to deny the Jewish people control of their own destiny." On March 25, 2022, O'Brien wrote to the Jewish congressmen: "I regret representing the views of the Jewish people."

== Reporting on the 2019 fuel protests in Iran ==
On 19 November 2019, Amnesty International reported that at least 106 civilians had been "unlawfully killed" by Iranian security forces during the 2019 Iranian protests which were triggered by outrage over a sudden increase in gasoline prices. Amnesty later revised the figure upwards to 304, claiming that unarmed protesters had been deliberately massacred by the authorities who had "green lighted" a brutal crackdown to suppress dissent. The Iranian authorities, whilst acknowledging that some armed rioters had been shot by police, rejected Amnesty's figure as "sheer lies" and part of a "disinformation campaign waged against Iran from outside the country".

Judiciary spokesman, Gholamhussein Esmayeeli, countered that it was armed rioters who had actually killed many people, but that Amnesty and other organizations had nonetheless, "named people who have died in other incidents that are different from the recent riots and many of those people claimed to be killed are alive". In a thinly veiled rebuttal to Amnesty, Prosecutor-General Mohammad Montazeri retorted that, "people, who are outside the country, have no access to exact information and accurate figures. They provide different figures which are invalid." In its 16 December press release, Amnesty's research director for MENA, Philip Luther, moreover, did not acknowledge the widespread arson, vandalism and looting apparent during the protests/riots, that led to the forceful response, or the reported killing of security officers either. He also appeared to misquote supreme Leader, Ali Khamenei, as stating that all those protesting in the streets were "villains". The Iranian leader had, in fact, distinguished between those peacefully objecting to the government policy and those who destroyed property: "Some people are no doubt worried by this decision (to raise the price of gasoline) ... but sabotage and arson is done by villains, not our people." Khamenei further elaborated that those killed in any crossfire between the security forces and armed rioters/saboteurs were to be regarded as "martyrs".

On 20 May 2020, Amnesty published a final report on the protests where, for the first time, it named 232 out of the 304 alleged victims. Amnesty also acknowledged that many of those killed were bystanders who were not even protesting at the time of their death. The report was itself heavily criticised by two independent analysts who accused Amnesty of distorting many facts, making unsupported claims and ignoring key evidence. On 1 June 2020, an Iranian lawmaker, Mojtaba Zolnour, made it known that 230 persons had been killed, including 6 security officers and 40 from the Baseej volunteer force. More than a quarter were bystanders who he alleged were killed by rioters.

== Workplace bullying ==
=== 2019 workplace bullying report ===
In February 2019, Amnesty International's management team offered to resign. The offer came after an independent report by Konterra group found what it called a "toxic culture" of workplace bullying, as well as numerous evidences of bullying, harassment, sexism and racism. The report was commissioned by Amnesty after the investigation of the suicides of 30-year Amnesty veteran Gaëtan Mootoo in Paris in May 2018 (who left a note citing work pressures), and 28-year-old intern Rosalind McGregor in Geneva in July 2018. The Konterra report found that: "39 per cent of Amnesty International staff reported that they developed mental or physical health issues as the direct result of working at Amnesty". The report concluded, "organisational culture and management failures are the root cause of most staff wellbeing issues.".

The report said that efforts by Amnesty to address its problems had been "ad hoc, reactive, and inconsistent," and that staff described the senior leadership team as out-of-touch, incompetent and callous. Those signing a letter offering to resign were the senior directors of research, the Secretary General's office, global fundraising, global operations, people and services, law and policy and campaigns and communications. However, Amnesty International's Secretary General Kumi Naidoo did not accept resignations and instead offered generous redundancies to managers concerned, including to Mootoo's senior director Anna Neistat directly implicated in the report on Mootoo's death. Naidoo stated that his priority was "to rebuild trust at a dangerous time when Amnesty was needed more than ever".

After none of the managers were held accountable, a group of workers petitioned for Amnesty's chief to resign. On 5 December 2019 Naidoo resigned from his post of Amnesty's Secretary General, citing ill health. Julie Verhaar was appointed as interim Secretary General the same day.

=== 2020 workplace suicide payout ===
In September 2020 The Times reported that Amnesty International paid £800,000 in compensation over the workplace suicide of Gaëtan Mootoo and demanded his family keep the deal secret. The pre-trial agreement between London-based Amnesty's International Secretariat and Motoo's wife was reached on the condition that she keeps the deal secret by signing NDA. This was done particularly to prevent discussing the settlement with the press or on social media. The arrangement led to criticism on social media, with people asking why an organisation such as Amnesty would condone the use of non-disclosure agreements. Shaista Aziz, co-founder of the feminist advocacy group NGO Safe Space, questioned on Twitter why the "world's leading human rights organisation" was employing such contracts.

== India ==
On 29 September 2020, the Indian offshoot of Amnesty International released a statement announcing suspension of its operations in the country after the Enforcement Directorate, which investigates financial crimes and irregularities in India, ordered the freezing of its bank accounts. In a statement, the Indian Ministry of Home Affairs said that Amnesty had contravened Indian laws by receiving funds from abroad. Amnesty, which said it had been harassed by the Indian government for its actions on human rights, particularly for its call for accountability in the Indian state of Kashmir following its revocation of special status, denied the charges and stated that it would appeal in Indian courts.

Earlier, in 2009, Amnesty's Indian offshoot suspended its India operations as the UPA government rejected its application for receiving foreign funding.

== Alexei Navalny ==
On February 24, 2021, Amnesty announced that it would strip Alexei Navalny of his status as a prisoner of conscience on account of comments he had made about migrants in 2007 and 2008. Amnesty said that the statements by Navalny, who had been poisoned by Novichok in 2020 and imprisoned by Russia in February 2021, could amount to incitement to discrimination, violence or hostility, met the level of "hate speech", and were thus incompatible with the label "prisoner of conscience".

Amnesty's decision was met by criticism from supporters, British parliamentarians, and opposition figures in Russia. Critics noted that many of the original complaints that led Amnesty to rescind its designation had cited material that originated with a Twitter account that appeared to be linked to the Russian state, and Amnesty's Russia media manager asserted that there appeared to be a coordinated campaign by pro-Kremlin forces to discredit Navalny; in celebrating the decision, the head of Russia's state-funded TV network RT, Margarita Simonyan, referred to the source of the original allegations against Navalny as "our columnist." The decision appeared to have been made by Amnesty's London Headquarters without the consultation of its Moscow branch; on February 27, 2021, Julie Vahaar, Amnesty's secretary-general, announced an internal inquiry into the process by which Amnesty had redesignated Navalny, saying that Amnesty had been targeted by a "Russian government smear campaign." In a private Zoom call with pro-Russian pranksters posing as Navalny's associates, members of Amnesty's leadership, including Vahaar, admitted that the move had "done a lot of damage."

On May 7, 2021, Amnesty redesignated Navalny as a Prisoner of Conscience. It released a public statement that said some of Navalny's past comments were "reprehensible" and that it does not approve of them. However, it also believed that people shouldn't be "forever trapped by their past conduct" and why it has altered its rules to no longer automatically refuse people the status of Prisoners of Conscience "solely based on their conduct in the past", as people's "opinions and behaviour may evolve over time". Amnesty apologized, saying it had "made a wrong decision" and apologizing personally to Navalny "and the activists in Russia and around the world who tirelessly campaign for his freedom" for the negative impacts their decision had had; Amnesty also observed that their actions had been used to "further violate Navalny's rights." It also clarified that in redesignating Navalny a POC, Amnesty was not implying any endorsement of his political programme but "highlighting the urgent need for his rights, including access to independent medical care, to be recognised and acted upon by the Russian authorities". Leonid Volkov, Navalny's chief of staff, responded on Twitter that "the ability to recognize mistakes and move on is the most important thing that distinguishes normal people from Putins [sic]". Amnesty also stated that it would reconsider the process by which it designated individuals as Prisoners of Conscience.

== 2022 Russian invasion of Ukraine ==
=== Dissolution by the Russian government ===
In early March 2022, during the 2022 Russian invasion of Ukraine, Roskomnadzor blocked the Russian-language website of Amnesty International. In early April 2022, the Russian Ministry of Justice announced that it would forcibly shut down the Russian branch of Amnesty International, saying that the organisation had committed "violations of the current legislation of the Russian Federation."

=== Report on placement of Ukrainian forces in civilian areas ===
On 4 August 2022, Amnesty International published a report saying that it had found evidence that the Armed Forces of Ukraine had based forces and weapons in residential areas on several occasions when there were viable alternatives nearby. Amnesty, further stated that, while these cases did not justify Russian attacks on civilians, and that in a number of cases it had investigated Ukrainian forces had not acted similarly, these tactics risked endangering civilians. The Amnesty report followed a report from the Office of the UN High Commissioner for Human Rights in June that had warned that both Russian and Ukrainian forces had established themselves "either in residential areas or near civilian objects, from where they launched military operations without taking measures for the protection of civilians present, as required under international humanitarian law" and a report from Human Rights Watch in July that said it had found evidence of three cases where "Ukrainian forces based forces among homes where people were living but took no apparent action to move residents to safer areas" and four cases of Russian forces doing the same.

The Amnesty report sparked significant outrage in Ukraine. Ukrainian President Volodymyr Zelenskyy accused Amnesty of trying to "amnesty the terrorist state and shift the responsibility from the aggressor to the victim", while Ukrainian Minister of Foreign Affairs Dmytro Kuleba stated that the report creates "a false balance between the oppressor and the victim, between the country that is destroying hundreds and thousands of civilians, cities, territories and [a] country that is desperately defending itself". The Kyiv Independent editorial team strongly criticised the report, pointing out flaws in reasoning and stating that "Amnesty [International] could not properly articulate who the main perpetrator of violence in Ukraine was".

The report also generated significant controversy within other Western countries. An editorial published by British newspaper The Times described Amnesty International as "Putin's propagandists", noting that the organization already has a "previous form in abasing itself before the Kremlin" by refusing to recognize Russian opposition leader Alexei Navalny as a prisoner of conscience, and stating that "Amnesty evidently learnt nothing from that fiasco". British conservative journalist Stephen Pollard wrote on The Daily Telegraph that Amnesty was "utterly morally bankrupt" and that it was driven by an "anti-Western obsession".

Amnesty's report was criticized by John Spencer, a retired U.S. Army major, who stated that “If the Ukrainians moved out into the open and brought the fight to the Russian military, the war would have already ended — they would have all died.”. United Nations war crime investigator Marc Garlasco stated that the Amnesty report got the law wrong, and also that Ukraine was making efforts to protect civilians, including helping them to relocate. Further criticism came from French philosopher Bernard-Henri Lévy and by Italian journalist Lorenzo Cremonesi.

The report, however, was praised by several Russian and pro-Russian figures, including the Russian embassy in London, causing further criticism against the organization.

Following the publication of the report, Oksana Pokalchuk, head of Amnesty International in Ukraine, resigned from her post, left the organization and published an explanation in The Washington Post on 13 August. Amnesty International Sweden cofounder Per Wästberg also terminated his relationship with the organization in protest to the report. Amnesty's Canadian branch issued a statement expressing regret for among other things the "insufficient context and legal analysis". On 12 August, Amnesty's German branch issued a statement apologizing for aspects of the report's release and its effect, saying that it would be examined through a process initiated at the international level to determine what went wrong, and condemning its instrumentalization by Russian authorities.

Amnesty commissioned an independent review into the report, that was leaked to The New York Times in mid-April 2023 and was published publicly by Amnesty in mid-May 2023. The review found that the "principal factual finding" of the report was "reasonably substantiated by the evidence presented," but that the report had a number of shortcomings, including overstating the legal interpretation that Ukrainian forces has violated humanitarian law, using "ambiguous, imprecise and in some respects legally questionable" language in the press release, and that there was a "failure to proactively seek Amnesty Ukraine's viewpoint and contextual understanding."

== See also ==
- Criticism of Human Rights Watch
