= Eric Baker (activist) =

British activist (1920–1976)

- Born: 22 September 1920; London, England
- Died: 11 July 1976 (aged 55); Southminster, Essex, England
- Resting place: Quaker Meeting House, Maldon, Essex
- Known for: Co-founding the global human rights organisation Amnesty International

Eric Baker (22 September 1920 – 11 July 1976) was a British activist and one of the founders of the human rights group Amnesty International, and the second Secretary-General of the organization. He was also a founder of the Campaign for Nuclear Disarmament (CND).

Baker was a member of the Religious Society of Friends (Quakers), and served as head of the Quaker Peace and Social Witness, an organization of Quakers in Britain working to promote and practise the Quaker testimonies of peace, equality, simplicity and truth.

His resting place is the Quaker Meeting House in Maldon, Essex, England where he attended Meeting For Worship on a Sunday. The Meeting is still active today.

== Life and career ==
A pacifist, Baker was registered as a conscientious objector during World War II. His description of justifying this to his tribunal remains in the current (Fifth) edition of British Yearly Meeting's Quaker Faith and Practice. During the war, Baker worked on the "Famine Relief" campaign, raising funds to send food to the war-torn European continent, educate the British public, and pressure the government. From 1946 to 1948 he was appointed as a joint secretary of the Quaker Centre in Delhi, India, with his wife Joyce.

Baker was general secretary of the National Peace Council from 1954 to 1959. In this role he wrote an article entitled 'Psychological warfare a challenge to democracy', and a policy statement on a 'Campaign to secure international agreement on the prohibition of nuclear weapons', in December 1959.

In the late 1950s and early 1960s, Baker made four peace missions to Cyprus on behalf of the Friends Peace & International Relations Committee (now part of Quaker Peace and Social Witness), writing about the peace settlement there.

While working on the Cyprus issue Baker became a friend of Peter Benenson, the primary founder of Amnesty International (AI). They discussed political, ethical and religious issues. Benenson described Baker as "a partner in the launching of the project" and together they directed the 'Appeal for Amnesty 1961', speaking almost daily on the phone, jointly corresponding with politicians, churches and the media, and gathering a small number of other supporters. Their shared ideas were often written down on napkins in bars, and influenced the 1961 Observer article by Benenson which initially attracted worldwide publicity to the cause. Baker assisted Benenson with both the research and shaping of Benenson's book called persecution ’61, which listed case-studies of current political prisoners. Benenson noted that without Baker's work it would not have been achieved.

It was at Baker's suggestion that the now-famous term 'prisoner of conscience' was adopted and became central to Amnesty International, as did Baker's view that they should support those who were not themselves advocating or condoning violence. Baker subsequently explained his view that AI represented the response of men and women ‘who are tired of the polarized thinking which is the result of the Cold War and similar conflicts but who are deeply concerned with those who are suffering simply because they are suffering.’

Baker became secretary general of AI in 1966. The organisation was in something of a crisis as a result of Benenson's resignation as president, originating in his concerns that AI activities critical of the British Government were being suppressed and his wish to move the organisation headquarters to Switzerland. The position of president was abolished, and Eric Baker was chosen as secretary general. It is reported that Baker faced a formidable task, with morale at its lowest and distrust in the London office running high, and that he had to reestablish AI's stability and sense of purpose. By July 1968, when Martin Ennals was appointed secretary general, the number of AI groups was growing again, and more than a tenth of the prisoners of conscience the group adopted were freed.

Baker also became Chairman of the British section of Amnesty International, Vice Chairman of the International Executive Committee of Amnesty, and Chairman of Amnesty's Sub-committee for the Abolition of Torture.

Baker continued his peace activism in the context of the Religious Society of Friends. He organised sessions on political prisoners and torture at the 1974 Yearly Meeting of the Religious Society of Friends in Britain and at the Triennial Meeting of the Friends World Committee for Consultation in 1976, resulting in agreed statements calling for activism to end the use of torture.

Non-profit organization positions
Preceded by Peter Benenson	Secretary-General of Amnesty International; 1966–1968	Succeeded by Martin Ennals
