= Martin Ennals =

British human rights activist

- Born: 27 July 1927; Walsall, Staffordshire, England
- Died: 5 October 1991 (aged 64); Saskatoon, Saskatchewan, Canada
- Organization: Amnesty International
- Title: Secretary general
- Predecessor: Eric Baker
- Successor: Thomas Hammarberg
- Awards: Gandhi Peace Award

Martin Ennals (27 July 1927 – 5 October 1991) was a British human rights activist. Ennals served as the secretary-general of Amnesty International from 1968 to 1980. He went on to help found the British human rights organisation ARTICLE 19 in 1987 and International Alert in 1985.

During Ennals's tenure as secretary general, Amnesty International was awarded the Nobel Peace Prize, the Erasmus Prize, and the UN Human Rights Award.

== Early life and career ==
Born in 1927 in Walsall, Staffordshire to Arthur Ford Ennals and his wife Jessie Edith Taylor. Ennals was educated at Queen Mary's Grammar School and the London School of Economics, where he received a degree in international relations. Ennals worked for the United Nations Educational, Scientific and Cultural Organisation (UNESCO) from 1951 to 1959. In 1959, Ennals became a founding member of the Anti-Apartheid Movement, and also became secretary general of the National Council for Civil Liberties, a position that he held until 1966, when he became information and publications officer of the Commission for Racial Equality.

Ennals became Secretary General of Amnesty International in 1968. At the time, the organization had seven staff and an annual budget of £17,000. Twelve years later, the staff had grown to 150 with an annual budget of £2 million. Ennals represented an era where Amnesty became a human rights organization of global concern. Amnesty was awarded the Erasmus Prize in 1976, the Nobel Peace Prize in 1977, and the UN Human Rights Award in 1978. Ennals had other people accept the prizes on behalf of Amnesty.

In 1982 Ennals led the founding assembly of HURIDOCS and was its founding President.

In 1986 Ennals became the first secretary general of International Alert.

Ennals had two elder brothers, John and David. David Ennals was a British Labour Party politician who served as Secretary of State for Social Services, while John Ennals was Chairman of the Anti-Apartheid Movement from 1968 to 1976.

== Award ==
The Martin Ennals Award for Human Rights Defenders, created in 1993, is granted annually to someone who has demonstrated an exceptional record of combating human rights violations by courageous means and is in need of protection. The award gives international "protective publicity" to human rights defenders around the world, mainly in their country of origin (a unique characteristic of this award, and very important from a protection point of view), through too much mass media (television, radio and internet). The winner is selected in Geneva, the world center for human rights, by a jury made up of 10 leading international human rights organisations, such as Amnesty International, Human Rights Watch, Frontline, International Commission of Jurists, HURIDOCS, etc.

The Martin Ennals Award is considered the award of the whole human rights movement. It is known as "the Nobel prize for human rights". The Annual Ceremony organised with the City of Geneva is an event with world Internet and TV coverage.

== See also ==
- Human rights defender
