= Gaëtan Mootoo =

Mauritian human rights activist (1952–2018)

West Africa researcher for Amnesty International

Personal details
- Born: Gaëtan Mootoo; 29 September 1952 Curepipe
- Died: 25 May 2018 (aged 65) Paris
- Spouse: Martyne Perrot (1985)
- Education: University of Paris 8 Vincennes-Saint-Denis Science education
- Occupation: West Africa researcher for Amnesty International

Gaëtan Mootoo (29 September 1952 – 25 May 2018) was a Mauritian human rights activist, researcher responsible for West Africa in the Amnesty International organization.

== Biography ==
Coming from a poor family of Curepipe, he became a teacher and engaged in social organizations in his country: Institute for Development and Progress, Fiat movement, Christian Movement for Socialism. In 1978, he studied at the University of Paris 8 Vincennes-Saint-Denis, the subject being French literature and completed his degree in Science education. He then promoted science in Mauritius.

== Work at Amnesty International ==
Having married Martyne Perrot (1985), anthropologist at the CNRS, he was hired by Amnesty International in 1986 and became a researcher for this organization, in charge of West Africa. Until his death, he investigated abuses, injustices, state crimes and human rights abuses (torture, slavery, forced marriages, etc.) in this part of the world, especially in Chad, in Senegal, Guinea, Mali, Mauritania, and spoke out for the oppressed people.

In February 1998, Amnesty published Terror in Casamance, one of the first exclusive investigations carried out by Mootoo. The report detailed the misdeeds of both the Senegalese army and of those fighting for the independence of the southern province of Senegal. “It's a pack of lies and contradictions,” bellowed the president Abdou Diouf. “Amnesty International are a bunch of irresponsible gangsters.”

May 1999, working with two other researchers, Mootoo was behind a report on the Togolese regime headed by Gnassingbé Eyadema which claimed that one year earlier, during the presidential election of June 1998, hundreds of handcuffed opponents had been thrown from airplanes into the sea. Jacques Chirac, a supporter of Gnassingbé Eyadema, condemned the report as an attempt at manipulation, while the authorities in Lomé threatened to take legal action against Amnesty.

According to a Senegalese human rights advocate, Alioune Tine, “Gaëtan had a political side, and his efforts have made a huge contribution to the process of democratic change in Africa.”

== Suicide and Amnesty's secret payout to Mootoo's family ==
Mootoo killed himself at Amnesty International's Paris office on the night of 25 May 2018, calling into question the deterioration of working conditions in Amnesty International. The French authorities have ruled that Mootoo's death was a workplace accident and a review by James Laddie, QC, a specialist in employment law, said that a “serious failure of management” had contributed to his suicide.

An internal inquiry, launched by Amnesty France following a petition from Mootoo's colleagues and published in the autumn of 2018, confirms that the global reorganization of Amnesty International has resulted in a disruption of practices and the marginalisation of field researchers such as Gaetan Mootoo. Documents from the Amnesty France inquiry concluded that the international secretariat, Mootoo's employers, did “not carry out sufficient support work”. The investigators concluded: “Gaëtan Mootoo did not find solutions to adapt to the different changes to the international secretariat, which did not carry out sufficient support work, which would have enabled him to find his place in the new organization. However, he repeatedly asked for help without suitable actions being taken to meet his needs.”.

In another report commissioned by Amnesty International from the London barrister, James Laddie, Laddie wrote, “I am stunned to note that Gaëtan was obliged to face a certain level of hostility at work. Specifically, relations between himself and the deputy director of the French section were poor. According to several witnesses, she did not make any effort at politeness, she encouraged his colleagues to ignore Gaëtan during the working day, and she referred to him in disparaging terms, notably calling him ‘the hobo’.” Laddie's review stated that Mootoo's management failed to find an adequate role for him in the organization and instead preferred to ignore the researcher. "No room was found for Mootoo to perform some kind of mentoring or researcher training role in which his undoubted gifts and experience could be put to good use". "The possibility of such a role was discussed, and <...> Minar Pimple asked Anna Neistat (Senior Director for Research) on several occasions whether a role could be found for Gaëtan within the Research Directorate. It appears that no serious consideration was given to this".

The two reviews of Mootoo's death were followed by a survey by the Konterra group with a team of psychologists. The survey was commissioned by Amnesty's international secretariat, the official employer of Mootoo. The Konterra report stated that Amnesty International had a toxic work culture and that workers frequently cited mental and physical health issues as the direct result of their work for the organization. Elaborating on this the report mentioned that bullying, public humiliation and other abuses of power are common place and routine practice by Amnesty's management. By October 2019 five of the seven members of the senior leadership team at Amnesty's international secretariat left the organization with "generous" redundancy packages. This included Anna Neistat, who was Gaetan Mootoo's senior manager directly implicated in the independent report on Mootoo's death.

After none of the managers responsible of bullying at Amnesty were held accountable a group of workers petitioned for Amnesty's Secretary General Kumi Naidoo to resign. On 5 December 2019 Naidoo resigned from his post of Amnesty's Secretary General citing ill health and appointing Julie Verhaar as an interim Secretary General. In their petition, workers demanded her immediate resignation as well.

In September 2020 The Times reported that Amnesty International paid £800,000 in compensation over the workplace suicide of Mootoo and demanded his family keep the deal secret. The pre-trial agreement between London-based Amnesty's International Secretariat and Motoo's wife was reached on the condition that she keeps the deal secret by signing NDA. This was done particularly to prevent discussing the settlement with the press or on social media. The Times believes that the payout is the largest made by Amnesty in an employment matter and will provide support for Mr Mootoo's widow, Martyne Perrot, and son, Robin. Ms Perrot had filed a legal complaint over Amnesty's conduct but the settlement avoids a court case that could have caused serious damage to its reputation. The arrangement led to criticism on social media, with people asking why an organisation such as Amnesty would condone the use of non-disclosure agreements. Shaista Aziz, co-founder of the feminist advocacy group NGO Safe Space, questioned on Twitter why the “world's leading human rights organisation” was employing such contracts. The source of the money was unknown. Amnesty stated that the payout to Motoo's family "will not be made from donations or membership fees".
