= Ashton Jones =

American Quaker minister

Ashton Bryan Jones (1896–1979) was an American Quaker minister active from the 1930s to 1970s as an advocate of "human brotherhood" during the civil rights movement. Jones was arrested dozens of times throughout the American South for preaching equality between all people. He was a close associate of civil rights leader Martin Luther King Jr.

== Jones' Life ==
During his life as a pastor, Jones had been a pastor for many people, constantly adjusting to new environments to evangelize to other areas. Jones moved around for a total of 750,000 miles, while traveling using the "World Brotherhood" car, a car that was assembled and decorated by Jones to advocate for peace and equality. Although Jones traveled around many miles around the country, he faced many challenges. Because he also preached for Negros and lived among them during his years of traveling, he was constantly harassed and threatened, facing potential threats such as being chased out of towns and being threatened to be shot. Jones also fought for Civil Rights, which led him to be involved in many difficulties. For one, he was frequently arrested, around 40 times, for attending and participating in Civil Rights actions.

In 1967, Jones signed a public statement declaring his intention to refuse to pay income taxes in protest against the U.S. war against Vietnam.
