= Pierre Sané =

Senegalese activist, former secretary-general of Amnesty, academic

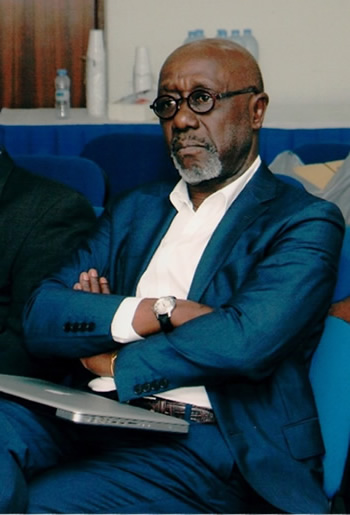

Founder & President of Imagine Africa

Personal details
- Born: 1949 (age 76–77) Dakar, Senegal
- Party: Socialist Party of Senegal

Pierre Sané (born 1949) is the founder president of the Africa Institute. He was UNESCO's Assistant Director-General for Social and Human Sciences from May 2001 to June 2010. He was Secretary General of Amnesty International from October 1992 to April 2001. Sané is one of Progressive International's global cabinet.

== Early life and education ==
Sané was born in Dakar, Senegal. For fifteen years prior to joining Amnesty International, he worked successively as Regional Controller, International Director of Policy and Budget, and Regional Director (West and Central Africa) of the International Development Research Centre in Canada.

He studied for a doctorate in Political Science at Carleton University, Ottawa, Canada, and holds an M.Sc. in Public Administration and Public Policy from the London School of Economics, as well as being a qualified chartered accountant with an MBA from the École Supérieure de Commerce et d'Administration des Entreprises of Bordeaux, France. He has published on development and human rights issues.

== Career ==
Pierre Sané joined Amnesty International in 1988 and served as its Secretary General from October 1992 to 2001. In 1993, Pierre Sané led Amnesty International's delegation at the World Conference on Human Rights and at the UN World Conference on Women in Beijing in 1995. He addressed the United Nations Security Council in September 1997, briefing the members on the theme of human rights and armed conflict. This was followed by a meeting with a former UN Secretary-General, Kofi Annan.

In 1998, he also addressed the Permanent Council of the Organization of American States (Washington), calling for a moratorium on the death penalty in the Americas. That same year, Pierre Sané led the campaign to mark the 50th anniversary of the Universal Declaration of Human Rights. He presided over the Human Rights Defenders Summit in Paris in December 1998.

He joined UNESCO in Paris as Assistant Director General (2001–2010). After retiring from the UN, he taught at the University of Kyoto (Japan) and the University of Seoul (South Korea). He also has directed the IDRC Strategy for Sub-Saharan Africa.

== Founding members ==
He was a founding member of the Pan-African Network for Artistic Freedom, a non-governmental organization, and a trustee and founding member of Frontline (Dublin). He is a member of the board and Chair of the Human Rights Working Group and is the Advisory Committee of UNU-CRIS. He founded the Imagine Africa Institute in 2011, an institute based in Paris and Dakar.

== See also ==
- UNESCO
- Human rights
- African Union

Non-profit organization positions
Preceded by Ian Martin	Secretary-General of Amnesty International; 1992–2001	Succeeded by Irene Khan
