= 51st Munich Security Conference =

Conference

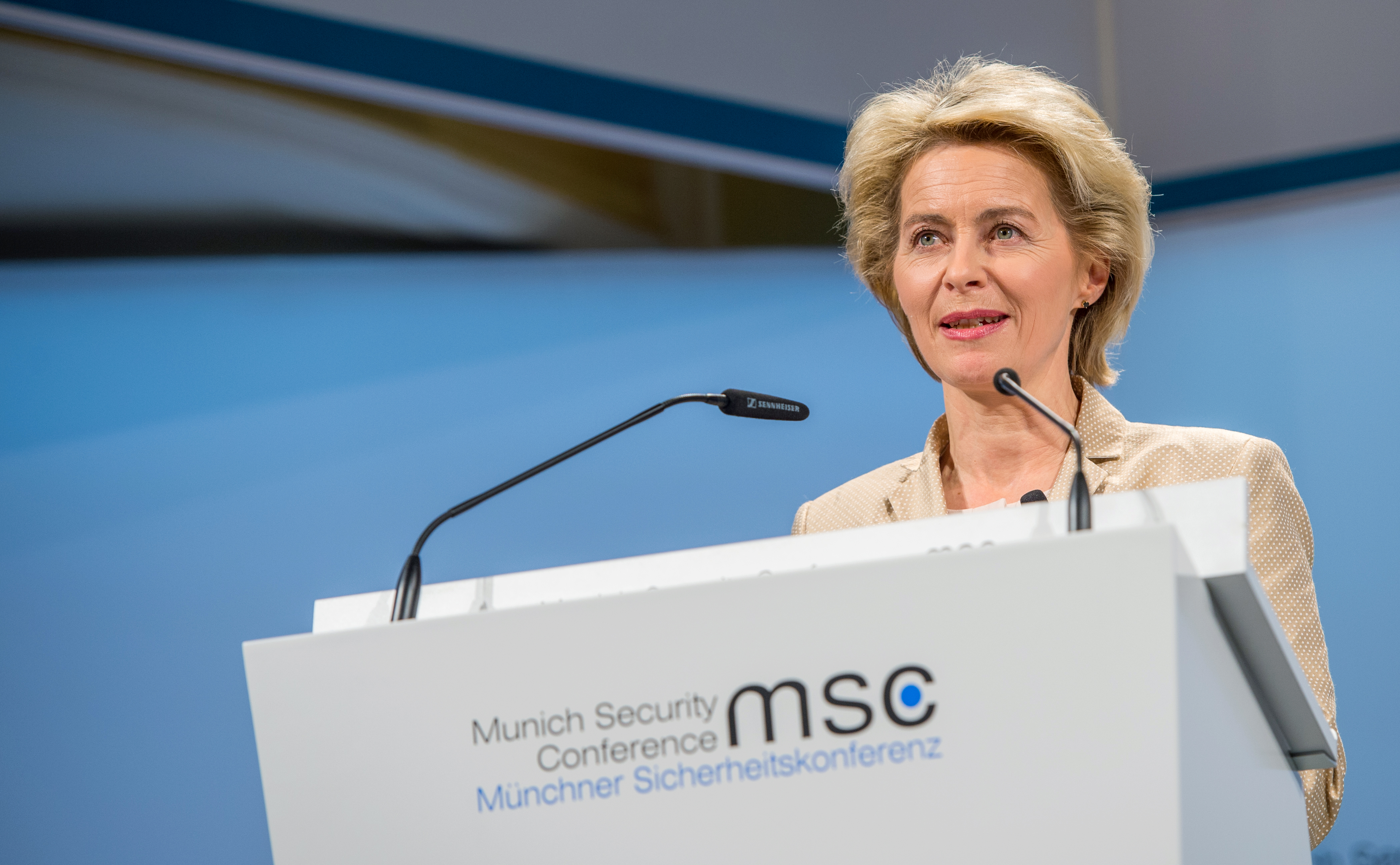
German Minister of Defence Ursula von der Leyen during her opening speech at the 51st MSC

The 51st Munich Security Conference was held from 6 to 8 February 2015. Among the more than 400 participants from nearly 80 countries were 20 heads of state, 70 foreign and defence ministers and 30 CEOs of large companies. The German Defence Minister Ursula von der Leyen delivered the opening speech.

In her speech, she explained Germany's willingness to assume international leadership responsibilities. It consisted of "leadership from the centre", the minister explained, and not one "with Pickelhaube" - which could also imply "fighting together". Based on German history, von der Leyen derived the commitment of her country to defend human rights but added however that the German population was "cautious" on this issue.

== Ukraine ==
In regards to the war in Donbas, the defence minister Ursula von der Leyen accused Russia of leading an "undeclared war". However, she spoke out against a supply of weapons to Ukraine. Also on the opening day, NATO Secretary General Jens Stoltenberg called on Russia to relent in the conflict. "The Cold War is history, and so it should remain," Stoltenberg said. He reaffirmed NATO's dedication to repel every attack, but also warned of the long-term consequences of cutbacks in defence budgets upon security. A meeting between Stoltenberg and Russian Foreign Minister Sergey Lavrov during the conference was described as "frosty".

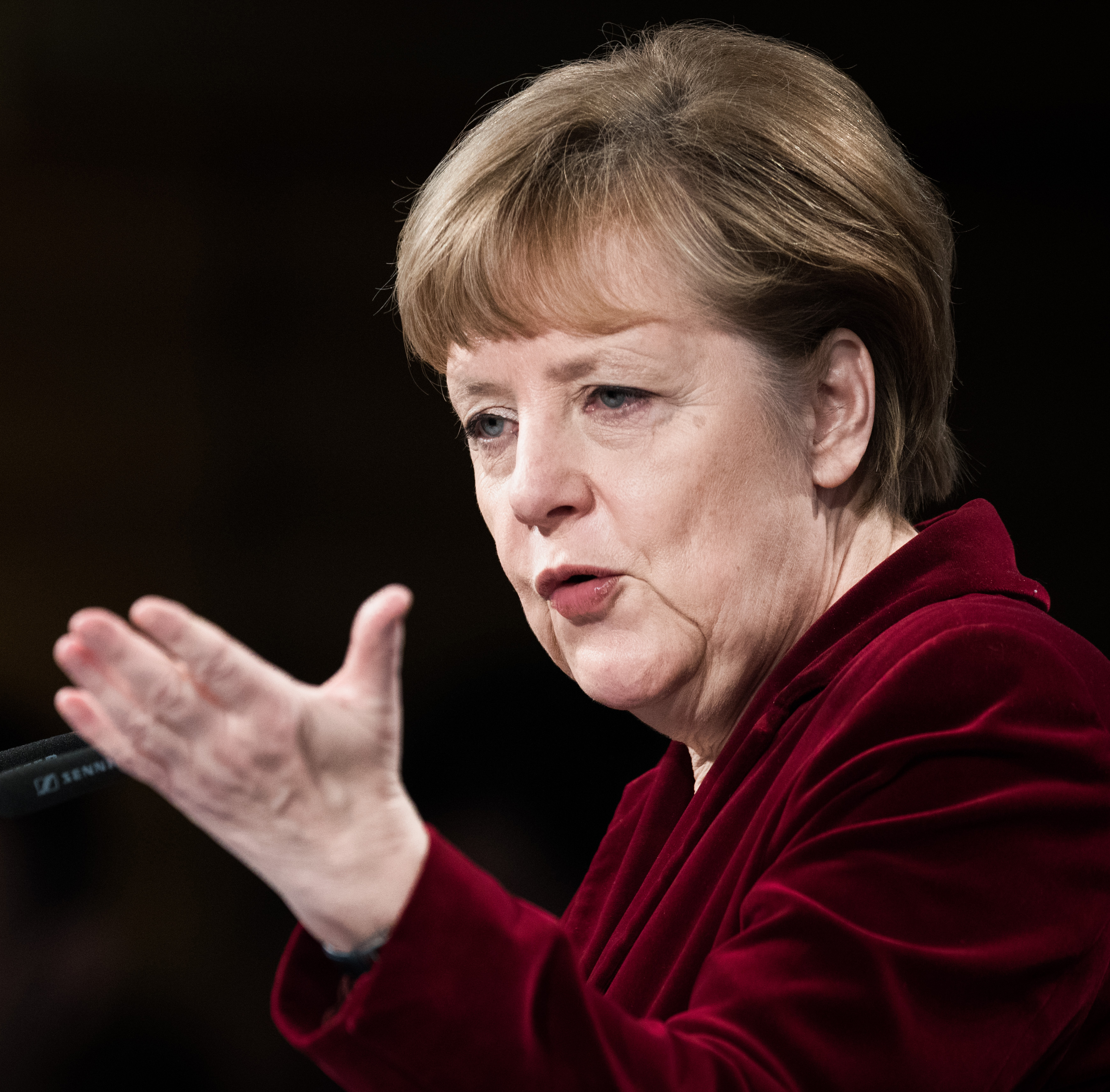
German Chancellor Angela Merkel speaking at 51st MSC

German Chancellor Angela Merkel came to Munich immediately after a joint mediation mission with French President François Hollande in Moscow, negotiating with Russian President Vladimir Putin. In her speech, Merkel rejected the idea of supplying weapons to Ukraine and spoke in favour of a diplomatic solution, and the revitalization of the Minsk Protocol, since the conflict could not be resolved militarily. She pointed out that the Russian policy had been "disillusioning" in the conclusion of the agreement, and also drew on her personal experiences in East Germany during the construction and the fall of the Berlin Wall as an example of a successful non-military solution to a conflict. Responding to repeated calls for supplying weapons to Ukraine, the Chancellor stated: "I am very doubtful." According to Merkel, Putin could not be moved to make more concessions by more weapons and soldiers. After her speech, Merkel held a trilateral meeting with US Vice President Joe Biden and the President of Ukraine Petro Poroshenko.

At the conference, Russian Foreign Minister Lavrov accused the West of deliberately intensifying the Russo-Ukrainian war. Russia itself bears no responsibility for the conflict, Lavrov stated. In his speech he specifically blamed the United States for the massive tensions in the relationship between the West and Russia. Lavrov accused Washington of trying to reach global dominance and of infringing on international agreements in connection with the U.S. missile defence plans in Europe. The Russian Foreign Minister called the current situation a "turning point" in which the West must decide whether they want to "build a secure architecture with, without or against Russia". Lavrov spoke positively about the Franco-German peace efforts.

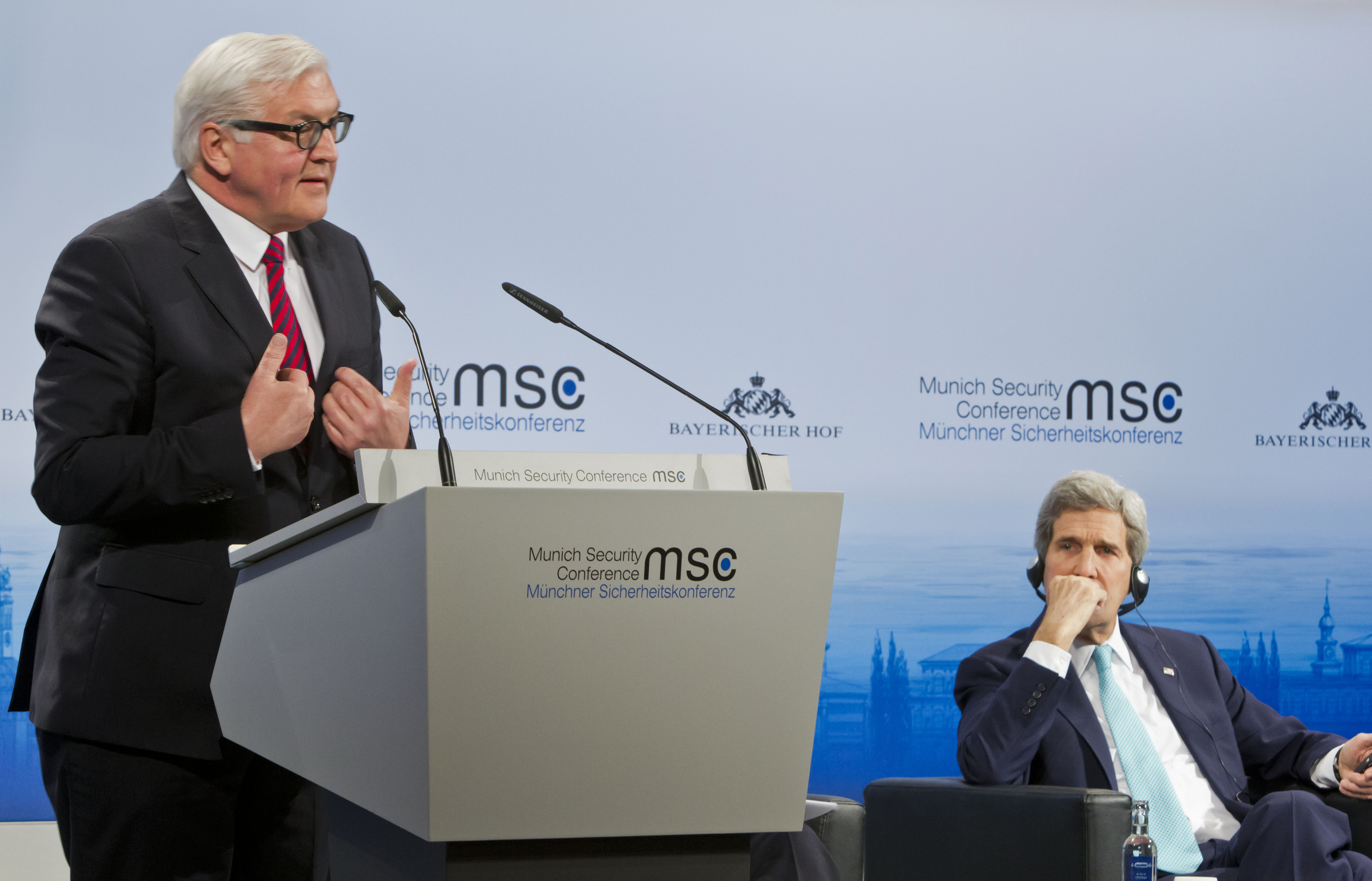
German Minister for Foreign Affairs Frank-Walter Steinmeier (left) and US Secretary of State John Kerry

Lavrov's speech was sharply criticized by German Foreign Minister Frank-Walter Steinmeier. He asked Moscow to show more willingness to compromise and told Lavrov that his speech had not contributed to resolving the conflict. Steinmeier ruled out a quick end to the hostilities. Like Chancellor Merkel before, Steinmeier rejected weapon supplies to Ukraine and described them as "highly risky" and "counterproductive". The German Foreign Minister also stated that the most important task ahead would be containing the conflict in order to gain scope for political solutions. He also emphasized that there could only be lasting security for Europe in cooperation with Russia; at the same time, Steinmeier declared that a positive future for Russia was only possible with Europe, not against Europe. US Secretary of State John Kerry stressed the close cooperation between the United States and Europe and declared that there were no divisions or differences over the Ukraine issue. Kerry also called for a diplomatic solution to the crisis and accused Russian President Putin of "brazen efforts" to destabilize eastern Ukraine.

Philip M. Breedlove, Supreme Commander of NATO in Europe, who was previously skeptical about Western weapon supplies to Ukraine, stated at the conference that in case of a failure of negotiations and sanctions "the possibility of military options should not be excluded". At the same time, General Breedlove ruled out the deployment of ground troops.

== Nuclear negotiations with Iran and the war on terror ==
In connection with negotiations about Iran's nuclear program, the Iranian Foreign Minister Mohammad Javad Zarif stated at the conference that he was opposed to a further extension of the current negotiations, which had a deadline of the end of March 2015. He spoke about the support from the Supreme Leader of Iran, Ali Khamenei, for Tehran's nuclear negotiations, and called for lifting the sanctions against his country. The EU High Representative for the Foreign Affairs and Security Policy, Federica Mogherini, expressed optimism on the progress of negotiations with Iran and spoke in Munich of a "historical opportunity" for resolving this conflict. During the security conference, Zarif and US Secretary of State Kerry came to direct negotiations twice.

Israeli Minister of Strategic Affairs, Yuval Steinitz, warned at the conference of a nuclear arms race in the Middle East, should Iran obtain nuclear weapons.

In the fight against the Islamic State terrorist group (IS), the Israeli minister urged Western countries to provide more military and financial support for Egypt, Jordan, the Kurds and moderate rebel forces in Syria. US Secretary of State Kerry reported in Munich that the international coalition against IS had already flown 2,000 air strikes against the terrorists since August 2012. The strikes had helped to liberate 700 square kilometres from IS control. In connection with the IS burning of the Jordanian pilot Muath al-Kasasbeh alive, Kerry spoke of a "new level of depravity" and announced that the international community should relentlessly tackle terrorist groups like IS and Boko Haram.

== Refugees ==
United Nations High Commissioner for Refugees, António Guterres, warned during a panel discussion about the dangers of the global refugee crises for peace and security. Guterres described the global security situation by saying: "We have no bipolar world, we have no multilateral world, we have a chaotic world." Salil Shetty, Secretary General of Amnesty International, accused the international community of failing to protect human rights and pleaded with the decisions made by the UN Security Council on human rights violations for a limitation of the veto. Shetty criticized the EU, that its 27 member states had taken in only 9,000 refugees from Syria, while the five neighboring countries of Syria needed to cope with 3.8 million war refugees. The Lebanese Prime Minister Tammam Salam described the situation in his country - which with its population of four million had taken 1.5 million refugees from Syria - as catastrophic. German Federal Minister for Economic Cooperation and Development Gerd Müller agreed to supply the Lebanese government with further aid and called on the EU to take in additional refugees. During the panel discussion Müller highlighted the global imbalance between military expenditure in relation to developmental assistance. He received support for his statement from the Vice President of the German Bundestag, Claudia Roth.

The collapse of global order was the subject of another panel discussion, in which Martin Schulz, President of the European Parliament, Kumi Naidoo, international director of Greenpeace, and George Soros, investor and philanthropist, discussed the possibilities of a future new world order. Beforehand, former UN Secretary General Kofi Annan and former Norwegian Prime Minister Gro Harlem Brundtland had presented a proposal to reform the UN Security Council.

== See also ==
- Diplomacy
- International relations
- International security
- Internationalism
- Pirate Security Conference
