= Salil Shetty =

Indian human rights activist (born 1961)

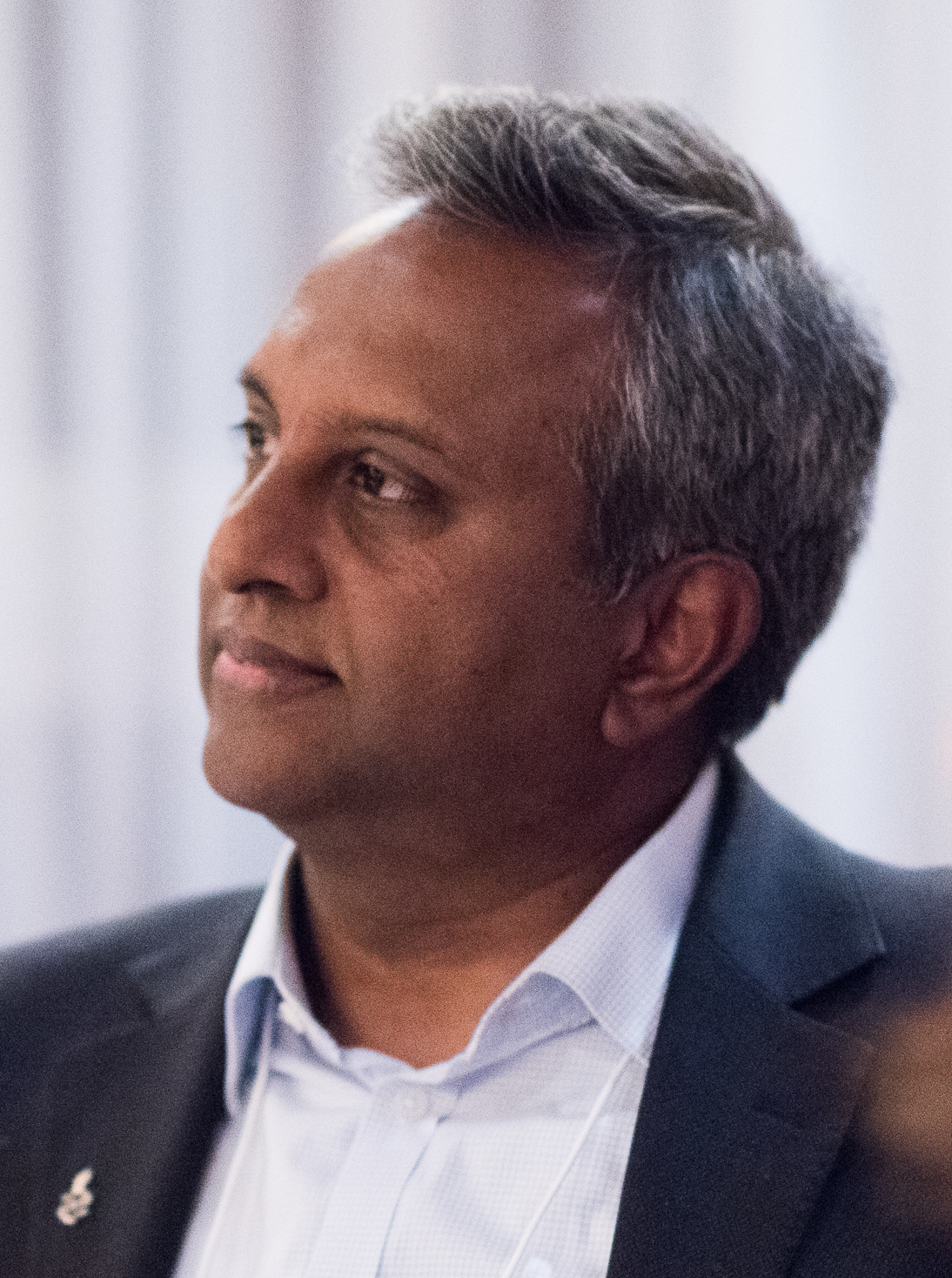
- Shetty in 2017
- Born: 3 February 1961 (age 65); Bangalore, Karnataka, India
- Education: (BCom) St. Joseph's College of Commerce (MBA) IIM Ahmedabad (MSc) London School of Economics
- Shetty's voice recorded July 2014

Salil Shetty (born 3 February 1961) is an Indian human rights activist who was the Secretary General of the human rights organization Amnesty International (2010–2018) till 31 July 2018. Previously, he was the director of the United Nations Millennium Campaign. Before joining the UN, he served as the Chief Executive of ActionAid. Most recently, Shetty had a short stint as the Vice President of Global Programs at the Open Society Foundations.

In recognition of his long-term commitment to Human Rights and his deep understanding of the complexities of human rights issues, Shetty was appointed a Senior Fellow at the Harvard Kennedy School's Carr Center for Human Rights for the academic year 2018–2019.

Shetty is affiliated to Harvard University's Lakshmi Mittal and Family South Asia Institute since 2018. Affiliates contribute to the academic study of South Asia by bringing their expertise on a wide range of issues to Harvard University.

== Early life and education ==
Shetty grew up in Bangalore. His late mother, Hemlatha Shetty, was active in women's groups and his father, V.T. Rajshekar, was active with the Dalit movement. Growing up in India in the tumultuous 1970s, he lived through the 1976 state of emergency which led to human rights being curtailed and an intense level of activism. He did his schooling from St. Joseph's Indian High School, Bangalore. He received a BCom in Advanced Accounting from St. Joseph's College of Commerce in 1981, an MBA in 1983 from the Indian Institute of Management Ahmedabad, and an MSc in Social Policy and Planning from the London School of Economics in 1991 with distinction.

== Early career ==
In 1983, Salil Shetty was hired from IIM-A by Azim Premji and began working for the Indian IT company Wipro.

=== ActionAid ===
Following this, Shetty joined the international NGO ActionAid, rising up to head ActionAid's operations in India and later Kenya in East Africa. Shetty was the first person from the global south to be appointed as the Chief Executive of ActionAid, 1998- 2003. Salil Shetty is credited with not just transforming ActionAid into a Southern-led International organisation, moving its global headquarters from London to Johannesburg in South Africa, but set off an important new trend in global development organisations to become more participatory and bottom up in their approach. The most recent major global organisation to move in this direction is Oxfam which has moved its headquarters to Nairobi, with an African woman CEO.

The move initiated by Salil Shetty enabled ActionAid to work towards giving all its different country programmes a more equal say in how the organisation works. The new structure made ActionAid's commitment to accountability to the people, communities and countries it worked with a reality, and therefore making it more effective in fighting and eradicating poverty. In line with Shetty's commitment to making ActionAid a truly international organisation, during his tenure as Chief Executive regional programmes and policy advocacy offices were established in Bangkok, Harare, Brussels and Washington DC.

=== UN Millennium Campaign ===
Given his significant achievements at ActionAid, Shetty was then appointed the Director of the United Nations Millennium Campaign from 2003 till 2010. The UN Millennium Campaign was established by UN Secretary General Kofi Annan in 2002. The Campaign supported citizens' efforts to hold their governments to account for the achievement of the Millennium Development Goals (MDG's). Under Salil Shetty's leadership the campaign for the MDGs reached over a hundred countries across the globe and the MDGs gained a great deal of traction among decision makers and citizens alike.

In 2005, citizens groups, including NGOs, faith groups, trade unions, supported by the Millennium Campaign, mobilised for the MDGS/‘Make Poverty History’ campaign to increase awareness and pressuring governments into taking actions towards relieving absolute poverty. The campaign focused on the responsibility of developed countries, especially the G8 and European Union. The three focus areas for change were trade, debt and aid. Mass mobilisations were seen in the United Kingdom, Australia, Canada, Norway and other developed countries.

The UN Millennium Campaign, under the leadership of Salil Shetty, also helped aggregate the various national campaigns into The Global Call to Action Against Poverty GCAP). GCAP is an alliance that brings together trade unions, international non-governmental organisations, the women's and youth movements, community and faith groups and others to call for action from world leaders in the global North and South to meet their promises to end poverty and inequality. GCAP added to existing campaigning on poverty by forming diverse, inclusive national platforms that are able to open up civil society space and advocate more effectively than individual organisations would be able to do on their own. It also organised global mass mobilisations that expressed solidarity between the global North and South, allowing tens of millions of ordinary people to make their voices heard.

An innovative mass action launched by the UN Millennium Campaign was the Stand Up initiative. On 16 October 2006, millions of people around the world joined together to 'Stand Up against Poverty' – an effort to remind governments that they must keep their promises to achieve the Millennium Development Goals and eradicate extreme poverty. Stand Up against Poverty, is also officially recognized in the Guinness World Record for the "greatest number of people to stand up for a given cause, at multiple locations, within 24 hours." Stand Up campaigns were held around the world by people of all ages, races and religions. Since 2006, the UN Millennium Campaign organized record breaking Stand Up events annually around the world, to campaign for the MDGs.

== Amnesty International ==
Shetty was appointed as Secretary General of the human rights organization Amnesty International from July 2010. The role involved being chief strategist, advocate and spokesperson for the global Amnesty movement and Chief Executive of the International Secretariat.

During his tenure at Amnesty, Salil Shetty traveled extensively, visiting over 70 countries, meeting grassroots activists, political leaders and members of the media, as well as those on whose behalf Amnesty International campaigns. This has included visits to Egypt in the aftermath of the 2011 uprisings and to Australia to campaign for the rights of indigenous people. He also represented Amnesty International at major meetings at the UN, the World Economic Forum and led the organisation's show of solidarity in Oslo for the imprisoned Nobel Peace Prize Laureate Liu Xiaobo calling on the Chinese authorities to improve their human rights record. He addressed Heads of state representing global civil society in the UNGA High Level Event on SDGs in 2015.

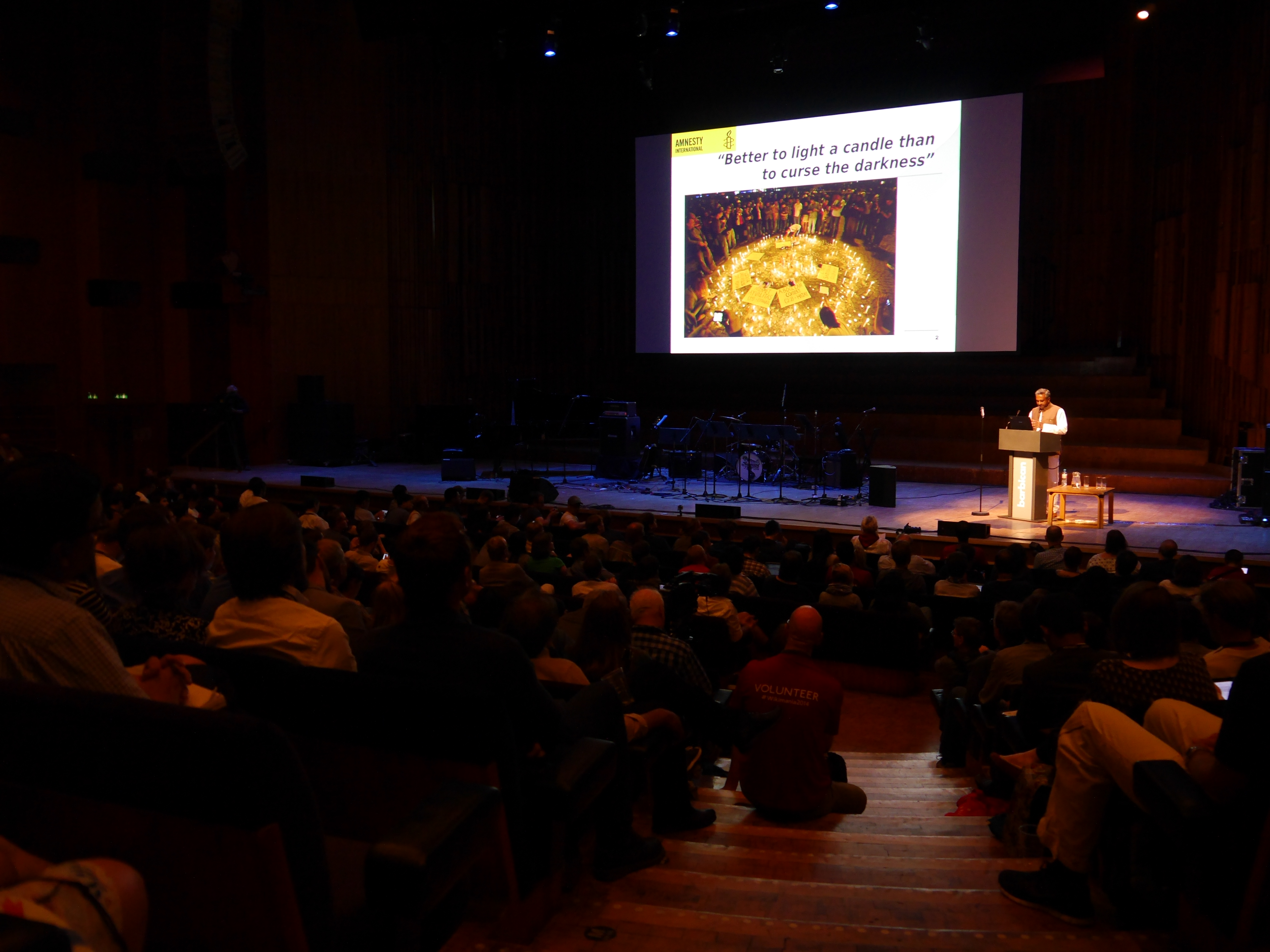
Salil Shetty at the 2014 Wikimania Conference

Shetty was also instrumental in establishing the Secretary General's Global Council, which was established to help raise public support and financial resources to fuel Amnesty International's expansion in Africa, Asia, Latin America, and the Middle East. The goal of the Global Council is to raise financial resources and support for projects connected to Amnesty International's Strategic Goals 2016-2019. These goals seek to address the rising inequality the world is facing, increasing movement of people within and across borders, ongoing crises and conflicts, unlawful actions by states in the name of public order and ending terrorism. Salil Shetty invited Sir Richard Branson to co-Chair the Council which had leading human rights supporters from the world of art, business and philanthropy including Paulo Coelho, Yoko Ono, Tony Fernandes, Hadeel Ibrahim, Bassim Haidar and Krishna Rao.

As Secretary General, Salil Shetty revived Art for Amnesty and the Ambassador of Conscience Award, Amnesty International's highest honour that recognizes remarkable individuals and groups who have promoted and enhanced the cause of human rights by acting on their conscience, confronting injustice and using their talents to inspire others.

During his tenure Amnesty International went from being a northern-centred mostly British organisation to a truly global movement. Amnesty International established a presence in Brazil, Nigeria, Indonesia, India, Mexico and several other major countries in the global south with locally hired staff. This transformation is recognised as an important milestone in the "decolonisation of human rights".

After completing two terms of four years each, Salil Shetty decided to step down as Secretary General in July 2018.

=== Moving Closer to the Ground: Global Transition Programme ===
As Secretary General, Salil Shetty led a major change process to transform Amnesty International from being a predominantly European organisation to a truly global people's movement for human rights. This Global Transition Programme (GTP) to move Amnesty "closer to the ground" represented a significant organizational change for Amnesty: it set up Regional Offices across the globe in 11 locations, hired the vast majority of its staff and leaders from the global south. The change process also focused on strengthening the integration across segments and functions within the organization and strengthening Amnesty's national chapters/sections, particularly in the South.

Amnesty also aimed to increase its supporters and activists in the global South, while diversifying its institutional sources of funding. The change process was aimed to lead to "Amnesty having significantly greater impact by becoming a more global movement" and to result in "acting with greater legitimacy, speed, capacity and relevance as we stand alongside those whose rights are violated". New national offices were set up in India, Brazil, Nigeria, Indonesia, South Africa and Kenya in 2012.

An independent study conducted by the Transnational NGO Initiative housed at Syracuse University on the Global Transition Programme observed that it had resulted not only in an increase in the human rights impact of Amnesty's work but also increased Amnesty's visibility in national and regionally salient media and localities and languages, while its credibility among the general public and other stakeholders was generally thought to have improved. GTP also contributed to Amnesty's supporter ship growth strategy through the increase of supporters in countries such as India, Indonesia, Nigeria & Brazil.

The Global Transition Programme saw a pushback from a small section of staff mainly in Europe who were unhappy about job losses in the Global Secretariat. According to an article published in the Guardian, staff objected to leadership changing employment terms and conditions, including severance.

== Open Society Foundations ==
Salil Shetty was the Vice President of Global Programs for a short period of two years from September 2021 to August 2023.

== Awards ==
On 2 February 2012, Salil Shetty received an honorary degree from University Catholic of Louvain (UCL) on behalf of Amnesty International.

In 2014, Salil Shetty given the 'Public Servant of the Year' award by the prestigious Asian Awards in London. The Asian Awards is the only event that pays tribute to Asian success across all walks of life; emphasising inspiring achievements and highlighting inspirational role models in the fields of business, sport, entertainment, philanthropy and popular arts and culture.

In June 2018, Shetty was awarded the Stardust Achievers Award for Excellence in Humanitarian Service. The Stardust Achievers Awards honours Indian achievers from diverse fields in the UK.

== Boards and other engagements ==
- Steward, World Economic Forum System Initiative on Future of Digital Economy & Society (2016)
- Trustee, International Civil Society Centre, Berlin (2014)
- Advisory Council, American India Foundation, New York, 2010
- Governor, The Institute of Development Studies, Sussex (2005)
- Council Member, The Overseas Development Institute, London (2005)
- Member of the Joint Facilitation Committee of the Civil Society Forum of the World Bank, representing ActionAid (2005)
- Magis Award for Lifetime Achievement alongside cricketer Rahul Dravid, St Joseph's College of Commerce, Bangalore (2021)

== Notes ==
Non-profit organization positions
| Preceded by Irene Khan | Secretary-General of Amnesty International; 2009–2018 | Succeeded by Kumi Naidoo |
