= Un monde sans pauvreté =

Un Monde sans Pauvreté is the Québécois branch of the Canadian Section of Make Poverty History, a national coalition of organizations comprising an international campaign coalition called the Global Call to Action Against Poverty. Working together, these organizations aim to abolish extreme poverty worldwide.

"Abolissons La Pauvreté" is the name of the French-Canadian (Québécois) version of the website called in English Make Poverty History. "Abolissons La Pauvreté: Agissons!" (Abolish Poverty: A Call to Action) is one of the French campaign slogans.

The official statement of the Canadian Section of Make Poverty History provides these related details: "The Make Poverty History campaign is supported by a wide cross-section of charities, trade unions, faith groups, students, academics, literary, artistic and sports leaders. It is part of an 80 country international campaign called the Global Call to Action Against Poverty. Internationally it is supported by hundreds of organizations and by well known individuals such as Desmond Tutu, Brad Pitt, Bono and Bob Geldof. In Canada, prominent Canadians including Stephen Lewis, Sarah McLachlan, Steve Nash, Mary Walsh and John Polanyi have all endorsed the campaign."

The official aims of the Canadian campaign are summed up in "fourteen words" as follows: "More and Better Aid. Trade Justice. Cancel the Debt. End Child Poverty in Canada."

The Canadian campaign's organizers argue that "It's time for world leaders, including our Prime Minister, to live up to their commitments to end poverty and hunger, enable every child to attend school, create decent jobs and reverse the spread of HIV/AIDS."

As a Red Ribbon symbolizes support in the efforts to combat AIDS, the "symbol" of this international anti-poverty campaign is "a simple White Band." The Canadian campaign website and its public service messages appeal to supporters to buy the White Band as a means of fund-raising toward achieving the campaign aims: "By wearing it you'll be part of Make Poverty History, a unique worldwide effort to end extreme poverty - for good."

Among the many celebrities around the world wearing a White Band is Angelina Jolie, a Goodwill Ambassador for the United Nations High Commission for Refugees since 2001.

The television film The Girl in the Café (BBC [UK] and HBO [USA], 2005) dramatizes the human rights, economic, and political issues that these coalitions of anti-poverty organizations are trying to address in relation to a fictionalized meeting of the G8 set on location in Reykjavík, Iceland.
