= Trade justice =

Equitable trade reform campaign

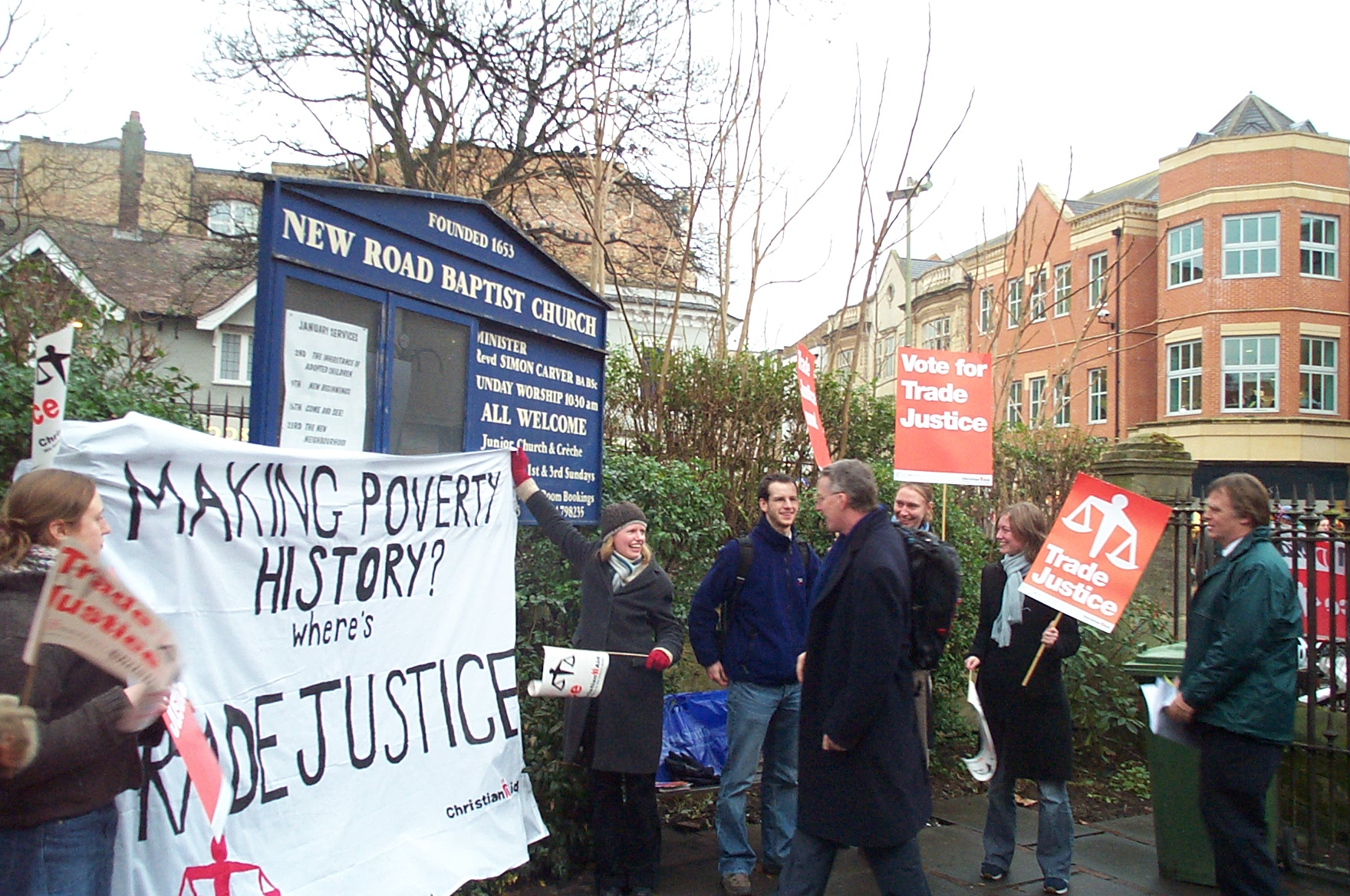
Activists from Christian Aid lobbying for Trade Justice

Trade justice is a campaign by non-governmental organisations, plus efforts by other actors, to change the rules and practices of world trade in order to promote fairness. These organizations include consumer groups, trade unions, faith groups, aid agencies and environmental groups.

The organizations campaigning for trade justice posit this concept in opposition to free trade. Supporters of free trade, typically those in economics, business, lobbying, and the mainstream press, trust in the "invisible hand" of the market to provide on its own for the needs of societies around the world. Fundamental to their beliefs is the value of individual liberty, believed to be the least infringed upon when the market is used to replace most of the centralized government's responsibilities of allocating resources. They tend to support neoliberal policies of privatization, deregulation, and tax cuts, and on the international trade level, policies that loosen restrictions on corporations’ ability to trade and make profits across borders. Rupert argues that because free trade advocates placed themselves on the side of "science," they would label activists as ignorant, protectionist, and selfish. Activists would be designated as "anti-globalization," a term coined by New York Times columnist Thomas Friedman.

Trade justice advocates are not anti-globalization, but are instead against corporate-centered trade liberalization which ignores labor, environmental, and human rights. They argue that truly free trade does not and will never exist, and that governmental policies on trade should be in the public interest, rather than the interest of wealthy entities who they argue try to influence trade negotiation to benefit their individual interests. Rupert argues that they are cautious of the spread of neoliberal policies to the point where the power of private corporations will be enhanced to the point of "business totalitarianism". Advocates of trade justice argue that growing inequity and serious gaps in social justice, and the global export of terrorism, are symptoms of an economic system that permits harms to be exported to other countries, while importing their goods. They point to extinction, deforestation, social unrest, as consequences of globalization, and in particular of an "unfair" globalization. In the past, the responses sought by critics of the international trade system included various penalties on "unfair" goods. This argument generally made little headway against the long-term movement towards free trade; imposition of penalties for "dumping" was sometimes motivated by domestic political reasons such as the United States imposition of steel tariffs in 2001.

Today, the trade justice movement concentrates more on the abolition of agricultural subsidies and dumping, and to a much lesser extent on offsetting penalties on "unfair" goods. Indeed, although there are many who are still critical of free trade in general, there is a trend towards campaigning against what is seen as hypocrisy by developed countries in using protectionism against the poorest countries, especially in agricultural products, while requiring them to leave their own producers without protection.

== Trade justice movement ==
The Trade Justice Movement in the UK was the first formal coalition of groups to use the term "trade justice" (partly because in the UK, "fair trade" usually refers to Fairtrade certification and is a consumer model of change rather than an overtly political movement calling for government action). The term trade justice has been widely adopted internationally by campaign groups, for example by the over 100 national platforms of the Global Call to Action Against Poverty where it is one of the four main demands. In many countries "fair trade" is used as well as or instead of "trade justice".

The global institutions that are most often targeted in trade justice campaigns against the alleged injustices of the current international trade system are the World Trade Organization (WTO), the International Monetary Fund (IMF) and the World Bank (WB). Campaigners also lobby their own governments with the intention of creating pressure on them to prioritise poverty reduction when making international trade rules. In trading blocs such as the European Union (EU), the campaigns seek to influence policy across a number of member state governments.

"Trade Justice" and "Fair Trade" were originally used by those supporting social justice and the alleviation of the intense poverty found in many developing nations. They contrasted "fair trade" with 'unfair' international trade practices. It is associated particularly with labour unions and environmentalists, in their criticism of disparities between the protections for capital versus those for labour and the environment. The use of the term has expanded beyond campaigns to reform current trading practices, and the major institutions such as the World Trade Organization which embody them. Now it has become a movement to allow consumers to choose not to participate in these practices. Fairtrade labelling or "Fairtrade certification" allows consumers to identify goods especially commodities such as coffee, that meet certain agreed standards of fairness.

=== Framing ===
Ayres argues that generating a clear consensus between different groups in the trade justice movement is straightforward for "diagnostic framing"– identifying the problem and its many identifiable negative effects. They can agree that free trade policies have contributed to the rising debt of developing countries, the widening wealth gaps, economic instability, environmental degradation, human rights abuses, and poverty. Organizations have difficulty consolidating a "prognostic framing"– how advocates should go about actually solving the problems they have identified. Some hope to reform the WTO and include rights considerations in trade agreements, while others hope for more extreme measures. When it comes to strategies, some lean more towards collaborating with existing powers through NGOs, while others hope to make change through grassroots organization and protesting.

== Issues ==
Academics such as Thomas Alured Faunce argue that the insertion of a constructive ambiguity such as valuing innovation in bilateral trade agreements (and then according normative and ongoing lobbying power to such textual negotiating truces by formally linking them with non-violation nullification of benefits provisions) may undermine democratic sovereignty with regard to construction of domestic policy, particularly in areas such as the environment and public health. This view is strenuously contested by trade law officials and many domestic policy makers.

"The mostly widely referred to demand of trade justice campaigners is access to the markets of developed countries or rich countries. When developing countries export to developed country markets, they often face tariff barriers that can be as much as four times higher than those encountered by developed countries. Poverty claims that those barriers cost poor countries $100 billion a year – twice as much as they receive in aid."

The term "trade justice" emphasizes that even if the playing field were level, instead of tilted against developing countries, the poorest developing countries in particular would still struggle to gain from trade if forced to trade under free trade terms. This is because of their overwhelming lack of competitiveness – poor countries do not have huge stocks of exports waiting to be shipped to rich countries, instead most small farmers want to be able to sell their goods locally.

=== Subsidies ===
Most trade justice campaigners focus in some way on the agricultural subsidies of rich countries that make it difficult for farmers in poor countries to compete. For example, they argue that the European Union's agricultural export subsidies encourage overproduction of goods such as tomatoes or sugar, which are then sold cheaply or 'dumped' in poor countries. Local farmers cannot sell their goods as cheaply and go out of business.

The campaign points to the treatment of agriculture at the WTO, which has institutionalized these injustices. In the few instances where developing countries have used the complex and expensive WTO process to declare subsidies (e.g. US cotton subsidies) excessive, developed countries ignore these rulings, which the WTO itself does not enforce. Recently rich countries have begun to talk about cutting export subsidies, but they often demand greater access to poor country markets in return.

== The Impact of Trade on the Environment ==
According to the Organization for Economic Co-operation and Development (OECD), there is both a positive and negative impact of trade on the environment. On the one hand, economic growth from trade can negatively affect the environment in two ways. First, economic growth increases pollution due to natural resource extraction. As the world looks to transition towards a more environmentally friendly economy, global demand for lithium-ion batteries – a key component in electric vehicles – is expected to reach 2.2 million tonnes by 2030. The extractivism required to mine lithium leads to air, water, and soil pollution due to the toxic chemicals used during the mining process, and the depletion of local water reserves. Second, trade liberalization can lead to specialization in pollution-intensive sectors if environmental regulations are different across countries (pollution haven hypothesis). Conversely, economic growth stemming from trade increases the capacity of a country to manage the environment more efficiently and stricter environmental regulations in certain countries have a spillover effect that will force suppliers to adapt to environmentally conscious markets. These environmental policies create markets for environmental goods to be exported to countries that follow the same standards.

=== Challenges for Environmental Protection in Trade ===
Environmental justice efforts are a significant component of the trade justice movement. The principle of free trade based on economic opportunity for all ignores the environmental degradation that comes as a result. Moreover, power imbalances within the WTO, the United Nations and other international governing bodies have allowed developed countries to control environmental trade regulations. This has led to disagreements regarding whether environmentalism protects the global South and its resources or is an imperialist tool to stunt the economic and industrial growth of developing nations. In particular, the former argument states that "robust environmental regulation" is needed to protect the "natural resource base upon which the South relies for survival." However, others claim that international governing bodies cannot set environmental policy based on equality rather than equity; these policies cannot overlook the fact that the global North's consumption habits are the primary cause of environmental degradation. Environmental burdens must be distributed proportionately for environmentalism to not be used as a neo-imperial tool. This perspective has been enhanced by controversies of the Summers memo and many instances of improper waste disposal in the Global South based on weak political infrastructures that allow large organizations to avoid strict regulation.

"While Southern elites can insulate themselves to some extent from the consequences of the waste trade by moving into more pristine communities with better access to clean air and water and uncontaminated land, it is the poor who must suffer the consequences of environmental degradation. Far from being a luxury, environmental protection is necessary to preserve the health, safety and well-being of the Southern poor."

Despite a push by the OECD to increase demand for environmental products and technology, thereby complementing trade with environmental policy, examples as recent as fall 2021 show nations disregarding these considerations. A leaked document from the UK's Department for International Trade says that trade negotiators should prioritize economic growth over the environment in trade deals. This document comes after it was found that the UK dropped climate related promises to finalize a trade deal with Australia.

Ultimately, the debate continues as environmentalists prioritize environmental protection over economic growth and governing bodies and organizations stall to implement binding policy. Many researchers and environmental groups demand increased transparency and participation from non-governmental stakeholders in policy adjudication.

=== The Future of Environmental Trade ===
The challenge for the Trade Justice movement, particularly from an environmental perspective, is embedding principles of environmental stewardship that inspires a new generation of trade agreements. Previous free trade deals have favoured investor rights that disregard environmental concerns. Professors from Saint Mary's University in Halifax argue that future treaties must have rules with enforceable commitments and dispute settling bodies, such as those found at the WTO, and not the voluntary actions undertaken in treaties like The Paris Agreement. The authors assert that multilateral forums found in the UN are perceived as places where progressive agendas go to die as they are hindered by opposition or disinterest from powerful states who prioritize their national interests over the common good. A solution is to strengthen the language surrounding environmental regulations in treaties to match those found in the investment rights sections of trade deals.

== See also ==
- Corporate development
- Dumping (pricing policy)
- Economic development
- Fair trade
- International development
- Social development
- Sociocultural evolution
- Trade and development
