= Stand Up and Take Action =

Stand Up and Take Action is the name of an annual global mobilization coordinated by the United Nations Millennium Campaign and the Global Call to Action against Poverty.

== Background ==
In 2000, leaders of 189 countries assembled in New York City to outline a series of targets to address the most serious challenges in the developing world. The MDGs are an eight-point road map with measurable targets and clear deadlines for improving the lives of the world's poorest people. World leaders have agreed to achieve the MDGs by 2015.

== Organizer ==
The Stand Up is organized by the United Nations Millennium Campaign. The United Nations Millennium Campaign is a UNDP campaign unit in response to the Millennium Declaration signed by 189 member states. Established in October, 2002, it aims to increase support to achieve the Millennium Development Goals and seek a coalition of partners for action. The Millennium Campaign targets intergovernmental, government, civil society organizations and media at both global and regional levels.

== Participation ==
The forms of participation vary.

Common ways to make noise for MDG include:

- Public gatherings banging spoons on metal plates to illustrate hunger
- Church groups and temples arranging the bells to be rung at the same time in cities across the country
- Local musicians playing their instruments in innovative locations.

United Nations Millennium Campaign encourages the participants to record the events and inform the Campaign about the details to measure the level of support and increase the political impact.

== History ==
=== 2006 ===
On 15–16 October 2006, 23,542,614 people, in over eighty countries around the world set a new Guinness World Record for the largest number of people to "STAND UP AGAINST POVERTY". In Asia, 18,195,126 people took the pledge for poverty eradication. The Stand Up record attempt was an initiative of the Millennium Campaign in partnership with the Global Call to Action against Poverty (GCAP), set in time for the United Nations International Day for Poverty Eradication on 17 October 2006.

=== 2007 ===
More than 43.7 million people in 127 countries participated in the second Stand Up in 2007.

=== 2008 ===
From October 17–19, more than 116 million people took part in the third Stand Up. The three days of action saw huge concerts in Lagos, Singapore, Togo, Manila and Nairobi. From Pretoria, Harare and Delhi, there were vast campaign marches and mass mobilizations.

Other events included a countrywide caravan rally in Togo focusing on specific MDG goals, hundreds of mosques "standing up" in a statement of solidarity and, in Indonesia, a ‘Stand Up and Take Action’ Rap Contest for community youth groups in Manila.

In Belgium. there was a football event mass campaign while, in Germany, Bianca Jagger presented video messages from members of the World Future Council.

Schools across the world also took part from Malta to Palestinian Authority, where 500,000 pupils organized debates. There were cinema screenings, mass signings, marches, and ant-poverty actions across the globe.

=== 2009 "Stand Up and Take Action against Poverty" campaign ===
173 million people, 2.5% of the world population, around the world took part in the fourth Stand Up. This was a new Guinness World Record. Over 3,000 events were held in more than 120 countries in the fourth year of the “Stand Up, Take Action, End Poverty Now!” campaign over the weekend. At least 100 million people in Asia took part in the campaign, while Africa saw the participation of almost 40 million, the Arab region over 30 million, Europe more than 2 million, Latin America and North America some 200,000 each, and Oceania more than 170,000.

=== 2010 ===
Stand Up 2010 took place on September 17 to 19. The theme is “Make a Noise for the MDGs”. A global day of action will take place on September 18. This is designed to ensure that the support of the MDGs is seen and heard around the world prior to the UN MDG Review Summit taking place in New York City from September 20 to 22.
