= Make Poverty History Emirates =

Make Poverty History-Emirates (MPHE/MPH-Emirates)
- Type: Advocacy Campaign/Anti-Poverty Coalition
- Industry: Non Profit Campaign
- Founded: 15 April 2005
- Headquarters: United Arab Emirates
- Key people: Anish Kattukaran, Founder & National Coordinator; Jaser Faruq, Outreach Coordinator
- Products: White Wrist Band
- Website: www.makepovertyhistory.ae

Make Poverty History-Emirates (MPHE-/MPH-Emirates) was an open coalition of UAE based organizations that worked together to eradicate global poverty and assist in the achievement of the Millennium Development Goals (MDG's) from 2005 until 2009.

The campaign was founded in 2005 by Anish Kattukaran and mobilized tens of thousands people in support of its goals, ran national awareness ad campaigns and advocated for its goals. It operated as the national arm of the Global Call to Action Against Poverty (GCAP), the largest anti-poverty coalition in the world.

== Overview ==
Make Poverty History-Emirates initially slated to be a one-year-long awareness campaign, rapidly grew into a national anti-poverty coalition. The campaign built its initial momentum in schools before expanding outwards. The campaign was founded in April 2005 and was launched as a coalition at an 'Initiation Conference' at the Fairmont Dubai in September 2005.

At the 'Initiation Conference', MPH-Emirates aligned itself to GCAP and its goals, effectively forming its UAE national arm. The coalition extended its mandate to operate until the end of 2007 in line with GCAP's reworked 'Beirut Declaration' (GCAP's Mandate). Make Poverty History-Emirates will study the possibility of extending the campaign beyond 2007 based on the outcomes of GCAP's national assembly in Montevideo, Uruguay in May 2007.

== Demands ==
Make Poverty History-Emirates is committed to:

- Raising awareness on key global issues like Extreme Poverty, Hunger, Disease and Education.
- Mobilizing the public on key global dates in support of these issues.
- Assisting in the achievement of the Millennium Development Goals
- Promoting volunteerism amongst the public of the United Arab Emirates

At a global level the coalition seconds the demands of The Global Call to Action Against Poverty, its parent campaign.

Excerpts from GCAP's Beirut Declaration:

There is great diversity among our group, but we know that we will be more effective when we work together. We do not endeavour to reach absolute agreement on detailed policy, but we want to pressure governments to eradicate poverty, dramatically lessen inequality, and achieve the Millennium Development Goals.

The demands:

- Public accountability, just governance and the fulfillment of human rights
- Trade justice
- A major increase in the quantity and quality of aid and financing for development
- Debt cancellation

== National Campaign Coalitions ==
Make Poverty History-Emirates is the national arm of The Global Call to Action Against Poverty or GCAP. GCAP has national coalitions working in over a hundred countries, a few of which are listed below, for a detailed list please see

- The Global Campaign - Global Call to Action Against Poverty
- 2005: plus d’excuses - France
- Deine Stimme Gegen Armut - Germany
- Hottokenai, Sekai no Mazushisa - Japan
- Make Poverty History - Australia
- Make Poverty History - Canada
- Make Poverty History - Ireland
- Make Poverty History - Emirates (UAE)
- Make Poverty History - United Kingdom
- Make Poverty History - Nigeria
- The ONE Campaign - Singapore
- ONE Campaign - USA
- SANGOCO - South Africa
- Wada Na Todo - India
- Alliance Contre la pauvrete au Mali (GCAP-Mali)
- No More Excuses - Philippines

== See also ==
- Extreme poverty
- Global Call to Action Against Poverty
- Make Poverty History
