= Kumi Naidoo =

South African human rights and climate justice activist (born 1965)

- Naidoo at COP31 (2026)
- Born: 1965 (age 60–61); Durban, South Africa
- Education: University of Oxford
- Occupation: Human rights activist
- Organization: Amnesty International
- Title: Secretary-General of Amnesty International

Kumi Naidoo (born 1965) is a South African human rights and climate justice activist. He is the current president of the Fossil Fuel Non-Proliferation Treaty Initiative, a joint diplomatic and civil society campaign to create a treaty to stop fossil fuel exploration and expansion and phase-out existing production in line with the targets of the Paris Climate Agreement, while supporting a just transition to renewable energy.

He was International Executive Director of Greenpeace International (from 2009 through 2015) and Secretary General of Amnesty International (from 2018 to 2019). Naidoo served as the Secretary-General of CIVICUS, the international alliance for citizen participation, from 1998 to 2008. As a fifteen-year old, he organised students in school boycotts against the apartheid regime and its educational system in South Africa. Naidoo's activism went from neighbourhood organising and community youth work to civil disobedience with mass mobilisations against the white controlled apartheid government. Naidoo is a co-founder of the Helping Hands Youth Organisation. He has written about his activism in this period in his memoirs titled Letters to My Mother: The Making of a Troublemaker. In the book Naidoo recounts the day of his mother's suicide when he was just 15 and how it became a catalyst for his journey into radical action against the Nationalist Party's apartheid regime.

Naidoo served as the Launch Executive Director of Africans Rising for Justice, Peace & Dignity (2016) and he was appointed as the Inaugural Global Ambassador in June 2020.^{[8]} He has also served the Global Call to Action Against Poverty and the Global Call for Climate Action (Tcktcktck.org), which brings together environmental aid, religious and human rights groups, labour unions, scientists and others and has organised mass demonstrations around climate negotiations. Naidoo is a Richard von Weizsäcker Fellow at the Robert Bosch Academy with in-residence stays in 2022 and 2026. He has lectured at Fossil Free University (2019 through 2021). He has served as a Special Advisor to the Green Economy Coalition. Naidoo is an Honorary Fellow at Magdalen College and a Visiting Fellow at Oxford University.

== Early life and activism ==
=== Activism in South Africa ===
Born in Durban, South Africa, Kumi Naidoo became involved in anti-apartheid activities, resulting in his expulsion from high school. As a fifteen-year old, he organised school boycotts against the apartheid educational system in South Africa. In this era, he was involved in neighbourhood organising, community youth work, and mass mobilisations against the apartheid regime. Naidoo was arrested several times and was charged for violating provisions against mass mobilisation, civil disobedience and for violating the state of emergency.

His work made him a target for the Security Police. This led him to having to go underground before he was forced to flee into exile to the United Kingdom until 1990. He suspended his studies at Oxford to return to South Africa in 1990 in order to conduct literacy campaigns after the release of Nelson Mandela from prison and Mandela's decision to run for president of South Africa.

He was later asked to lead the process to formally register the African National Congress (ANC) as a political party. He then served as the official spokesperson of the Independent Electoral Commission (IEC), the overseer of the country's first democratic elections in April 1994. Naidoo was the founding member and executive director of the South African National NGO Coalition. (SANGOCO). Naidoo, like many South African-born Indians, identifies himself as a Black South African. He noted that the completion of his doctorate was absolutely essential given that he was told he was "the first Indian activist" from South Africa to earn a doctorate at Oxford.

=== The exile years ===
During the apartheid period, Naidoo was arrested several times and was charged for violating provisions against mass mobilisation, civil disobedience and for violating the state of emergency.

This led him to having to go underground before finally deciding to go into exile, ending up with time in England and the United States.

During this time Naidoo was a Rhodes scholar at the University of Oxford and he eventually earned a PhD in political sociology.

Naidoo's doctorate was earned in the late 1990s, after he returned to England from South Africa.

After Nelson Mandela's release from prison in 1990, Naidoo returned to South Africa to work on the legalisation of the African National Congress and to lead the adult literacy campaigns and voter education efforts.

== NGO career ==
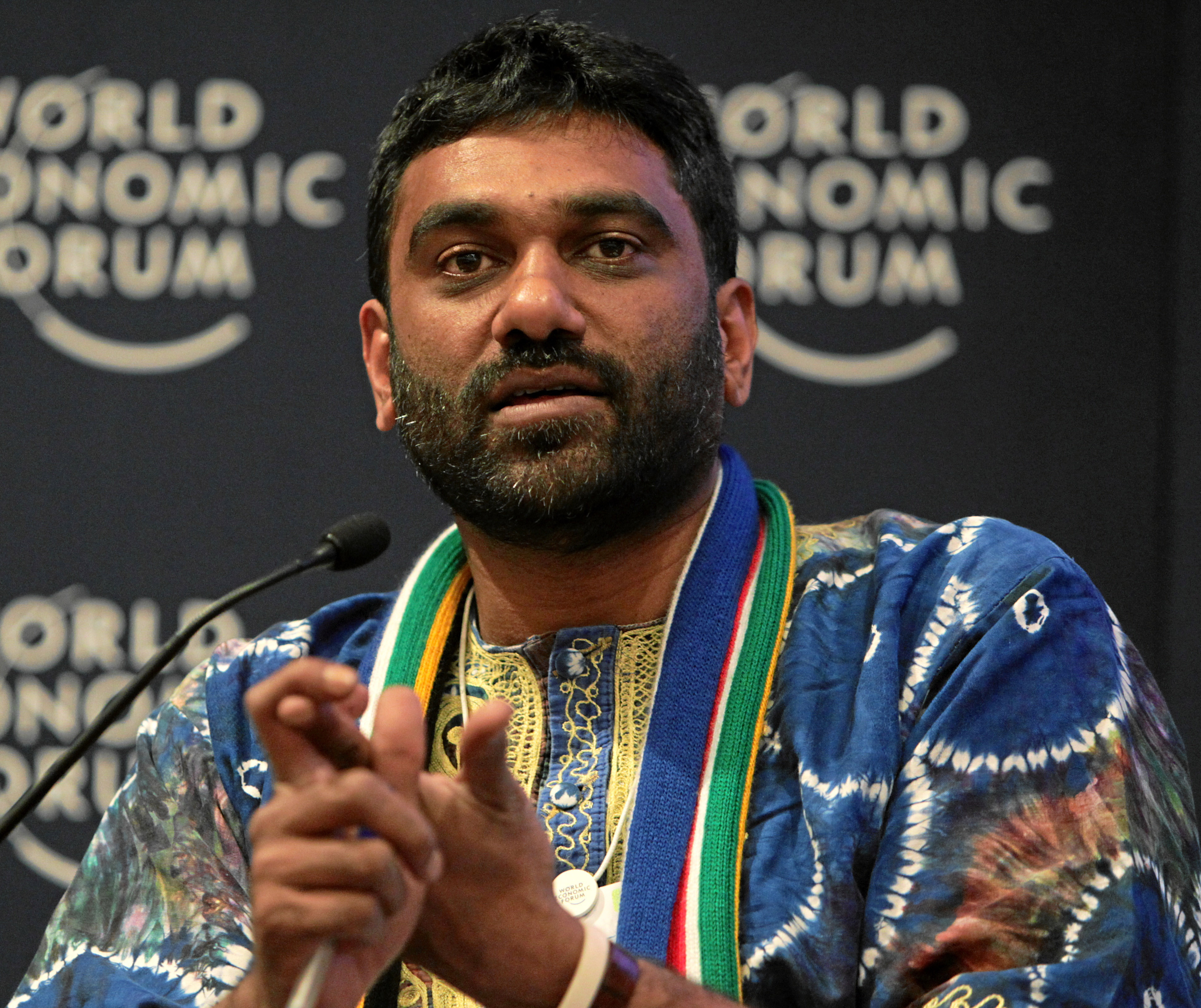
Kumi Naidoo at the World Economic Forum annual meeting in 2011

=== CIVICUS ===
From 1998 to 2008, he was the Secretary General and chief executive officer of the initially Washington-based Civicus: World Alliance for Citizen Participation, which is dedicated to strengthening citizen action and civil society throughout the world.

During this time, Naidoo also served as the founding chairperson of the Global Call to Action Against Poverty.

=== Greenpeace ===
Kumi Naidoo joined Greenpeace in 2009. He had been persuaded by his daughter Naomi to take on the role. Greenpeace's commitment to direct action and civil disobedience was what attracted Naidoo to the organisation. Naidoo saw his role as the executive director of Greenpeace as that of an alliance builder and an agent of change. Importantly, Naidoo saw the intricate connections between environmental justice, women's and human rights as being interconnected, occasionally bringing him much criticism from Western-born environmentalists who tended and tend to see environmentalism as a discrete cause.

Naidoo has been actively involved in acts of peaceful civil-disobedience in the Arctic Ocean region against Shell and Gazprom's plan to drill in the Arctic's melting ice. In August 2012, Naidoo along with a group of Greenpeace volunteers occupied Gazprom's Prirazlomnaya oil platform in the Pechora Sea for 15 hours, for the second time in the Arctic. A year before, in June 2011, Naidoo spent four days in a Greenlandic prison after scaling an oil platform owned by Cairn Energy, as part of Greenpeace's "Go Beyond Oil" campaign. He was deported to Denmark where he spent a short time in Danish custody before being released in Amsterdam, Netherlands.

He has been a vocal critic of the failure of bodies like the World Economic Forum, to go beyond "system recovery", "system protection and maintenance" instead proposing a system re-design. Kumi Naidoo uses the WEF to amplify environmental messages to business leaders and politicians and lobby for green business practices and transformational changes in the energy sector. During the World Economic Forum in 2013, while Kumi Naidoo was rubbing shoulders with the world's wealthiest elites, Greenpeace activists were blocking a Shell gas station just outside the Swiss mountain resort demanding that the oil giant drops its ambitions to drill for oil in the Arctic. Naidoo regularly attends United Nations climate negotiations and advocates for increased ambitions from governments to cap emissions and vigorously move towards an energy sector based on renewables meant to help humanity avoid catastrophic climate change.

In 2015, Naidoo announced that he would be leaving the post of International Executive Director in the middle of his second term. Announcing his departure from the role of IED he said: "When I leave, I am looking forward to taking up an even more important role with Greenpeace: as a volunteer." Naidoo returned to South Africa to focus his work on energy justice. Naidoo's resignation came shortly after it emerged that the organization suffers a budgetary crisis. In 2014 a leaked document indicated that a staffer had lost £3m in donor money on the foreign exchange market by betting mistakenly on a weak euro while Greenpeace's financial department faced a series of other various problems due to mismanagement. The further documentation showed that this was only one example of how the organization was not managing its finances well and neglecting its reputation. It was also revealed that Greenpeace International's program director Pascal Husting was regularly commuting by plane between his home in Luxembourg to the organization's offices in Amsterdam. A letter from 40 Greenpeace Netherlands staff called on Husting to resign. Greenpeace International staff shortly joined their colleagues demanding that Executive Director Kumi Naidoo should resign as well.

=== Amnesty International ===
On 21 December 2017, Amnesty International appointed Kumi Naidoo as its next Secretary-General. In August 2018 Naidoo succeed Salil Shetty, who served two terms in Amnesty International as the Secretary-General from 2010. The Secretary General is the leader and main spokesperson for Amnesty International and the Chief Executive of its International Secretariat. Naidoo started his role at Amnesty with an opening session from Africa.

In 2019 Amnesty International admitted to a hole in its budget of about £17m in donor money to the end of 2020. In order to deal with the budgetary crisis Naidoo announced to staff that the organization's headquarters would cut almost 100 jobs as a part of urgent restructuring. Unite the Union, the UK's biggest trade union, said the redundancies were a direct result of "overspending by the organisation's senior leadership team" and have occurred "despite an increase in income".

The crisis at Amnesty International became public in 2018 when Gaëtan Mootoo, 65, a researcher of three decades, died by suicide at Amnesty's Paris office, leaving a note blaming work pressures and a lack of support from management. A review found Mootoo's pleas for help had been ignored. According to Mootoo's former collaborator, Salvatore Saguès, "Gaëtan's case is merely the tip of the iceberg at Amnesty. A huge amount of suffering is caused to employees. Since the days of Salil Shetty, when top management were being paid fabulous salaries, Amnesty has become a multinational where the staff are seen as dispensable. Human resources management is a disaster and nobody is prepared to stand up and be counted. The level of impunity granted to Amnesty's bosses is simply unacceptable." After none of Amnesty's managers were held accountable for the poor working conditions and systematic misspending by Amnesty international secretariat, a group of workers petitioned for Naidoo's resignation. On 5 December 2019 Naidoo resigned from Amnesty International citing ill health. Naidoo said, "Now more than ever, the organisation needs a secretary general who is fighting fit and can see through its mandate with vitality that this role, this institution, and the mission of universal human rights deserve.".

=== Later work ===
In May 2016, Naidoo became the Founding Chair of Africans Rising, a Pan-African movement of people and organisations, working for justice, peace and dignity. The organization play a critical role on the continent pushing governments, business, and even established global and national NGOs to focus on challenges Africans deem critical, including demands for a fair global trading system, concrete action to address the effects of climate change and the creation and strengthening of a representative coalition to protect our natural resources and the environment. Naidoo continues to serve Africans Rising in a non-executive role capacity with the official title of Global Ambassador.

In July 2021, Kumi Naidoo was awarded the prestigious Richard von Weizsäcker Fellow at the Robert Bosch Academy, in Berlin. Naidoo used the time at the Robert Bosch Academy to develop his work on 'artivism' and continues his collaboration with Icelandic–Danish artist, Olafur Eliasson. Together, they presented a film at the United Nations Climate Change Conference (Cop26) in Glasgow, on how the worlds of art and activism can help each other curb the climate crisis. Concurrently with the period spent in Berlin at the Robert Bosch Academy, Naidoo hosted a new podcast for the Green Economy Coalition, 'that tackles some of the biggest issues of our time.' Titled Power, People & Planet with Kumi Naidoo, the first series included frank conversations with some of biggest names in modern thinking and science. A second season of Power, People & Planet has been announced that will look at the future of activism.

In November 2022, Naidoo released the first instalment of his memoirs. Titled Letters to My Mother: The Making of a Troublemaker the book tells how his mother's suicide when he was just 15 years old acted as a catalyst for his journey into radical action against the apartheid regime. Letters to My Mother: The Making of a Troublemaker is Naidoo's second book. His first, titled Boiling Point: Can Citizen Action Save the World?, looked at the urgency of the climate crisis and Naidoo's reflections on how we need to unite as humanity to face this challenge.

His roles as of December 2022 include:

- Professor of Practice, Thunderbird School of Global Management at Arizona State University
- Senior Advisor for the Community Arts Network (CAN)
- Special Advisor to the Green Economy Coalition
- Honorary Fellow, Magdalen College and a Visiting Fellow, Oxford University

== Voluntary activism ==
"It is obvious that too many corporations and governments do not listen and put power and profit over people, ignoring what is in the best interest of humanity. It is becoming increasingly difficult to get their attention – but one thing that we know that works is civil disobedience and peaceful protest. Every act of rebellion – no matter how seemingly insignificant – adds up."

— Naidoo, 2009.

Naidoo's voluntary roles include:

- Global Leadership Council Member; Sanitation and Water for All
- Member of the Advisory Council; Transparency International
- Global Ambassador; Africans Rising for Justice, Peace and Dignity

His previous voluntary roles include:

- Board Chair; Global Call to Action Against Poverty
- He has served The Global Call for Climate Action (Tcktcktck.org), which brings together environmental aid, religious and human rights groups, labour unions, scientists and others and has organised mass demonstrations around climate negotiations.
- Between 2015 and 2018, Naidoo served in a voluntary role the Launch Director of Africans Rising for Justice, Peace & Dignity
- Member of the Leadership Council of EarthRights International

Member of the Board of the Association for Women's Rights in Development (AWID)

== Honours and awards ==
Naidoo has been awarded Honorary Doctorates by:

- The University of South Australia (2019)
- University of Johannesburg in 2019
- Durban University of Technology in 2017
- Nelson Mandela University in 2012
- The James Lawson Award for peaceful activism in (2014)
- Kumi was selected as one of the 21 ICONS South Africa: Honouring the legacy of Nelson Mandela (2013)
