= Non-tariff barriers to trade =

Other types of trade barriers

Non-tariff barriers to trade (NTBs; also called non-tariff measures, NTMs) are trade barriers that restrict imports or exports of goods or services through measures other than the imposition of tariffs. Such barriers are subject to controversy and debate, as they may comply with international rules on trade yet serve protectionist purposes. Sometimes, uniformly applied rules of trade may be more burdensome to some countries than others, e.g. for countries with developing economies.

The Southern African Development Community (SADC) defines a non-tariff barrier as "any obstacle to international trade that is not an import or export duty. They may take the form of import quotas, subsidies, customs delays, technical barriers, or other systems preventing or impeding trade". According to the World Trade Organization, non-tariff barriers to trade include import licensing, rules for valuation of goods at customs, pre-shipment inspections, rules of origin ('made in'), and trade prepared investment measures. A 2019 UNCTAD report concluded that trade costs associated with non-tariff measures were more than double those of traditional tariffs.

== Today ==
With the exception of export subsidies and quotas, NTBs are most similar to the tariffs. Tariffs for goods production were reduced during the eight rounds of negotiations in the WTO and the General Agreement on Tariffs and Trade (GATT). After lowering of tariffs, the principle of protectionism demanded the introduction of new NTBs such as technical barriers to trade (TBT). According to statements made at United Nations Conference on Trade and Development (UNCTAD, 2005), the use of NTBs, based on the amount and control of price levels has decreased significantly from 45% in 1994 to 15% in 2004, while use of other NTBs increased from 55% in 1994 to 85% in 2004.

Increasing consumer demand for safe and environmentally friendly products also have had their impact on increasing popularity of TBT. Many NTBs are governed by WTO agreements, which originated in the Uruguay Round (the TBT Agreement, SPS Measures Agreement, the Agreement on Textiles and Clothing), as well as GATT articles. NTBs in the field of professional services have become as important as in the field of trade in goods.

Most of the NTB can be defined as protectionist measures, unless they are related to difficulties in the market, such as externalities and information asymmetries between consumers and producers of goods. An example of this is safety standards and labeling requirements.

== Types ==
NTB policies can be categorized as protectionist, assistance, or non-protectionist.

Policy	Purpose	Examples	Potential consequences
Protectionist	To help domestic firms and enterprises at the expense of other countries.	Import quotas; local content requirements; public procurement practices; anti-dumping laws;	Challenges levied at World Trade Organization, Free-trade area dispute resolution, and other trade forums
Assistance	To help domestic firms and enterprises, but not at the expense of other countries.	Domestic subsidies; industry bailouts.	Adversely affected countries may respond to protect themselves (i.e., imposing countervailing duties and subsidies).
Non-protectionist	To protect the health and safety of people, animals, and plants; to protect or improve the environment.	Licensing, packaging, and labeling requirements; food sanitation rules; food, plant and animal inspections; import bans based on objectionable harvesting or fishing methods.	Limited formal consequences lead to efforts to establish common standards or mutual recognition of different standards.

There are several different variants of this classification of non-tariff barriers. Some scholars divide them between internal taxes, administrative barriers, health and sanitary regulations and government procurement policies. Others divide them into more categories such as specific limitations on trade, customs and administrative entry procedures, standards, government participation in trade, charges on import, and other categories.

The first category includes methods to directly restrict imports for protection of certain sectors of national industries: licensing and allocation of import quotas, antidumping and countervailing duties, import deposits, so-called voluntary export restraints, countervailing duties, the system of minimum import prices, etc. The assistance category methods are not directly aimed at restricting foreign trade and more related to the administrative bureaucracy, whose actions, however, restrict trade. Examples include customs procedures, technical standards and norms, sanitary and veterinary standards, requirements for labeling and packaging, bottling, etc. The third category consists of methods that are not directly aimed at restricting the import or promoting the export, but the effects of which often lead to this result.

== Examples of common NTBs ==
=== Administrative and bureaucratic delays at the border ===
Administrative and bureaucratic delays at the border increase uncertainty and the cost of maintaining inventory. For example, even though Turkey is in a (partial) customs union with the EU, transport of Turkish goods to the European Union is subject to extensive administrative overheads that Turkey estimates costs the Turkish economy three billion euros per year.

=== Censorship ===
Testifying before the United States Senate Committee on Finance, Subcommittee on International Trade, Customs, and Global Competitiveness on "censorship as a non-tariff barrier" in 2020, Richard Gere stated that economic interest compel studios to avoid social and political issues Hollywood once addressed, "Imagine Marty Scorsese's Kundun, about the life of the Dalai Lama, or my own film Red Corner, which is highly critical of the Chinese legal system. Imagine them being made today. It wouldn't happen."

=== Embargoes ===
Embargoes are outright prohibition of trade in certain commodities. Embargoes, or the less extreme restriction in the form of quotas, may be imposed on imports or exports with respect to certain goods supplied to or from specific countries. In the most extreme form, embargoes may be applied to all goods shipped or from certain countries. Embargo may be imposed for biosecurity or political reasons, see economic sanctions and international sanctions. Embargoes are generally considered legal barriers to trade, not to be confused with blockades, which are often considered to be acts of war.

=== Foreign exchange restrictions and foreign exchange controls ===
Foreign exchange restrictions and foreign exchange controls occupy an important place among the non-tariff regulatory instruments of foreign economic activity. Foreign exchange restrictions constitute the management of transactions between national and foreign operators, either by limiting the supply of foreign currency (to restrict imports) or by state manipulation of exchange rates (to boost exports and limit imports).

=== Import deposits ===
Another example of foreign trade regulation is import deposits. Under this restriction, an importer must pay the recipient country's central bank or another bank (e.g. an import/export bank) a non-interest earning deposit for a specified period of time, in an amount equal to all or part of the cost of the imported goods.

=== Administrative regulation of capital movements ===
At the national level, administrative regulation of capital movements between states may be carried out by multilateral trade rules or more commonly, within a framework of bilateral agreements. Bilateral trade agreements include a clear definition of the legal regime and procedures for the admission of investments and investors. It is determined by mode (fair and equitable, national, 'most favoured nation'), order of nationalization and compensation, transfer profits and capital repatriation and dispute resolution.

=== Licenses ===
The most common instruments of direct regulation of imports (and sometimes export) are licenses and quotas. Almost all industrialized countries apply these non-tariff methods. The license system requires that a state (through a specially authorized office) issues permits for foreign trade transactions of import and export commodities included in the lists of licensed merchandises. Product licensing can take many forms and procedures. The main types of licenses are general license that permits unrestricted importation or exportation of goods included in the lists for a certain period of time; and one-time license for a certain product importer (exporter) to import (or export). One-time license indicates a quantity of goods, its cost, its country of origin (or destination), and in some cases also customs point through which import (or export) of goods should be carried out. The use of licensing systems as an instrument for foreign trade regulation is based on a number of international level standards agreements. In particular, these agreements include some provisions of the General Agreement on Tariffs and Trade (GATT) and World Trade Organization (WTO) such as the WTO Agreement on Import Licensing Procedures.

=== Localization requirement ===
An importing country may require the prospective exporter to include a degree of local participation in the product or service. Options include a designated importer, a joint-venture company with majority local control, requirement for complete local manufacture which may imply transfer of intellectual property. The WTO has not reached a conclusion on the legitimacy of these measures.

=== Standards ===
Standards take a special place among non-tariff barriers. Countries usually impose standards on classification, labelling and testing of products to ensure that domestic products meet domestic standards, but also to restrict sales of products of foreign manufacture unless they meet or exceed these same standards. These standards are sometimes entered to protect the safety and health of local populations and the natural environment. Standards which are ostensibly enacted for health and safety reasons can be used by states for trade protectionist and political purposes.

Standards and other regulatory barriers impose different distributional consequences than tariffs. Tariffs alter marginal costs, and rise with the volume of goods traded, whereas a testing, registration, or labelling requirement impose fixed costs. Political scientists have argued that this makes regulatory barriers attractive to governments seeking protection that is less visible than tariffs, and that they divide exporters by size. Because fixed compliance costs can force small and marginal exporters out of a market while leaving large multinational firms relatively unaffected, regulatory barriers can be used to shift profits toward multinationals with local affiliates. This logic is documented to be explain support stricter regulation among large firms in the US toy industry after the Consumer Product Safety Improvement Act and among large chemical producers under the European Union's REACH regulation.

=== Quotas ===
Licensing of foreign trade is closely related to quantitative restrictions – quotas – on imports and exports of certain goods. A quota is a limitation in value or in physical terms, imposed on import and/or export of certain goods for a certain period of time. This category includes global quotas with respect to specific countries, seasonal quotas, and so-called "voluntary export restraints". Quantitative controls on foreign trade transactions are carried out through one-time license.

Quantitative restrictions on imports and exports are direct administrative forms of government regulation of foreign trade. Licenses and quotas limit the independence of enterprises with regard to entering foreign markets, narrowing the range of countries in which firms can conduct trade for certain commodities. They regulate the range and number of goods permitted for import and export.

This type of trade barrier normally leads to increased costs and limited selection of goods for consumers and higher import prices for companies. Import quotas can be unilateral, levied by the country without negotiations with exporting country; or bilateral or multilateral, when they are imposed after negotiations and agreements.

An export quota is a limit on the amount of goods that can be exported from a country. There are different reasons for imposing export quotas from a country. These reasons include guaranteeing of the supply of the products that are in shortage in the domestic market, manipulation of the prices on the international level, and the control of goods strategically important for the country. In some cases, the importing countries request exporting countries to impose voluntary export restraints.

==== Agreement on a "voluntary" export restraint ====
Voluntary export restrictions and the establishment of import minimum prices may be imposed by leading Western nations upon exporters that are weaker in an economic or political sense. These types of restrictions are enforced at the border of the exporting country instead of the importing country.

An agreement on "voluntary" export restraints is imposed by the exporter under the threat of sanctions to limit the export of certain goods to the importing country. Similarly, the establishment of minimum import prices should be strictly observed by the exporting firms in contracts with the importers of the country that has set such prices. In the case of reduction of export prices below the minimum level, the importing country imposes anti-dumping duty, which could lead to withdrawal from the market. "Voluntary" export agreements affect trade in textiles, footwear, dairy products, consumer electronics, and machine tools.

Problems arise when the quotas are distributed between countries because it is necessary to ensure that products from one country are not diverted in violation of quotas set out in the second country. Import quotas are not necessarily designed to protect domestic producers. For example, Japan maintains quotas on many agricultural products it does not produce. Quotas on imports are used as leverage when negotiating the sales of Japanese exports, as well as avoiding excessive dependence on any other country with respect to necessary food, the supplies of which could decrease in case of bad weather or political conditions.

Export quotas can be set in order to provide domestic consumers with sufficient stocks of goods at low prices, to prevent the depletion of natural resources, as well as to increase export prices by restricting supply to foreign markets. Such restrictions allow producing countries to use quotas for such commodities as coffee and oil; as the result, prices for these products increased in importing countries.

A quota can be a tariff rate quota, global quota, discriminating quota, or export quota.

== Scarcity of information ==
The scarcity of information on non-tariff barriers is a major problem to the competitiveness of developing countries. As a result, the International Trade Centre conducted national surveys and began publishing a series of technical papers on non-tariff barriers faced by developing countries. In 2015, it launched the NTM Business Surveys website listing non-tariff barriers from company perspectives.

== See also ==
- Arms embargo
- Arms Export Control Act (United States)
- Economic sanctions
- Non-violation nullification of benefits
- Trade Facilitation and Development
