= Constructive ambiguity =

Deliberate use of ambiguous language to advance a political purpose

Constructive ambiguity is a term generally credited to Henry Kissinger, said to be the foremost exponent of the negotiating tactic it designates. It refers to the deliberate use of ambiguous language on a sensitive issue in order to advance some political purpose. Constructive ambiguity is often disparaged as fudging. It might be employed in a negotiation, both to disguise an inability to resolve a contentious issue on which the parties remain far apart and to do so in a manner that enables each to claim obtaining some concession on it.

It warrants further hopes that the ensuing postponement of resolution on this particular point, in a way that causes neither side excessive discomfort, will enable them to make real progress on other matters. If this progress takes place, the unresolved question might be revisited at a later date, if not voided altogether by the passage of time. On the other hand, since ambiguity in agreements can generate subsequent controversy, the likelihood of its employment proving constructive in comparison to further attempts to negotiate the point in question in clear terms is a question best left for historians.

== Examples of constructive ambiguities in diplomacy ==
=== UN Security Council's Resolution 242 ===
The UN Security Council agreed on the text of its Resolution 242, after the crushing defeat that Israel inflicted on joint Arab forces during the Six-Day War in 1967. As a result of bargaining between the powers sitting in the Security Council, the resolution reflected the deeply polarized political opinion. The provision of the resolution which prompted different and incompatible interpretations was the one immediately following the preamble of the text, reading: "establishment of just and lasting peace in the Middle East should include the application of both the following principles:

- withdrawal of Israeli armed forces from territories occupied in recent conflict;
- termination of all claims or states of belligerency and respect for…territorial integrity…of every State in the area and their right to live in peace within secure and recognized boundaries."

The use of an unnatural English construction "territories occupied in recent conflict" without the expected definite article, "the", made it possible to question whether Israel was asked to withdraw from all the territories occupied in the recent conflict, or to withdraw from some, but not all, such territories. Notably, the French translation of the document, unlike the English original, used the definite article, demanding the "retrait des forces armées israéliennes des territoires occupés lors du récent conflit". Thus the French version, which together with the English version was an official UN version of the document, suggested that Israel must withdraw from all territories that it occupied during the Six-Day War.

Naturally, the French interpretation suited the interests of Arab countries, which made numerous attempts to prove its validity. By contrast, Israel opposed such an interpretation, and the sponsor of the resolution, Lord Caradon, appears to have had no intention of inserting the definite article into its text. Caradon additionally emphasized the additional and clarifying light that the second part of the first provision shed on its first part, and insisted that it must be given uppermost consideration. According to him, the boundary that existed before the Six-Day War did not satisfy the right of Israel to live within secure and recognised boundaries. Consequently, under this interpretation, Israel did not have to withdraw to its pre–Six-Day War borders.

=== The Shanghai Communiqué ===
The Shanghai Communiqué was issued by the United States of America and the People's Republic of China on 27 February 1972, during the US President Richard Nixon's visit to China. Henry Kissinger acted as the principal US negotiator in this matter. The document contained an ambiguous provision inserted by the United States: "The United States acknowledges that all Chinese on either side of the Taiwan Strait maintain there is but one China and that Taiwan is a province of China." This provision lent itself to interpretation as the very first expression of American support for the one-China policy, calling for a reintegration of Taiwan into the PRC. But that is not what it meant in its original context.

The fact acknowledged by the US "that the PRC and Taiwan agree that there is "but one China" does not imply any sort of agreement on internal arrangements for the "one China." On the contrary, for as long as the Taiwan issue has been posed, Chinese governments on either side of the Taiwan Strait have been unable to agree on a formula for their reunification, let alone to have it supported by the US government. Nevertheless, its official endorsement of the term “one China” helped the US to find a proper balance between its relations with the PRC and its relations with Taiwan, without jeopardizing either. Its use reflected a negotiated instance of constructive ambiguity that reduced the immediate risk of open conflict.

=== 6-Point Agreement ===
In the wake of the Yom Kippur War between Israel and Egypt, both negotiators and belligerents faced the issue of the status of the Egyptian Third Army, surrounded by the Israeli Defense Force on the eastern side of Suez. Almost no progress was achieved in the first phase of peace talks held in October. While the talks continued in Washington in November, the UN Security Council issued Resolution 340, which demanded that the Israeli Force withdraw to the lines occupied on October 22, 1973, at 1650 GMT, causing an end to the encirclement of the Egyptian Third Army. However, Israel refused to comply with Resolution 340. Thereafter negotiations fortunately continued and resulted in a so-called "6-Point Agreement", signed on November 11 at Kilometer 101 of the Cairo-Suez road. It was the first agreement that Israel signed with an Arab country after the outbreak of hostilities between Arabs and Israelis in 1949.

One of the chief mediators to the agreement, Henry Kissinger, US Secretary of State, frequently used the term "constructive ambiguity" during the negotiations, to explain his negotiating strategy as well as the key purpose of the 6-Point Agreement. Provision B of the agreement contained an ambiguity that created an incentive for Israeli negotiators to engage in further talks leading to Israel's compliance with SC Resolution 340 and ensured that talks continue and arrive at a solution that would save the face of one of the two parties. This result could not have been achieved by a quick jump or a fiat.

Provision B says: "Both sides agree that discussions between them will begin immediately to settle the question of the return to the October 22 positions in the framework of agreement on the disengagement and separation of forces under the auspices of the UN." This provided for a syntactical ambiguity that allowed Egyptian and Israeli negotiators to interpret their accord in diametrically opposite ways. Egyptian negotiators interpreted this provision as a clear demand that Israel withdraw its armed force in accordance with United Nations Security Council Resolution 340, linking "return to the October 22 positions" and "under the auspices of the UN". By contrast, Israeli negotiators interpreted the provision as calling on the parties to negotiate a "separation of forces" agreement without any specific request to return to the October 22 lines, by linking "discussions... to settle the question" and "under the auspices of the UN".

=== Syrian–Israeli peace negotiations ===
In the course of the Syrian–Israeli peace negotiations, the call for a "comprehensive, just, and lasting peace" was replaced by the formula of "full peace for full withdrawal" in May 1993. The former requirement tended to link the Syrian–Israeli talks to the Palestinian and other negotiating tracks, whereas the latter formula of "full peace for full withdrawal" tended to sever such links and ties in favor of a separate settlement that "stands on its two feet", as the Israelis put it. This short-lived "constructive ambiguity" may have witnessed a face-saving attempt by Syrian President Hafez al-Assad to maintain coordination among the different Arab-Israeli negotiating tracks while offering Israel a full contractual peace in return for the Golan Heights. The revelation of the Oslo Accords between Israel and the PLO in the summer of 1993 effectively ended this ambiguity, whereas the subsequent Israel–Jordan peace treaty of October 1994 rendered it irrelevant. Syria's neighbors, for their part, no longer sought "comprehensive peace".

=== Sinn Féin ===
Sinn Féin is a political party in Northern Ireland that was often affiliated with terrorism while pursuing Irish unity. US Northern Ireland Special Envoy Mitchell Reiss has pointed out its cynical use of constructive ambiguity, when in the 1990s, Sinn Féin adopted a strategy labeled as "TUAS". Within the policy document, this acronym meant "Tactical Use of Armed Struggle"; however, the same acronym was publicly translated to mean "Totally Unarmed Strategy."

== Constructive ambiguities in international trade law ==
Some recent bilateral trade agreements such as the Australia-United States Free Trade Agreement (AUSFTA) and Republic of Korea-United States Free Trade Agreement (KORUSFTA)have produced final texts after contentious and largely unresolved negotiations about whether, for example, pharmaceutical innovation (a constructive ambiguity) should be 'valued' (also a constructive ambiguity) through the operation of nominally competitive markets (requiring strong anti-trust law to be effective) (the United States position) or through expert evidence-based assessment of objectively demonstrated cost-effectiveness (the Australian and Korean positions).

Concern has been expressed in the academic literature that the inclusion of non-violation nullification of benefits (NVNB)provisions in such bilateral trade agreements could encourage ongoing lobbying by multinational corporations of domestic policy makers to pass legislation rewarding their version of the trade deal mentioned constructive ambiguity of innovation (see Annex 2C.1 of the AUSFTA) causing issues for democratic sovereignty over domestic policy.

== See also ==
- Policy of deliberate ambiguity
