= Trade Justice Movement =

British social movement

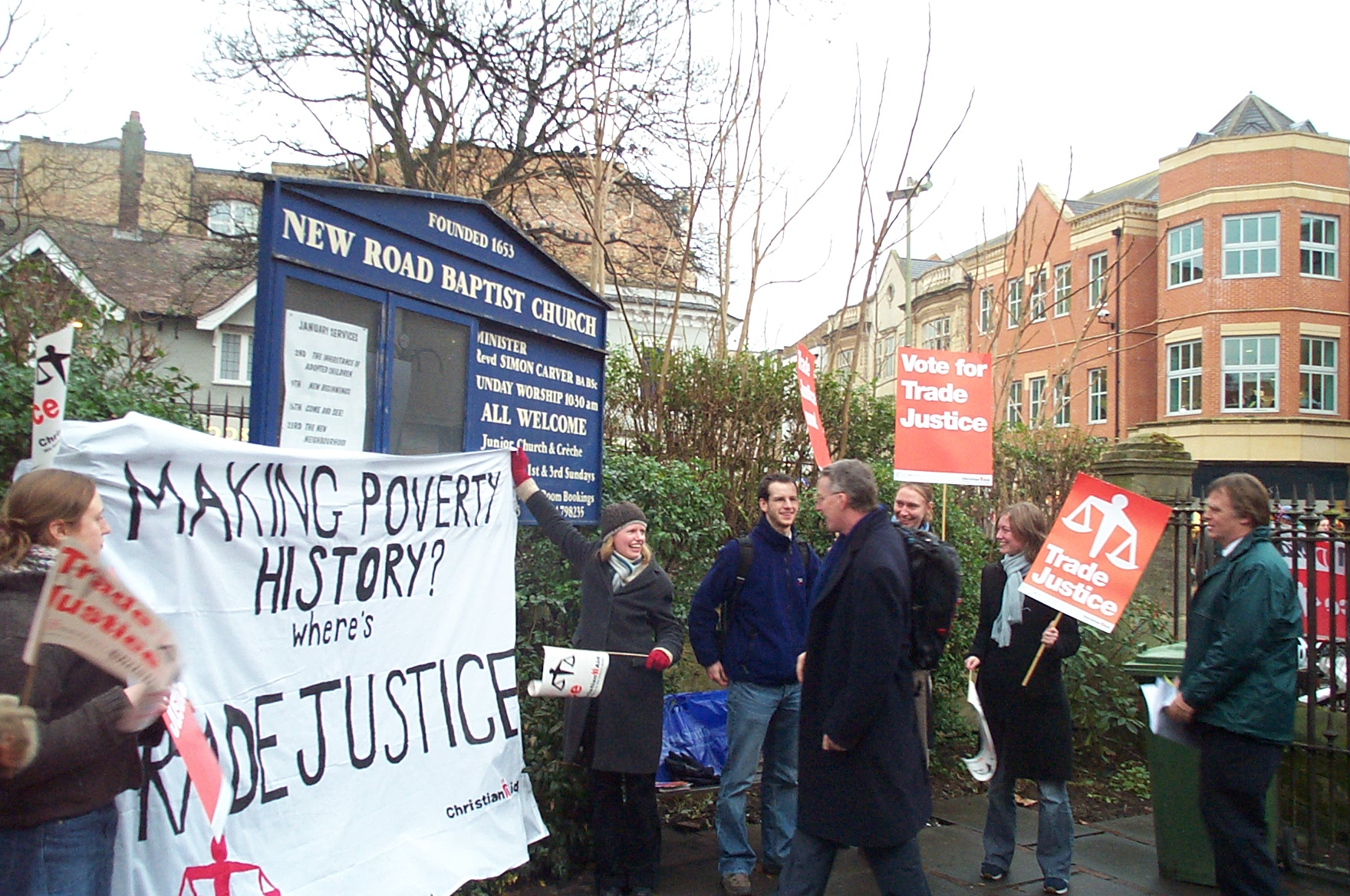
Activists from Christian Aid lobbying for Trade Justice.

The Trade Justice Movement is a British coalition, founded in 2000, of more than 60 organizations campaigning for trade justice.

The Trade Justice Movement provides expertise and analysis to civil society organisations, politicians and the media across a range of trade issues. Examples include the ways in which trade and trade agreements can impact on climate goals, poverty reduction and gender equality. It is a membership network of more than 60 organisations, including development and environment NGOs, trade unions, human rights campaigns, Fairtrade organizations, and faith and consumer groups.
