= Jeanne-Mance Delisle =

Canadian writer

Jeanne-Mance Delisle (born June 24, 1941; some sources say 1939) is a Quebec writer.

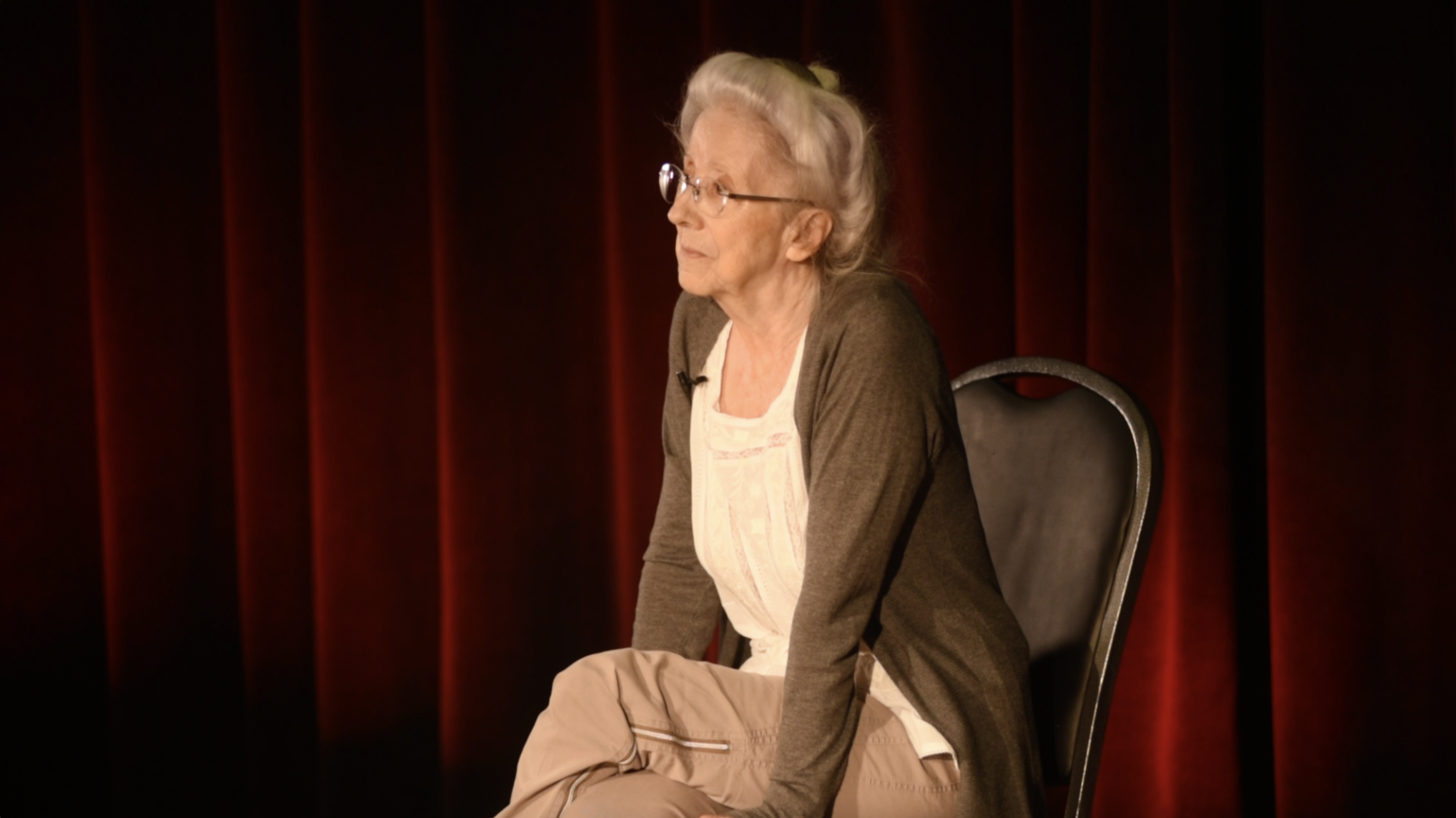

The daughter of Rollande Fiset and Sebastien Delisle, she was born in Barraute and grew up in the Abitibi region of Quebec. She was a member of Théâtre de Coppe and the Centre dramatique de Rouyn. Her first play Un "reel" ben beau, ben triste was awarded the Prix littéraire Abitibi-Témiscamingue. She received the Governor General's Award for French-language drama in 1987 for Un oiseau vivant dans la gueule; the play was later translated into English as A live bird in its jaws. Delisle has written for both the theatre and television.

== Selected works ==
Sources:

- Un rire oublié, play (1979)
- Le Mémoire d'or, play (1980)
- Nouvelles d'Abitibi, stories (1991), received the Grand Prix de la prose from the Journal de Montréal
- La bête rouge, novel (1996)
