= Non-violation nullification of benefits =

Dispute settlement genre in international trade

Non-violation nullification of benefits (NVNB) claims are a species of dispute settlement in the World Trade Organization arising under World Trade Organization multilateral and bilateral trade agreements. A nation may make an NVNB claim against another under the General Agreement on Tariffs and Trade if the other nation has conducted a legal action which nevertheless reduces or nullifies the benefits of some negotiated concession.

NVNB claims are controversial in that they are widely perceived to promote the social vices of unpredictability and uncertainty in international trade law. Other commentators have described NVNB claims as potentially inserting corporate competition policy into the World Trade Organization Dispute Settlement Understanding (DSU). As of August 2023, no NVNB claim has ever been successful.

== Location of NVNB claims ==
NVNB claims are directly referred to in Article 26 of the World Trade Organization DSU, Article XXIII of the General Agreement on Tariffs and Trade 1994 (GATT 1994) Article XXIII of the General Agreement on Trade in Services (GATS) and Article 64 of the Agreement on Trade-Related Aspects of Intellectual Property Rights (TRIPS).
In GATT jurisprudence, NVNB complaints appear to have originally been designed to counter the capacity of countries to avoid relatively simple obligations and specific tariff concessions in multilateral trade agreements, by making ambiguous domestic regulatory arrangements.

NVNB claims provisions also exist in many bilateral trade agreements. In the Australia-United States Free Trade Agreement(AUSFTA) article 21.2 (c) provides an NVNB claim:

Except as otherwise provided in this Agreement or as the Parties otherwise agree, the dispute settlement provisions of this Section shall apply with respect to the avoidance or settlement of all disputes between the Parties regarding the interpretation or application of this Agreement or wherever a Party considers that:

(a) a measure of the other party is inconsistent with its obligations under this Agreement (b) the other Party has otherwise failed to carry out its obligations under this Agreement; or

(c) a benefit the Party could reasonably have expected to accrue to it under Chapters Two (National Treatment and Market Access for Goods [including Annex 2C on pharmaceuticals]), Three (Agriculture), Five (Rules of Origin), Ten (Cross-Border Trade in Services), Fifteen (Government Procurement) or Seventeen (Intellectual Property Rights) is being nullified or impaired as a result of a measure that is not inconsistent with this Agreement.

The Australian academic Thomas Alured Faunce has argued that by expressly applying Annex 2C on pharmaceuticals, the NVNB claim in article 21.2(c) of the AUSFTA may have been responsible for lobbying by United States negotiators around the constructive ambiguity of reward of innovation (through the Medicines Working Group established by article 2C of the AUSFTA) that influenced Australian legislative changes impacting on reference pricing under the Pharmaceutical Benefits Scheme. He maintains that such pressure from NVNB claims is most likely to arise from 'behind doors' lobbying using threats of cross-retaliation (threatening a trade dispute in one trade area to obtain a result in a different sector) if a planned or existing domestic policy is perceived to breach the 'spirit' of the relevant bilateral trade agreement. Formal dispute resolution proceedings may never be initiated or be intended to commence if such lobbying is persuasive. If this hypothesis is correct, it represents a disturbing example of regulatory capture and has worrying implications for democratic sovereignty. The Australian government, however, strenuously denies such claims.

== Operation of NVNB claims ==
Under such NVNB provisions, the full range of dispute resolution mechanisms may be invoked whether or not a breach of any specific provision is alleged or substantiated. The precondition is that a 'reasonably expected' 'benefit' accruing under the relevant trade agreement, has been 'nullified or impaired' by a 'measure' applied by a WTO Member. Five requisite elements of a NVNB claim arguably have been identified by Dispute Resolution Panels:
1. That a 'measure' has been applied by a party subsequent to the entry into force of the relevant trade agreement;
2. That a 'benefit' was reasonably expected by the other party as being negotiated in return for some textual agreement; and
3. That as a result of the application of the measure that benefit has been 'nullified or impaired.'
4. That the nullification or impairment was contrary to the legitimate or reasonable expectations of the complainant at the time of the negotiations
5. That such claims will only be used in extremely rare circumstances (for example proven bad faith during negotiations), due to their capacity to upset the certainty of the international trading order.

== Debate about NVNB claims ==
Article 3.2 of the World Trade Organization DSU requires panels to clarify existing provisions of agreements in accordance with customary rules of interpretation of public international law. This leads to consideration of how the NVNB principle interacts with Article 26 of the Vienna Convention on the Law of Treaties, incorporating the principle of pacta sunt servanda: "Every treaty in force is binding upon the parties to it and must be performed by them in good faith." NVNB claims appear to undermine this fundamental principle of international law by subsequent reinterpretations based on the 'spirit' of the agreement.

Both the United States and European Economic Community have argued before a GATT 1994 panel that recourse to NVNB claims should remain 'exceptional' or the trading world would be plunged into a state of precariousness and uncertainty. Despite this, however, the United States has inserted NVNB claims in many bilateral trade agreements.

The Appellate Body in the WTO EC - Asbestos Case agreed with the Panel in the WTO Japan – Film Case, stating that the non-violation nullification or impairment remedy in GATT Article XXIII:1(b): "should be approached with caution and treated as an exceptional concept." The reason for this caution is straightforward. Members negotiate the rules that they agree to follow and only exceptionally would expect to be challenged for actions not in contravention of those rules.

The governments of Canada, the Czech Republic, the European Communities, Hungary and Turkey have stated at the World Trade Organization that "the uncertainty regarding the application of such non-violation complaints needs to be resolved so as to minimize the possibility of unintended interpretation."

Contemporary controversy over NVNB claims and proceedings arises in large part from their potential to allow a WTO Member to threaten a trade dispute if a wide and largely undefined range of domestic regulatory components are not altered, or compensation organised. It may facilitate a WTO dispute settlement process involving deliberate diplomatic ‘gaming’ of trade ‘rules,’ breaking of finely balanced textual truces and dispute panel interpretations that more an act of ongoing negotiation, than judicial analysis.

== WTO Moratorium on NVNB Claims ==
At the WTO meeting in Hong Kong in December 2005, the United States delegation pushed hard behind the scenes for trade concessions in return for its acquiescence to the moratorium on the use of NVNB provisions under TRIPS. The resultant Ministerial Declaration left the position of NVNB claims under TRIPS extremely uncertain.

45. We take note of the work done by the Council for Trade-Related Aspects of Intellectual Property Rights pursuant to paragraph 11.1 of the Doha Decision on Implementation-Related Issues and Concerns and paragraph 1.h of the Decision adopted by the General Council on 1 August 2004, and direct it to continue its examination of the scope and modalities for complaints of the types provided for under subparagraphs 1(b) and 1(c) of Article XXIII of GATT 1994 and make recommendations to our next Session. It is agreed that, in the meantime, Members will not initiate such complaints under the TRIPS Agreement.

— WTO Ministerial Conference Sixth Session Hong Kong,

== Circumscribing NVNB Claims in Trade Law Dispute Resolution Panels ==
One way of circumscribing NVNB claims so they are compatible with the obligation to act in good faith and with other rules of treaty interpretation under Articles 31 and 32 of the Vienna Convention on the Law of Treaties is to restrict their operation to ensuring 'transparency and openness' in the negotiating process. In consequence, in NVNB disputes, the inquiry to be made by a dispute resolution Panel is whether the complaining party was induced into error during negotiations by the other treaty Party about a fact or situation, that the former could not reasonably have foreseen.

== See also ==
- Non-tariff barriers to trade
