= United Nations Security Council Resolution 340 =

UN Security Council Resolution 340
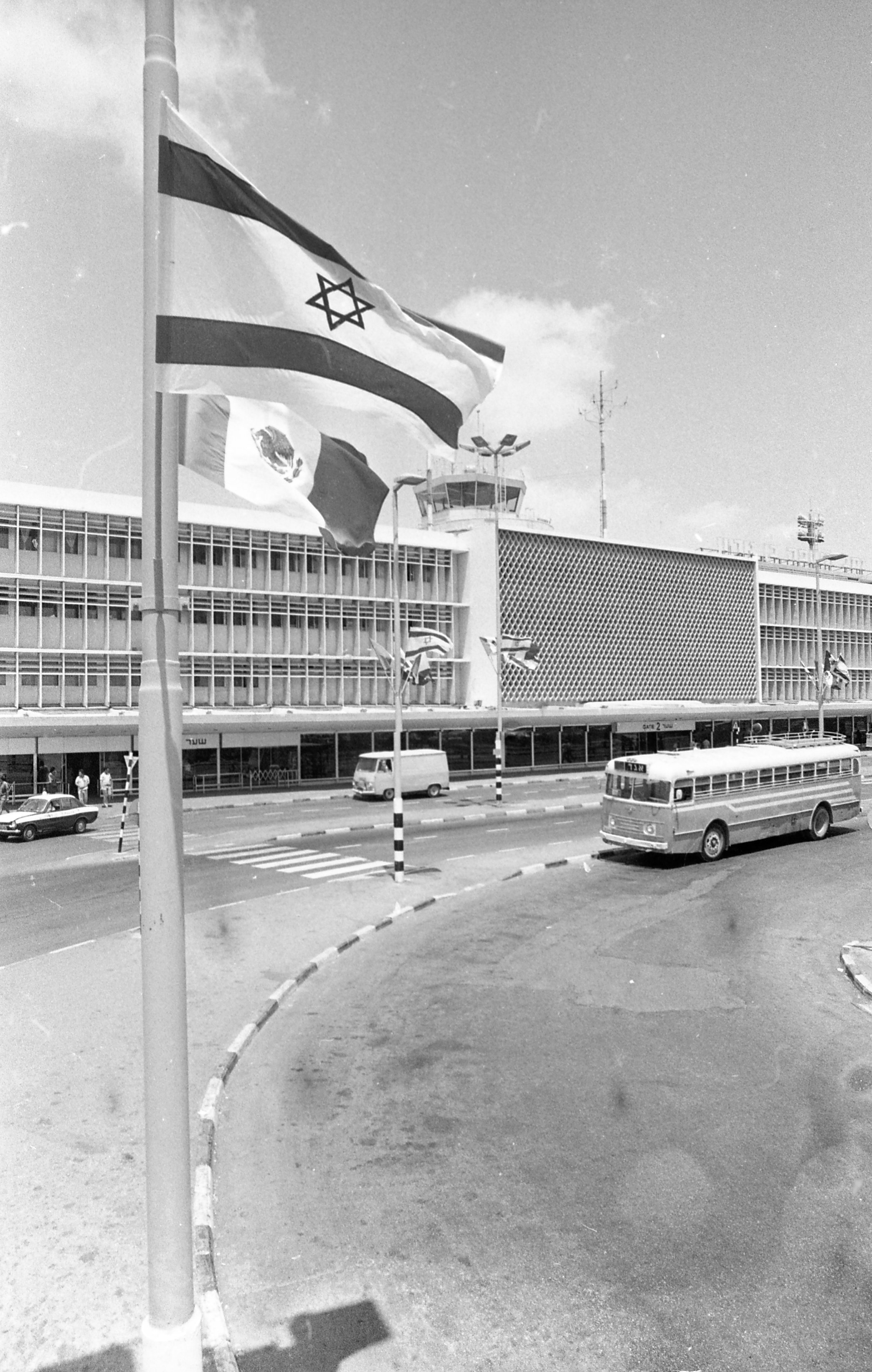
- Israel flag
- Date: 25 October 1973
- Meeting no.: 1,750
- Code: S/RES/340 (Document)
- Subject: UN Emergency Force for the Middle East
- Voting summary: 14 voted for; None voted against; None abstained
- Result: Adopted

Security Council composition
- Permanent members: China; France; Soviet Union; United Kingdom; United States
- Non-permanent members: Australia; Austria; Guinea; India; Indonesia; Kenya; Panama; Peru; Sudan; Yugoslavia

United Nations Security Council Resolution 340 was adopted on October 25, 1973, during the Yom Kippur War. It was passed after the Security Council was informed of the apparent failure of UNSCR 338 and UNSCR 339 to end the fighting.

In UNSCR 340, the Council demanded that the belligerent parties cease fire immediately and completely, and return to the positions occupied by them at 1650 GMT on 22 October 1973.

The Council also

- Requested the Secretary-General to increase the number of United Nations military observers on both sides of the cease-fire lines.
- Set up a United Nations Emergency Force to be composed of personnel drawn from UN member states except the permanent members of the Security Council.
- Requested the Secretary-General to report back within 24 hours on these two provisions.
- Requested the Secretary-General report back on a continuing basis on the implementation of this resolution, as well as 338 and 339, and requested all member states to co-operate fully in the implementation of these resolutions.

The resolution was adopted with 14 votes to none. The People's Republic of China did not vote or formally abstain.

== See also ==
- Arab–Israeli conflict
- List of United Nations Security Council Resolutions 301 to 400 (1971–1976)
- United Nations Truce Supervision Organization
- Yom Kippur War
