= United Nations Millennium Campaign =

- Abbreviation: UNMC
- Formation: 2002
- Type: UN campaign office
- Legal status: active
- Headquarters: New York City, U.S.
- Head: Mitchell Toomey
- Website: http://www.endpoverty2015.org/

The United Nations Millennium Campaign (UNMC) was a UN campaign unit that was set up in response to the Millennium Declaration signed by 189 member states. Established in October, 2002, the UNMC aimed to increase support to achieve the Millennium Development Goals and seek a coalition of partners for action. The Millennium Campaign targets intergovernmental, government, civil society organizations and media at both global and regional levels.

== Background ==
In 2000, leaders of 189 countries assembled in New York to outline a series of targets to address the most serious challenges in the developing world. The MDGs were an eight-point road map with measurable targets and clear deadlines for improving the lives of the world's poorest people. World leaders have agreed to achieve the MDGs by 2015.

== Establishment ==
In October 2002, two years after the Millennium Declaration was signed, the Millennium Campaign was established by then-Secretary General Kofi Annan and UNDP Administrator Mark Malloch Brown as a response to the failing efforts of governments in keeping their promises and commitments to achieve the MDGs by the target year 2015. On October 1, 2002, Eveline Herfkens was appointed by Kofi Annan as his Executive Coordinator for the Millennium Campaign, for a period of 4 years, later prolonged with an additional year by a decision of the UNDP Executive Office. She continued to be involved in the Campaign as its Founder and Special Advisor to the UNDP Director on a volunteer basis until 2009.

=== Purpose ===
Consistent with the call in the Monterrey Consensus for a “global information campaign”, the Millennium Campaign aimed to increase support for development assistance, trade opportunities, debt relief, technology transfer and other support needed to achieve the MDGs and, in the process, encourage the emergence of broad, self-sustaining and pragmatic coalitions of partners for action on the MDGs. The global Millennium Campaign targets intergovernmental and international bodies/forums at global and regional levels; national governments and legislatures; civil society organizations; the private sector; and the media.

== Structure ==
=== Leadership ===
Following Eveline Herfkens, the Millennium Campaign Unit was headed by a Director, reporting to and working closely with the UNDP Administrator. While focusing primarily on building the external dimensions of the Millennium Campaign, the Director also ensured that the unit operates as a bridge to the analytical, communication and campaigning efforts of the UN system.

Directors of the unit included Salil Shetty 2008-2010 and Corinne Woods, who took office on August 2, 2010.

=== Functions ===
- Disseminate data and analysis emerging from the substantive efforts of the UN system (Secretary General’s Reports, the Millennium Village Project and MDG country reports)
- Forge connections between the global Millennium Campaign and the existing campaigns and movements led or supported by UN agencies
- Promote networking, consultation and partnership-building among key actors, especially from civil society, and engage them in monitoring and analysis
- Help coordinate campaign strategies and consistent messages

== Stand Up ==
On 15–16 October 2006, 23,542,614 millennials, in over eighty countries around the world set a new Guinness World Record for the largest number of people to "STAND UP AGAINST POVERTY". The United Nations decided to utilize the millennials based on the years of research concluding that for millennials, fulfilling their social worth is the ultimate reward they can get, life for them is an adventure, and so the campaign gives them the biggest movement they have yet to take.

It will capitalize on their eagerness to be a part of something big and meaningful that can create a significant change and empowerment.

Since 2007, the UN Millennium Campaign has organized record breaking Stand Up events annually around the world. The number of participants reached 173 million in 2009. Stand Up 2010 took place from September 17 to 19.

== See also ==
- United Nations Development Programme
- Millennium Village Project
- UNICEF
- WHO
- WFP
- G8 and G20
- USAID
- Canadian International Development Agency
- DFID
- OneWorld South Asia
- Other development aid agencies
