= EndPoverty.org =

US-based non-profit organization

Endpoverty.org
- Type: 501(c)(3)
- Tax ID no.: 54-1371549
- Headquarters: Oakton, Virginia
- Revenue: $361,479 (2015)
- Website: www.endpoverty.org

endPoverty.org is a faith-based 501(c)(3) non-profit organization whose mission is to empower the working poor in developing countries to lift themselves out of poverty. It accomplishes this by providing small loans, coaching, and technical assistance through a network of locally led partner organizations in 37 countries to equip families living in poverty to improve their own lives. Since 1985, the organization has helped over 200,000 small businesses worldwide.

== Organization ==
endPoverty.org is headquartered in Bethesda, United States, and currently works with a partner network of microfinance and development institutions in twelve countries: Uganda, South Africa, Egypt, Philippines, Bangladesh, India, Romania, Slovakia, Guatemala, Mexico, Nicaragua and the United States.

== History ==
endPoverty.org was founded in 1985 out of the vision of Paris Reidhead, an American missionary in Sudan, to equip poor entrepreneurs to help themselves and their families out of poverty. The organization's former names include Enterprise Development International and Transformation International.
