= Make Poverty History =

Anti-poverty campaigns

Make Poverty History were organizations in a number of countries, which focused on issues relating to 8th Millennium Development Goal such as aid, trade and justice. They generally formed a coalition of aid and development agencies which worked together to raise awareness of global poverty and achieve policy change by governments. The movement has existed in Australia, Canada, Denmark, Finland, New Zealand, Nigeria, Norway, Romania, South Africa, Ireland, the United Arab Emirates, the United States of America, and the United Kingdom. The various national campaigns were part of the international Global Call to Action Against Poverty campaign.

== British and Irish campaign ==
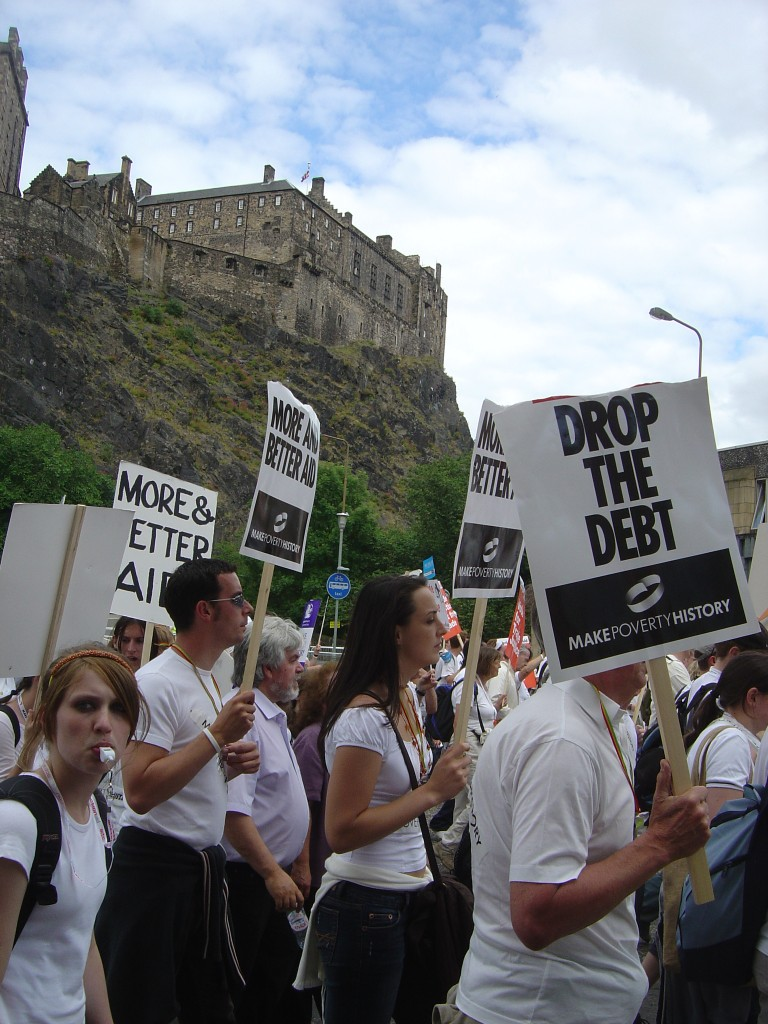
An estimated 225,000 (BBC News) campaigners marched in Edinburgh on July 2, 2005.

The Make Poverty History campaign in Great Britain and Ireland is a coalition of charities, religious groups, trade unions, campaigning groups and celebrities who mobilise around Britain's prominence in world politics, as of 2005, to increase awareness and pressure governments into taking actions towards relieving absolute poverty. The symbol of the campaign is a white "awareness bracelet" made of cotton or silicone. Usually, on the band the words would be written in black, with the "Poverty" word a lighter shade. A "virtual" white band was also available to be displayed on websites.

Television advertisements ran for many months, urging people to speak to their representatives about stopping poverty. However, the Office of Communications (Ofcom) banned the ads, deciding that the ads were "wholly or mainly political" in nature, since they aimed to "achieve important changes".

The three demands of the campaign were:

- "Trade Justice"
- Drop the debt
- More and "better" aid

None of these aims were new (there were many attempts over the preceding decades to promote them), but the scale of the 2005 campaign dwarfed previous efforts.

On January 31, 2006, the majority of the members of the campaign passed a resolution to disband the organisation, arguing that the British coalition had only agreed to come together formally for a limited lifespan, to correspond with Britain holding the presidency of the EU and G8. Approximately forty groups argued against the dissolution.

On January 23, 2013, the Enough Food For Everyone IF campaign was launched, by a group of over 100 aid organisations and religious groups. Sometimes called Make Poverty History 2, or simply the IF campaign, the new undertaking is the biggest of its kind since the original make poverty history campaign of 2005. It coincides with Britain once again assuming presidency of the G8. The central theme of the campaign concerns ending hunger, with four strands aimed at tackling the root causes:

- the need for wealthy nations to keep their promises on aid.
- the need to combat tax avoidance.
- the need to combat land grabs
- the need for greater transparency from governments and large corporations, concerning their actions that impact on hunger.

The launch of the campaign was welcomed by Britain's prime minister David Cameron, and supported by international figures such as Bill Gates and Archbishop Desmond Tutu. On June 8, the IF campaign mobilized about 45,000 people to demonstrate in Hyde Park, while a hunger summit underway elsewhere in London saw £2.7 billion in new commitments made to tackle hunger. Speaking on the eve of the June 2013 G8 summit at Lough Erne, the Archbishop of York delivered a message on behalf of the IF campaign, calling on world leaders to take substantive action to relieve hunger, saying it is a scandal that malnutrition is allowed to lead to the death of a child every ten seconds.

The IF campaign coalition commissioned an external evaluation of the campaign. The evaluation report assesses progress against objectives and captures learnings for future work.

=== Events ===
Make Poverty History set out a timescale revolving around the 31st G8 summit in Gleneagles, Scotland on July 6, 2005.

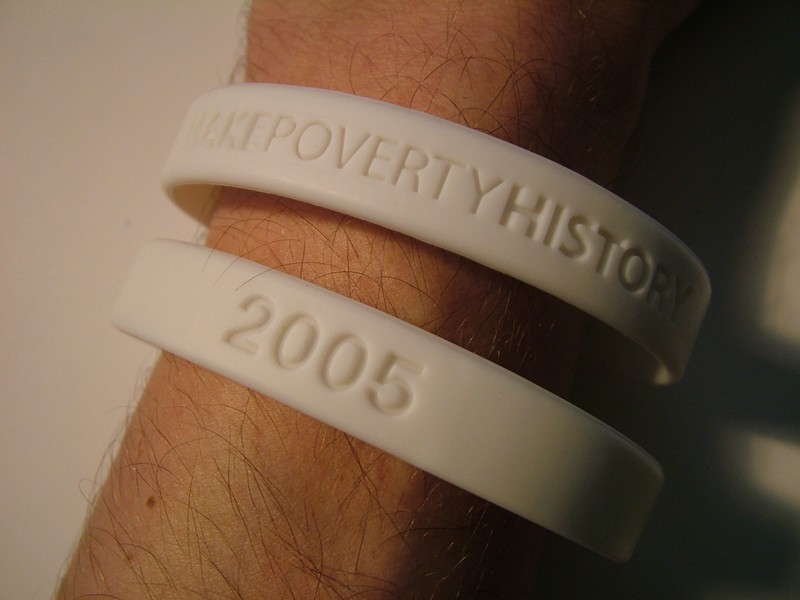
Plastic version of the "white band"

The campaign was given a high-profile launch on British television on New Year's Day 2005 in a special edition of The Vicar of Dibley, written by Richard Curtis, who pledged support for the campaign during 2005. The same issues were highlighted in Curtis' television drama The Girl in the Café, in an episode broadcast on June 25 on the BBC One channel in the UK on the HBO channel in the U.S. and on ABC TV in Australia.

- Britain assumed presidency of the G8 on January 1, 2005, and hosted the summit with poverty in Africa being, at least nominally, a major topic for discussion.
- The Commission for Africa, launched by Tony Blair in February 2004, aimed to help create a strong and prosperous Africa. Their report, published in March 2005, was a focal point for the British presidency of the G8.
- In the second half of 2005, Britain held the EU presidency.
- July 1, 2005, was the first international "White Band Day", a worldwide day of action.
- July 2 – Over 225,000 protesters demonstrated in Edinburgh to promote the campaign's demands. On the same day, the Live 8 concerts took place before the G8 summit to encourage activism and debate within the G8 member countries, with the aim of increasing political pressure on the leaders.
- July 3 – boats set off to Cherbourg in France to pick up protesters as part of Sail 8
- July 6 – The final Live 8 concert, named Edinburgh 50,000 – The Final Push rocks Edinburgh in the final strike to persuade G8 Leaders to double aid in Africa. Demonstrators walked overnight up to 20 miles to reach Gleneagles as the A8 had been closed.
- The 20th anniversary of Live Aid was on July 13, 2005.
- September 10 was the second international "White Band Day".
- The United Nations General Assembly Special Summit on the Millennium Development Goals, September 2005. This summit reviewed the progress since 2000 of the Millennium Development Goals, including halving the proportion of people living in poverty by 2015.
- December 10 was the third international "White Band Day".

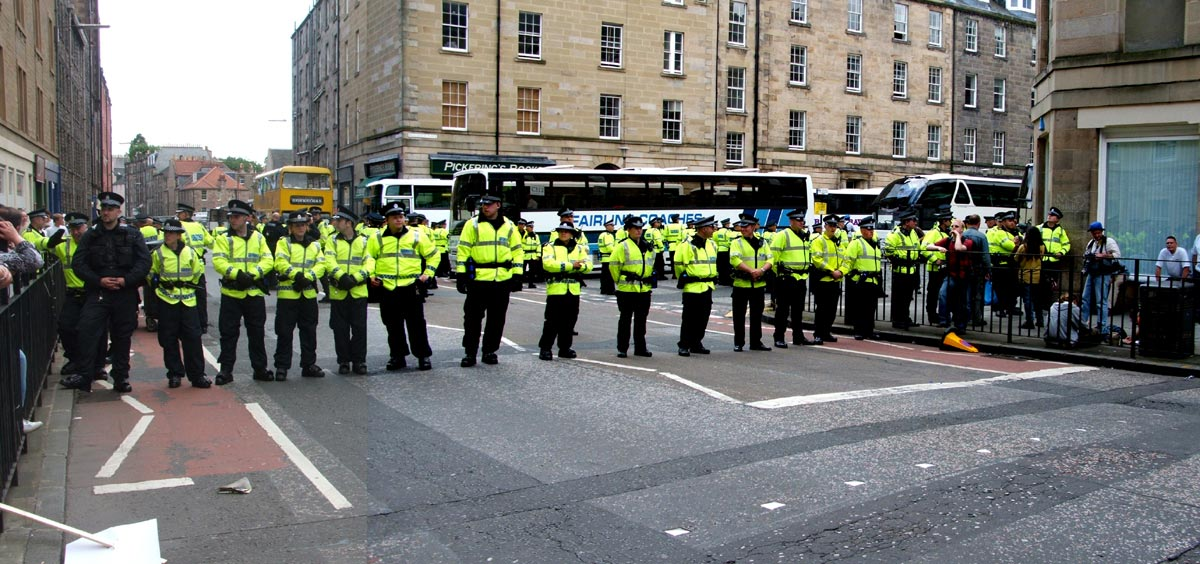
Police at the Edinburgh demonstration; Buccleuch Street

=== Member organizations ===
The British campaign had over 540 member organisations including many faith groups, trade unions and charities. It was coordinated by British Overseas NGOs for Development (Bond).

Whilst the anti-war group CND was a member, the Stop the War Coalition (StWC) asked to join but was refused. Make Poverty History's governing body, the coordination team, cited the substantial political party affiliations of the governing body of StWC as the primary reason. They also gave the grounds that the issues of economic justice are separate from those of Iraq War, and STWC participation in Edinburgh on July 2 would confuse the message. In a highly critical article in Red Pepper magazine, Stuart Hodkinson asserted that this was ironic since Oxfam a member of the coordination team "is currently leading a worldwide campaign for an international arms treaty on the basis that uncontrolled arms fuels poverty and suffering."

The movement was characterised by rifts between Oxfam and the other participating organisations, partly over tactics and partly due to concerns that Oxfam was too close to Tony Blair and New Labour.

== Canadian campaign ==
The Canadian Make Poverty History campaign was launched in February 2005 by a coalition coordinated by Gerry Barr, President and CEO of the Canadian Council for International Co-operation. The campaign is supported by a coalition of charities, trade unions, faith groups, students, academics, literary, artistic and sports leaders such as actor Mary Walsh, musician Tom Cochrane, Olympian Anna van der Kamp, actors Roy Dupuis and Pascale Montpetit, and United Nations special envoy Stephen Lewis.

Make Poverty History has four main objectives in Canada:

- More and better foreign aid
- Trade justice
- Cancellation of all debts owed by poor countries to developed countries like Canada
- Elimination of child poverty in Canada

The French-language version of the Make Poverty History is "Abolissons La Pauvreté". While this literally translates to "let's abolish poverty", neither the English- nor French-language versions of the Canadian campaign should be confused with End Poverty Now. The former represents the Canadian Make Poverty History campaign; the latter is a stand-alone organization that, while remaining affiliated with the campaign, was created independently by a small grouping of MPH Canada's member base.

See related article, Poverty in Canada

== US "ONE" Campaign ==
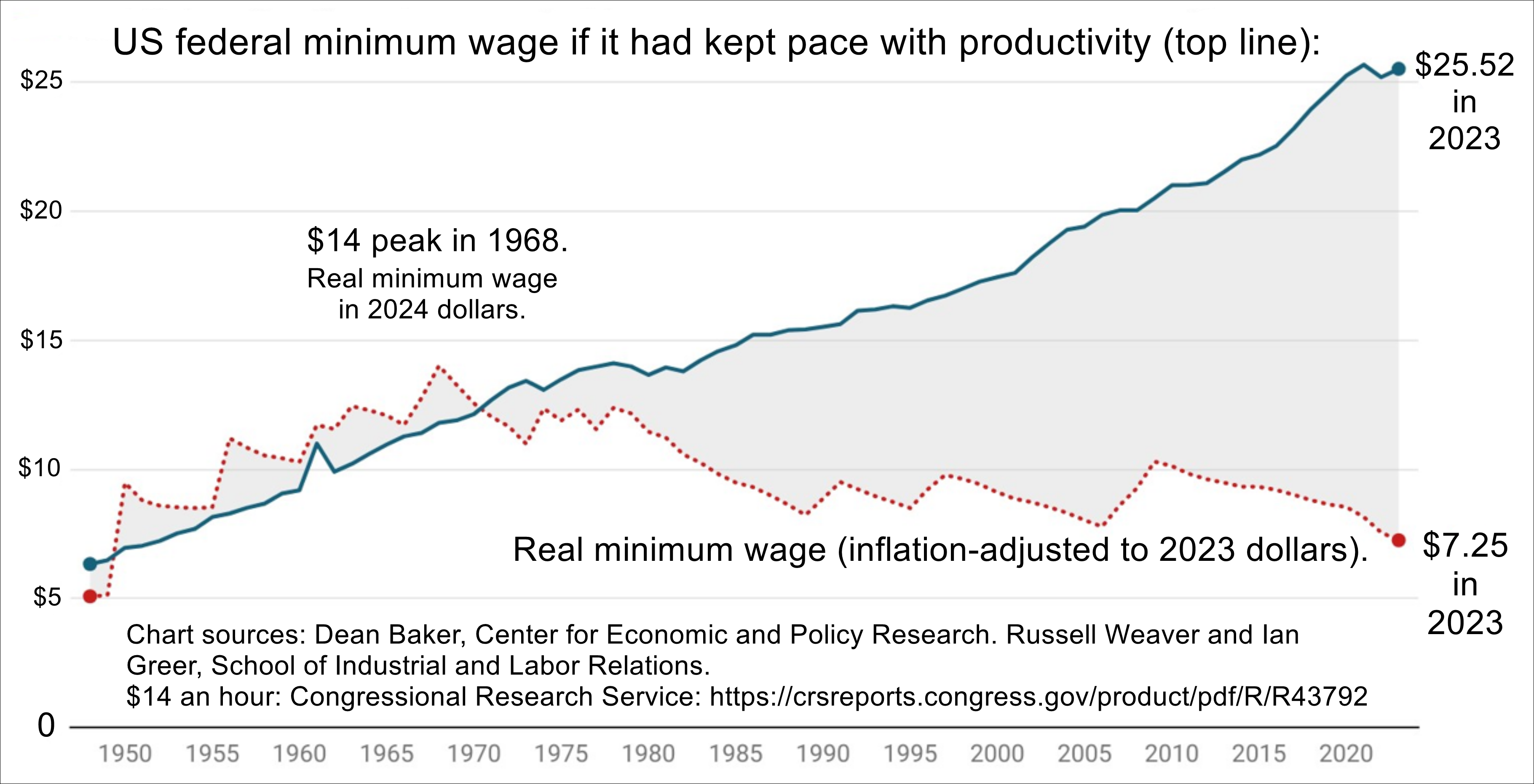
US federal minimum wage if it had kept pace with productivity. Also, the real minimum wage.

In April 2005, a commercial began airing in the United States with several celebrities in black and white stating the pledge of the American ONE Campaign, their version of Make Poverty History. The commercial featured 33 celebrities and personalities; names as diverse as religious leaders Pat Robertson and Frank Griswold; singers including Bono, P. Diddy, Mos Def and Jewel; and various actors including Brad Pitt, Susan Sarandon, Al Pacino and Antonio Banderas. At the end, Tom Hanks states, "We're not asking for your money. We're asking for your voice."

The general goals of the ONE campaign in the United States are to end extreme poverty, hunger and AIDS.

The founding sponsors of ONE are Bread for the World, CARE, DATA, International Medical Corps, International Rescue Committee, Mercy Corps, Oxfam America, Plan USA, Save the Children US, World Concern, and World Vision. They have strong ties with the NBA, MTV's Rock the Vote, and the United Nations Millennium Campaign.

== Norwegian campaign ==
The Norwegian campaign was started by Norwegian Church Aid on June 9. Haakon Magnus, Crown Prince of Norway and Kjell Magne Bondevik are some of the celebrities in Norway that wear a white Make Poverty History band.

The three demands of the Norwegian campaign are:

- "Trade justice"
- Drop the debt
- More and "better" aid

The shops in Norway that sell Make Poverty history bands are Cubus and Dressman, two Norwegian clothing shops.

== Australian campaign ==
The Australian campaign is coordinated by the Australian Council for International Development (ACFID) and is a coalition of more than 60 member organisations, drawn mainly from the Non Government Aid and development sector, including World Vision, Oxfam, Caritas, The Oaktree Foundation and Engineers Without Borders.

In November 2006, Melbourne hosted the Make Poverty History Concert to align with the G20 Summit. Since then, the Make Poverty History campaign has continued to create awareness for the need for increased overseas aid and greater measures of effectiveness, through the yearly Stand Up Against Poverty campaign, as well as major campaigns for the federal elections in 2007 and 2010, including Make Poverty History Roadtrips.

They also continue to incite social mobilisation among people in Australia, often being present at social and music events such as Falls Festival and Big Day Out, as well as having a great range of opportunities to organise their own campaigning events.

== Criticisms ==
Some critics, such as Theodore Dalrymple, allege that debt relief and aid are used to fund lavish lifestyles for the ruling class (although efforts are made to exclude these countries from the G8 debt relief).

Other critics were Mariéme Jamme of Africa gathering and Dambisa Moyo. Moyo argues that a campaign to reduce poverty in Africa should be undertaken by Africans, and the Make Poverty History was not, thereby undermining the leadership of African rulers.

Others were critical of the ending of the Make Poverty History coalition; the academic Alex Callinicos wrote in the Socialist Worker newspaper that "disbanding of MPH has a lot to do with the interests of the big NGOs that dominated it" and that "scrapping MPH was an utterly shameful decision. It can only promote the belief that those who currently dominate the world are benevolent figures who will, with a few pushes from below, continue to take 'small steady steps forwards'".

Some criticism also emerged from the campaign's wristbands, specifically from the fact that some of these were proven to have been produced by forced labourers in Chinese sweatshops.

== See also ==
- Global Call to Action Against Poverty
- International Day for the Eradication of Poverty
- Make Poverty History Emirates
- ONE Campaign
- Poverty in Africa
- Poverty in Canada
- Poverty in China
- Poverty in India
- Poverty in Pakistan
- Poverty in the United States
- Poverty industry
- Poverty reduction
- The Communist Manifesto
- United Nations Millennium Project
