= Global Call to Action Against Poverty =

Global anti-poverty movement/coalition

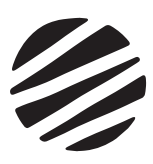
- Abbreviation: GCAP
- Formation: 1 January 2005
- Purpose: Advocacy Campaign/Anti-Poverty Coalition
- Region served: Worldwide
- Website: gcap.global

The Global Call to Action Against Poverty (GCAP) is a network of over civil society organizations (CSOs) organized in national groups. It advocates for justice and engages in activism opposing poverty and inequalities.

At its foundation, GCAP adopted the white band symbol. It co-led the significant single-issue campaign, "Stand UP Against Poverty," earning international recognition.

GCAP is recognized as one of the world's largest civil society movements.

== History ==
The concept for GCAP emerged in 2003 at a meeting of non-governmental organizations in Maputo, Mozambique, hosted by advocate for women's and children's rights, Graca Machel. The campaign was established at a conference in Johannesburg, South Africa in late 2004 and officially launched on January 1, 2005, during the World Social Forum in Brazil. It rapidly gained traction, becoming the largest anti-poverty campaign, notably during the 31st G8 summit at Gleneagles.

GCAP co-chair Ana Agostino said that the initial burst of energy could only be described as a passionate love affair. "We're now an old, married coalition, and we need to find a way to adjust to our new circumstances," Agostina said in 2008. GCAP faced challenges in the years following its establishment, notably an identity crisis in 2006-2007 when attempting to transforming that momentum into a global coalition. However, it persevered and in 2007, issued the Montevideo Declaration, advocating for democratizing global governance processes to prioritize equity, human security, and inclusion.

== Demands ==
Global Call to Action Against Poverty advocates for:

- Public accountability, just governance, and human rights fulfilment
- Women's rights and gender justice
- Climate justice
- Trade justice
- Aid and financing for development
- Debt cancellation
- Peace and security

== Operation ==
The campaign is guided by the Beirut Platform, established during GCAP's review session in March 2006. Operating in English, Spanish, French, and Arabic, GCAP convenes periodically to review its performance and plan future actions. The global coalition is based on the Beirut Platform (a revised version of the Johannesburg Declaration of 2005) from GCAP's review session in March 2006 in Beirut, Lebanon.

== Mobilisation dates ==
Throughout 2005, GCAP mobilized millions through a series of 'White Band Days', when the symbol was used to highlight the injustice of global poverty.

- White Band Day 1 – 1 July 2005
- White Band Day 2 – 10 September 2005
- White Band Day 3 – 10 December 2005
- White Band Day 4 – 17 October 2006 (part of the Month of Mobilization)
- White Band Day 5 – 17 October 2007

A month of mobilization was launched on 16 September 2005 (to coincide with the annual meetings of the IMF and World Bank) which will build up to a climax on White Band Day 4 on the 17 October (International Day for the Eradication of Poverty). During the month, countries around the world undertook an array of actions, culminating in the global white band day. The white band remains the campaign's symbol and expression of solidarity against poverty.

During 2007, national campaigns and coalitions were activated on significant national dates, including the international white band day.

From 1 September – 20 October 2008, concerned citizens in over 100 countries will unite again for 50 Global Days of Action Against Poverty, united by the symbol of the white band. They will be calling for governments to eradicate poverty, dramatically lessen inequality, and achieve the Millennium Development Goals.

The main body of the UK programme for the 50 Global Days of Action currently features 23 events, with over 50 NGOs and civil society organisations involved to date. It includes opportunities to influence major international meetings, lobbying at party conferences, an activist training forum, a stunt, public meetings, and a major demonstration against child poverty in the UK.

== 'Stand UP' Against Poverty ==
GCAP together with the UN-Millennium Campaign jointly set a Guinness World Record for the most people ever to simultaneously 'Stand Up' against poverty within a 24-hour period. The initiative was held as a part of GCAP's Month of Mobilization and the release of the record numbers was set to coincide with the last day of the Month, The International Day for the Eradication of Poverty.

2009 "Stand Up and Take Action against Poverty" campaign

A total of 173 million people around the world—2.5% of the world population—took part in the fourth Stand Up. This was a new Guinness World Record. Over 3,000 events were held in more than 120 countries in the fourth year of the "Stand Up, Take Action, End Poverty Now!" campaign. At least 100 million people in Asia took part in the campaign: Africa saw the participation of almost 40 million, the Arab region over 30 million, Europe more than 2 million, Latin America and North America some 200,000 each, and Oceania more than 170,000.

2006

In 2006, the 24-hour period started at 10:00am GMT on 15 October and ended at 10:00am GMT on 16 October. The record was confirmed and released by Guinness officials on 17 October. The official record, that Guinness calls "the largest single coordinated movement of people in the history of the Guinness World Record", is set at 23,542,614.

Stand Up events were registered in 85 countries across the world.

From 17 to 19 October 2008, citizens worldwide will attempt to break this record again. It is possible to register events at www.standagainstpoverty.org.

In the UK, around 200 events are expected as part of Stand Up and Take Action Against Poverty and Inequality. These will be supported by organisations and networks including ActionAid, WaterAid, Jubilee Debt Campaign, Stop Aids Campaign, DEA, Muslim Aid, Quaker Peace and Social Witness, CND, Skillshare, TIDAL, AMREF, Micah Challenge, World Association of Girl Guides and Girl Scouts, the Diocese of London, Pants To Poverty, and the International Young Professionals Association.

== National Campaign Coalitions ==
GCAP has coalitions present in over a hundred countries, a few of which are listed below. For a detailed list please see

- 2005: plus d 'excuses – France
- Deine Stimme Gegen Armut – Germany
- Hottokenai, Sekai no Mazushisa – Japan
- Make Poverty History – Australia
- Make Poverty History – Canada
- Make Poverty History – Ireland
- Make Poverty History – Emirates (UAE)
- Make Poverty History – United Kingdom
- Make Poverty History – Nigeria
- The ONE Campaign – Singapore
- The ONE Campaign – USA
- EEN – Armoede de Wereld uit – The Netherlands
- SANGOCO – South Africa
- Wada Na Todo – India
- No More Excuses – Philippines
- Gemeinsam gegen Armut – Switzerland

== See also ==
- EndPoverty.org
- Extreme poverty
- Make Poverty History
- Make Poverty History Emirates
