= Isaac Penington (Quaker) =

British theologian

Isaac Penington (1616–1679) was one of the early members of the Religious Society of Friends (Quakers) in England. He wrote about the Quaker movement and was an influential promoter and defender of it.

== Life ==
He was the oldest son of Isaac Penington, a Puritan who had served as the Lord Mayor of London. He entered the Inner Temple in 1634, and matriculated at St Catharine's College, Cambridge in 1637. He was called to the bar in 1639.

Convinced by the Quaker faith, Penington and his wife joined the Society of Friends in 1657 or 1658. He was imprisoned six times for his beliefs, starting in 1661. Sometimes the charge was refusal to take an oath, as this went against Quaker teachings (see testimony of integrity). Such action was prohibited by the Quakers Act 1662, which sought to control members of the group. At other times Penington was charged with attending a Quaker meeting, which was forbidden by the Conventicle Act 1664.

== Works ==
Penington became an influential promoter and defender of the Quaker movement, writing extensively on many topics, and published several books. His writings are prized for their exploration of spiritual experience, with his Letters being read continually within Quakerism for their spiritual counsel. His complete works were first published in 1681 and are still in print as of 2026.

== Family ==
Penington married a widow named Mary Springett, a notable woman in her own right, and they had five children. Her daughter Gulielma, from her first marriage to Sir William Springett (who died young), later married William Penn, founder of Pennsylvania, as his first wife.

== Sources ==
- The Works of Isaac Penington. In four volumes. Glenside, PA: Quaker Heritage Press, 1995–97.
- Claus Bernet (2010). "Isaac Penington (Quaker)". In Bautz, Traugott (ed.). Biographisch-Bibliographisches Kirchenlexikon (BBKL) (in German). Vol. 31. Nordhausen: Bautz. cols. 1031–1049. ISBN 978-3-88309-544-8.
- Tod, Ruth, Exploring Isaac Pennington, Quaker Quicks, Christian Alternative Books, Winchester UK (2023) ISBN 978-1-80341-184-2
