= Testimony of peace =

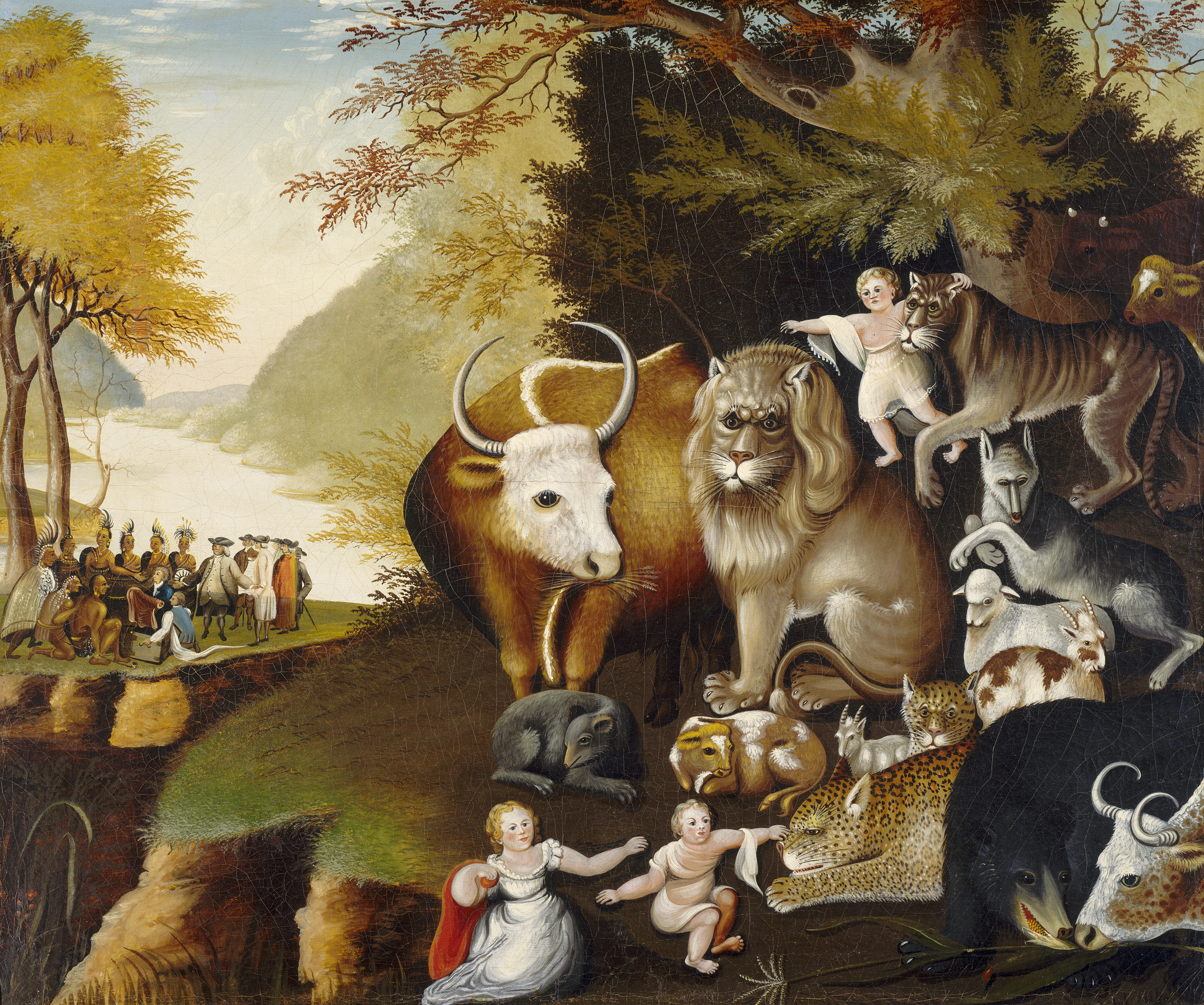
The Peaceable Kingdom (c. 1834) by Edward Hicks

The testimony of peace (a.k.a. testimony for peace or testimony against war) is the action generally taken by members of the Religious Society of Friends (Quakers) for peace and against participation in war. Like other Quaker testimonies, it is not a "belief", but a description of committed actions, in this case to promote peace, and refrain from and actively oppose participation in war. Quakers' original refusal to bear arms has been broadened to embrace protests and demonstrations in opposition to government policies of war and confrontations with others who bear arms, whatever the reason, in the support of peace and active nonviolence. Due to this core testimony, the Religious Society of Friends is considered one of the traditional peace churches.

== General explanation ==
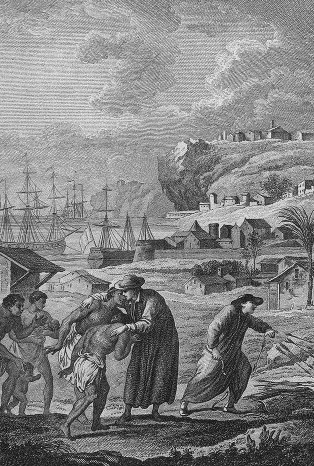
Quakers in Pennsylvania embracing with Native Americans; engraving by Clément-Pierre Marillier, 1775

Friends' testimony of peace is largely derived from beliefs arising from the teachings of Jesus to love one's enemies and Friends' belief in the inner light. Quakers believe that nonviolent confrontation of evil and peaceful reconciliation are always superior to violent measures. The testimony of peace does not mean that Quakers engage only in passive resignation; in fact, they often practice passionate activism.

The testimony of peace is probably the best known testimony of Friends. The belief that violence is wrong has persisted to this day, and many conscientious objectors, advocates of non-violence and anti-war activists are Friends. Due to their testimony of peace, Friends are considered one of the historic peace churches. In 1947 Friends as a worldwide religious group were awarded the Nobel Peace Prize, which was accepted by the American Friends Service Committee and the then London Yearly Meeting's Friends Service Committee, now called Britain Yearly Meeting Peace & Social Witness on behalf of all Friends. The testimony of peace has not always been well received in the world; on many occasions Friends have been imprisoned for refusing to serve in military activities.

Some Friends today regard the testimony of peace in even a broader sense, refusing to pay the portion of the income tax that goes to fund the military. Yearly Meetings in the United States, Britain and other parts of the world endorse and support these Friends' actions. The Quaker Council for European Affairs campaigns in the European Parliament for the right of conscientious objectors in Europe not to be made to pay for the military. Some do pay the money into peace charities and still get goods seized by bailiffs or money taken from their bank accounts.

In the United States, others pay into an escrow account in the name of the Internal Revenue Service, which the IRS can only access if they give an assurance that the money will only be used for peaceful purposes. Some Yearly meetings in the US run escrow accounts for conscientious objectors, both within and outside the Society.

Many Friends engage in various non-governmental organizations such as Christian Peacemaker Teams serving in some of the most violent areas of the world. Quaker author Howard Brinton, for example, served in the American Friends Service Committee during World War I.

== Development of Quaker beliefs about peace ==
George Fox, a founder of Quakerism, in 1651 made the first declaration of Friends' beliefs on peace:

Following the 1660 Restoration of King Charles II and a clamp-down on religious radical groups such as the Fifth Monarchists,

I told [the Commonwealth Commissioners] I lived in the virtue of that life and power that took away the occasion of all wars and I knew from whence all wars did rise, from the lust, according to James's doctrine... I told them I was come into the covenant of peace which was before wars and strifes were.

A number of letters and statements were written this year, as much to remove any suspicion that Friends might have been involved in violent political activity as a desire to make their position clear. Margaret Fell wrote a letter to King Charles II that was co-signed "in unity" by a number of prominent Friends, including Fox:

We are a people that follow after those things that make for peace, love, and unity; it is our desire that others' feet may walk in the same, and do deny and bear our testimony against all strife, and wars, and contentions that come from the lusts that war in the members, that war against the soul, which we wait for and watch for in all people, and love and desire the good of all.

The most well-known statement of this belief was stated later that year in a declaration to King Charles II of England in 1660 by George Fox and 11 others. This excerpt is commonly cited:

All bloody principles and practices we do utterly deny, with all outward wars, and strife, and fightings with outward weapons, for any end, or under any pretence whatsoever, and this is our testimony to the whole world. That spirit of Christ by which we are guided is not changeable, so as once to command us from a thing as evil and again to move unto it; and we do certainly know, and so testify to the world, that the spirit of Christ, which leads us into all Truth, will never move us to fight and war against any man with outward weapons, neither for the kingdom of Christ, nor for the kingdoms of this world.

Some Quakers initially opposed this statement because it did not deny use of the sword to the magistrate or ruler of the state. It also contained no prohibition against paying taxes for purposes of war, something that would trouble Friends to the present.

== Conscientious objection ==
In 1947, the Religious Society of Friends was awarded the Nobel Peace Prize. The Friends' testimony of peace is their best known.

Quakers have practised the testimony of peace by protesting against wars, refusing to serve in armed forces if drafted, seeking conscientious objector status when available, and even to participating in acts of civil disobedience. Not all Quakers embrace this testimony as an absolute; for example, there were Friends that fought in World War I and World War II. Some others were firm Christian pacifists. During extreme circumstances it has been difficult for some Quakers to engage in and uphold this testimony, yet Friends have almost universally been committed to the ideal of peace, even those who have felt the need to compromise on their testimony.

The Religious Society of Friends was awarded the Nobel Peace Prize in 1947. The Nobel Prize was awarded to Friends for Friends' work to relieve suffering and feed many millions of starving people during and after both world wars. The Nobel prize was accepted by the American Friends Service Committee, along with the UK's Friends Service Council on behalf of all Quakers.

The first paragraph of the Presentation Speech reads:

The Nobel Committee of the Norwegian Parliament has awarded this year's Peace Prize to the Quakers, represented by their two great relief organizations, the Friends Service Council in London and the American Friends Service Committee in Philadelphia.

== Broader expressions of the peace testimony ==
The peace testimony has been extended by contemporary Friends beyond opposition to war and conscientious objection to encompass broader understandings of violence and harm.

The connection between the peace testimony and vegetarianism has deep roots in Quaker thought. Thomas Tryon, a seventeenth-century contemporary of the first Friends, practised vegetarianism as part of a comprehensive nonviolent worldview, and criticised early Quakers for continuing to eat meat, arguing that in doing so they failed to live out the full implications of their own nonviolent principles. John Woolman extended this concern to the "whole creation, animal as well as human," believing that love of God required avoiding harm down to the "least creature." In the twentieth century, the historian Martin Ceadel observed that an "extraordinary affinity" had developed between pacifism and vegetarianism, rooted in a shared "unwillingness to take life." During the First World War, Quaker conscientious objector Allen Skinner nearly starved to death in prison rather than abandon his vegetarian diet.

Writing in 1988, Friend Vera Haley articulated the connection directly in what would be included in Quaker Faith and Practice (25:06): "I feel that being a vegetarian is a natural progression from being a pacifist and a Quaker." Vegetarianism has since been observed as a contemporary expression of both the peace and simplicity testimonies among modern Friends. Quaker Vegan Witness (QVW), founded in 2019, has continued this tradition by organising vegan witness activities within British Quaker communities and explicitly connecting the avoidance of violence toward non-human animals with the peace testimony.

Quaker Peace and Social Witness (QPSW), the principal peace body of Britain Yearly Meeting, works across issues including nonviolence, economic justice, environmental sustainability, criminal justice, and international peace-building. Since 2019, Quaker Roots (previously Roots of Resistance) has organised Quaker witness at the Defence and Security Equipment International (DSEI) arms fair in east London, explicitly framing its activism as an expression of the peace testimony. Living Witness organises the Earthcare Gathering, connecting Quaker ecological concern with the peace testimony; the Gathering was acknowledged in Britain Yearly Meeting's 2026 Epistle.

== See also ==
- List of peace activists
- Testimony of equality
- Testimony of integrity
- Testimony of simplicity
