= Mary Penington =

Mary Penington (1623–1682) was an English architect and one of the early members of the Religious Society of Friends (Quakers). She wrote an autobiography On Quakers, Medicine, and Property, that was discovered and published 40 years after her death. Penington took up architectural designing of buildings. She designed architectural structures and supervised their construction.

== Biography ==
Mary Penington was the only daughter of Sir John Proude, an army officer from Kent. She became an orphan at the age of three, and was taken into the care of Sir Edward Partridge, a bachelor; and lived with other guardians who (Mary later said) wanted for "religious rigour". Around the age of nine, Mary went to live with Partridge's widowed sister, a practising surgeon, Lady Katherine Springett. Katherine had three other children, including a son, Sir William Springett, whom Mary married at the age of 18. Contrary to the conventions of the day, they married without a ring. It appears the marriage was happy. Mary bore a son John; then while heavily pregnant with a second child, Mary heard that her husband, fighting on behalf of the Roundheads, was seriously ill following the recapture of Arundel from the Cavaliers. Sir William Springett had succumbed to a fever. Mary rushed to be with him, and managed to be with him briefly before he died on 3 February 1644. Their daughter was born within the week, and named Gulielma (after William) Maria Postuma. Mary did not baptise Gulielma, despite the heavy pressure that came from relatives and church ministers.

Mary was joined in running the household and raising her family by her mother-in-law Katherine Springett. They shared a strong friendship, and both had offers of marriage, but declined. Katherine taught Mary about managing her estates and inheritance. Mary and Gulielma also learned more about medicine from Katherine.

Mary continued to seek a true path for her religious beliefs though "wearied in seeking and not finding." She took up architectural designing of buildings. Mary designed architectural structures and supervised their construction.

In 1654, Mary met Isaac Penington. She was attracted to his religious viewpoints. They married the same year, and around the same time became Quakers. As a result, Penington's Chalfont Grange was seized, leaving them potentially bankrupt. Thanks to Mary's financial skills, the family stayed solvent, and Mary was able to purchase a house, enabling them to remain joined to the Chalfont St Peter Quaker meeting. Isaac was gaoled half a dozen times for offences including refusing to take an oath, and attending a Quaker meeting, which was forbidden.

Mary had five children with Penington. Her daughter by her first marriage, Gulielma, married William Penn.

Soon after Isaac's death in 1679, Mary went into decline. She died in 1680. Her diary has been cited as an excellent example of Quaker spiritual autobiographies.

== Sources ==
- Quakers in the World - Mary Penington
