= Quakers =

Christian religious movement

Religious Society of Friends
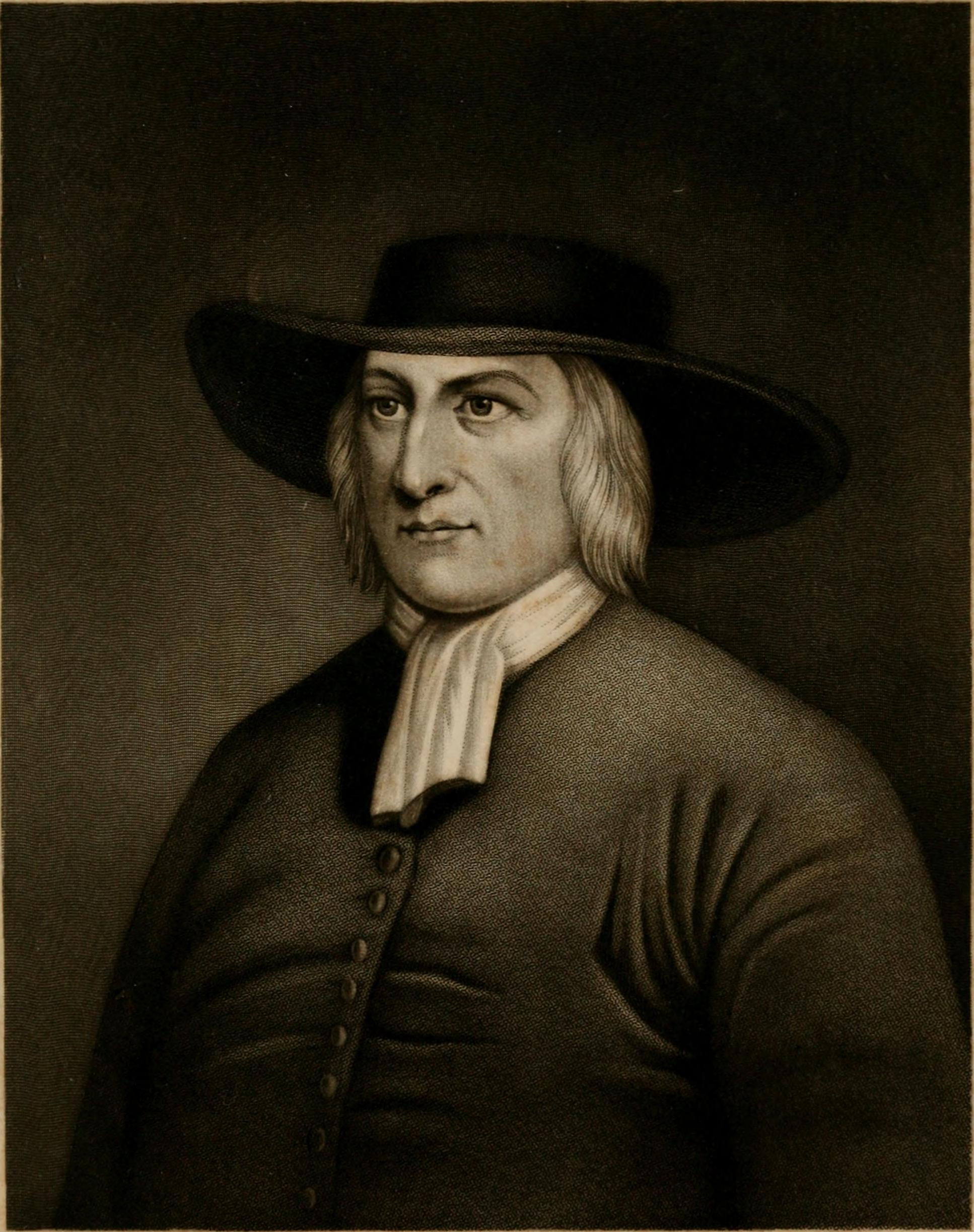
- George Fox, the principal early leader of the Quakers
- Scripture: Protestant Bible
- Theology: Variable; depends on meeting
- Distinct fellowships: Friends World Committee for Consultation
- Associations: Britain Yearly Meeting, Friends United Meeting, Evangelical Friends Church International, Conservative Friends, Friends General Conference
- Founder: George Fox; Margaret Fell
- Origin: Mid-17th century England
- Separated from: Church of England
- Separations: Shakers

Quakers are people who belong to the Religious Society of Friends, originally known as simply the Society of Friends, a historically Protestant Christian set of denominations. Members refer to each other as Friends after John 15:14 in the Bible. Originally, others referred to them as Quakers because the founder of the movement, George Fox, told a judge to "quake before the authority of God" along with their critics stating that they would shake or tremble while preaching.

The Friends are generally united by a belief in each human's ability to be guided by the inward light to "make the witness of God" known to everyone. Quakers have traditionally professed a priesthood of all believers inspired by the First Epistle of Peter. To differing extents, the Friends avoid creeds and hierarchical structures. They include those with evangelical, holiness, liberal, orthodox, independent, and traditional Quaker understandings of Christianity. Today, some Friends approach spirituality from a universalist perspective rooted in religious pluralism, occasionally practicing multiple religious belonging, while still others approach the faith from nontheist perspectives. In 2017, there were an estimated 377,557 adult Quakers, 49% of them in Africa followed by 22% in North America.

Some 11% of Quakers worldwide practice waiting worship or unprogrammed worship (commonly Meeting for Worship), where the unplanned order of service is mainly silent and may include unprepared vocal ministry from those present. This form of worship originated with the practices of George Fox and the early Friends, and is the dominant form in the United Kingdom, Canada, Australia, New Zealand, Southern Africa and parts of the United States. Some 40% of Quakers worldwide belong to the evangelical branch, which holds services with singing and a prepared Bible message coordinated by a pastor, with or without some period of silence. Their theology is largely consistent with evangelicalism framed in a Quaker context, and theirs is the dominant form of worship in most of Africa and parts of the United States, where it developed during the 19th Century in the context of the wider Second Great Awakening. Additionally, some 49% of worldwide Friends hold programmed or semi-programmed worship, which mix programmed elements such as hymns and readings with unprogrammed silence to varying degrees, but do not necessarily identify as evangelical.

The Christian movement dubbed Quakerism arose in mid-17th-century England from the Legatine-Arians and other dissenting Protestant groups breaking with the established Church of England (Anglicanism). The Quakers, especially the Valiant Sixty, sought to convert others by travelling through Britain and overseas preaching the Gospel; some early Quaker ministers were women. They based their message on a belief that "Christ has come to teach his people himself", stressing direct relations with God through Jesus Christ and belief in the universal priesthood of all believers. This personal religious experience of Christ was acquired by direct experience, as well as by reading and studying the Bible.

Friends focused their private lives on behaviour and speech reflecting emotional purity and the light of God, with a goal of Christian perfection. A prominent theological text of the Religious Society of Friends is A Catechism and Confession of Faith (1673), published by Quaker divine Robert Barclay. The Richmond Declaration of Faith (1887) was adopted by many Orthodox Friends and continues to serve as a doctrinal statement of many yearly meetings.

Quakers were known to wear plain dress, and to practice teetotalism. They refused to swear oaths or to participate in war, and they opposed slavery. Some Quakers founded banks and financial institutions, including Barclays, Lloyds, and Friends Provident; manufacturers including the footwear firm of Clarks and the big three British confectionery makers Cadbury, Rowntree and Fry; and philanthropic efforts, including abolition of slavery, prison reform, and social justice. In 1947, in recognition of their dedication to peace and the common good, Quakers represented by the British Friends Service Council and the American Friends Service Committee were awarded the Nobel Peace Prize.

== History ==
=== Beginnings in England ===
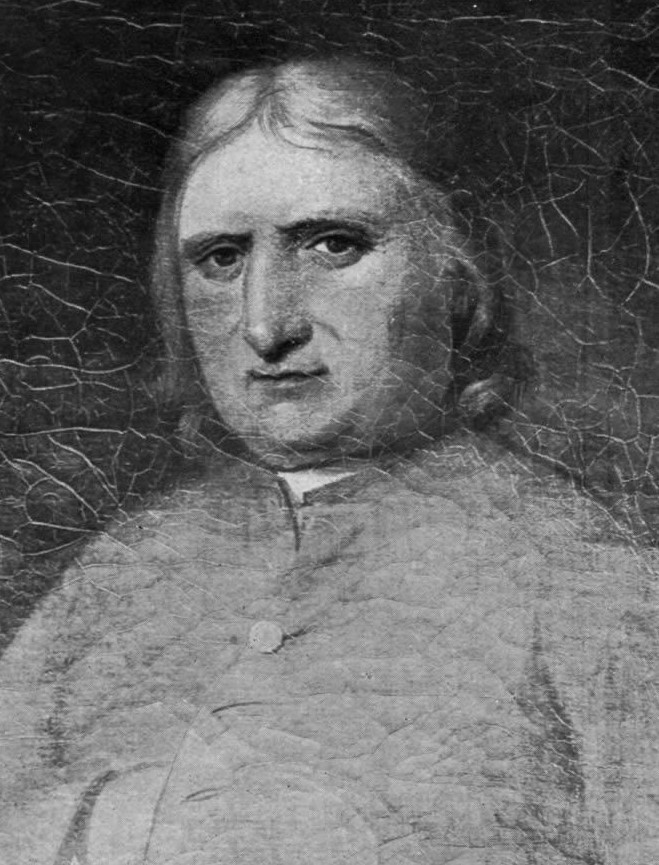
George Fox, a leading early Quaker

Religious strife in the Kingdom of England had existed for centuries, with proto-Protestant groups (mainly the Lollards) emerging before the English Reformation brought radical ideas to the mainstream. During and after the English Civil War (1642–1651) many dissenting Christian groups emerged, including the Seekers and others. A young man, George Fox, was dissatisfied with the teachings of the Church of England and nonconformists. Whilst living in Mansfield, Nottinghamshire in 1647, he claimed to have received a revelation that "there is one, even Christ Jesus, who can speak to thy condition", and became convinced that it was possible to have a direct experience of Christ without the aid of ordained clergy. In 1652 he had a vision on Pendle Hill in Lancashire, England, in which he believed that "the Lord let me see in what places he had a great people to be gathered". Following this he travelled around England, the Netherlands, and Barbados preaching and teaching with the aim of converting new adherents to his faith. The central theme of his Gospel message was that Jesus Christ was alive and has come to teach his people himself. Fox considered himself to be restoring a true, "pure" Christian church.

In 1650, Fox was brought before the magistrates Gervase Bennet and Nathaniel Barton, on a charge of religious blasphemy. According to Fox's autobiography, Bennet "was the first that called us Quakers, because I bade them tremble at the word of the Lord". It is thought that Fox was referring to Isaiah 66:2 or Ezra 9:4. Thus the name Quaker began as a way of ridiculing Fox's admonition, but became widely accepted and used by some Quakers. Quakers also described themselves using terms such as true Christianity, Saints, Children of the Light, and Friends of Truth, reflecting terms used in the New Testament by members of the early Christian church.

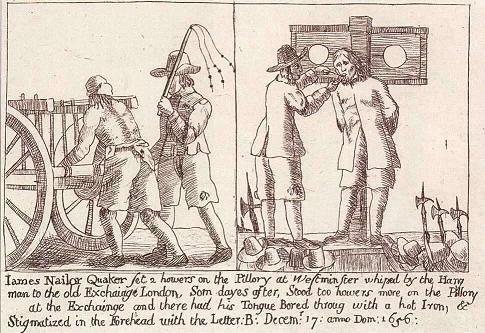
James Nayler, a prominent Quaker leader, being pilloried and whipped

Quakerism gained a considerable following in England and Wales, not least among women. An address "To the Reader" by Mary Forster accompanied a Petition to the Parliament of England presented on 20 May 1659, expressing the opposition of over 7000 women to "the oppression of Tithes". The overall number of Quakers increased to a peak of 60,000 in England and Wales by 1680 (1.15% of the population of England and Wales). But the dominant discourse of Protestantism viewed the Quakers as a blasphemous challenge to social and political order, leading to official persecution in England and Wales under the Quaker Act 1662 and the Conventicle Act 1664. This persecution of dissenters was relaxed after the Declaration of Indulgence (1687–1688) and stopped under the Act of Toleration 1689.

One modern view of Quakerism at this time was that the direct relationship with Christ was encouraged through spiritualisation of human relations, and "the redefinition of the Quakers as a holy tribe, 'the family and household of God'". Together with Margaret Fell, the wife of Thomas Fell, who was the vice-chancellor of the Duchy of Lancaster and an eminent judge, Fox developed new conceptions of family and community that emphasised "holy conversation": speech and behaviour that reflected piety, faith, and love. With the restructuring of the family and household came new roles for women; Fox and Fell viewed the Quaker mother as essential to developing "holy conversation" in her children and husband. Quaker women were also responsible for the spirituality of the larger community, coming together in "meetings" that regulated marriage and domestic behaviour.

=== Migration to North America ===
The persecution of Quakers in North America began in July 1656 when English Quaker missionaries Mary Fisher and Ann Austin began preaching in Boston. They were considered heretics because of their insistence on individual obedience to the Inward light. They were imprisoned in harsh conditions for five weeks and banished by the Massachusetts Bay Colony. Their books were burned, and most of their property confiscated.

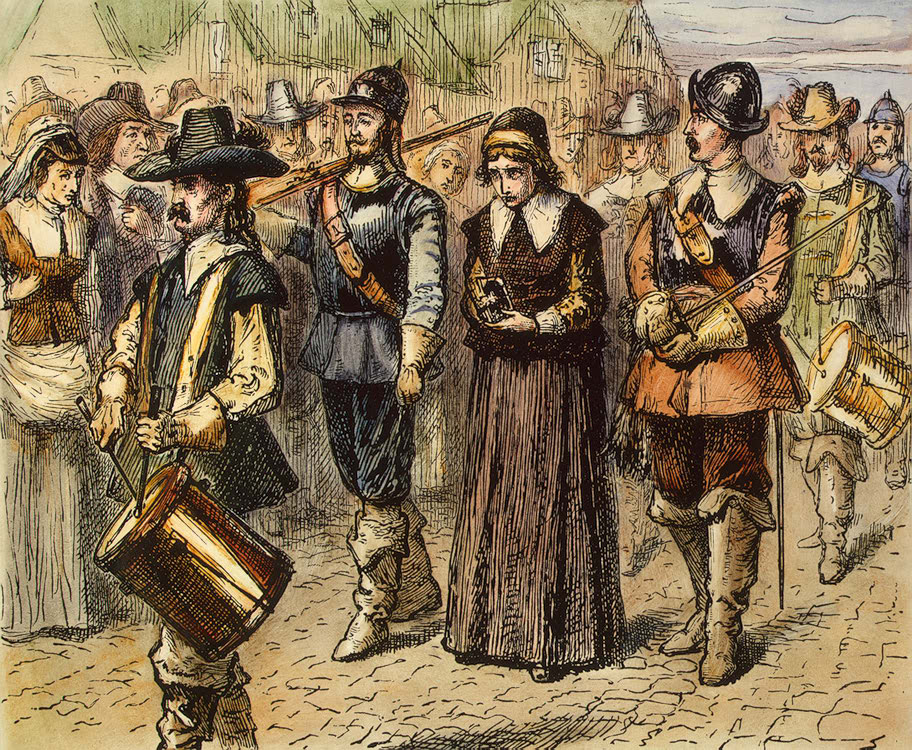
Quaker Mary Dyer led to execution on Boston Common, 1 June 1660.

In 1660, English Quaker Mary Dyer was hanged near Boston Common for repeatedly defying a Puritan law banning Quakers from the colony. She was one of the four executed Quakers known as the Boston martyrs. In 1661, King Charles II forbade Massachusetts from executing anyone for professing Quakerism. In 1684, England revoked the Massachusetts charter, sent over a royal governor to enforce English laws in 1686 and, in 1689, passed a broad Toleration Act.

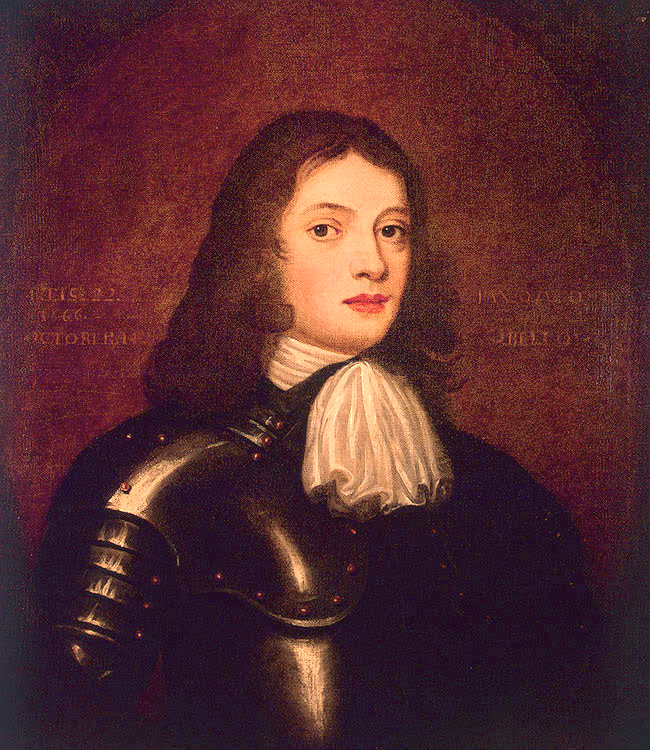
William Penn, the founder of Pennsylvania and West Jersey, as a young man

Some Friends migrated to what is now the north-eastern region of the United States in the 1660s in search of economic opportunities and a more tolerant environment in which to build communities of "holy conversation". In 1665 Quakers established a meeting in Shrewsbury, New Jersey (now Monmouth County), and built a meeting house in 1672 that was visited by George Fox in the same year. They were able to establish thriving communities in the Delaware Valley, although they continued to experience persecution in some areas, such as New England. The three colonies that tolerated Quakers at this time were West Jersey, Rhode Island, and Pennsylvania, where Quakers established themselves politically. In Rhode Island, 36 governors in the first 100 years were Quakers. West Jersey and Pennsylvania were established by affluent Quaker William Penn in 1676 and 1682 respectively, with Pennsylvania as an American commonwealth run under Quaker principles. William Penn signed a peace treaty with Tamanend, leader of the Lenape, and other treaties followed between Quakers and Native Americans. This peace endured almost a century, until the Penn's Creek Massacre of 1755. Early colonial Quakers also established communities and meeting houses in North Carolina and Maryland, after fleeing persecution by the Anglican Church in Virginia.

In a 2007 interview, author David Yount (How the Quakers Invented America) said that Quakers first introduced many ideas from England that later became mainstream, such as democracy in the Pennsylvania legislature, the Bill of Rights to the U.S. Constitution from Rhode Island Quakers, trial by jury, equal rights for men and women, and public education. The Liberty Bell was cast by Quakers in Philadelphia, Pennsylvania.

=== Quietism ===
Early Quakerism tolerated boisterous behaviour that challenged conventional etiquette; however, by 1700, its adherents no longer supported disruptive and unruly behaviour. During the 18th century, Quakers entered the Quietist period in the history of their church, becoming more inward-looking spiritually and less active in converting others. Marrying outside the Society was cause for having one's membership revoked. Numbers dwindled, dropping to 19,800 in England and Wales by 1800 (0.21% of the population), and 13,859 by 1860 (0.07% of population). The formal name "Religious Society of Friends" dates from this period and was probably derived from the appellations "Friends of the Light" and "Friends of Truth".

=== Splits ===
Divisions of the Religious Society of Friends

- - Orthodox
    - - - Gurneyite
          - Orthodox
            - Programmed (Pastoral)
              Friends United Meeting 1902 (US 25K, world 170K)
            - Evangelical 1924 (Pastoral)
              Evangelical Friends Church International 1947 (US 34K, world 200K)
          - Beanite 1889
            - . Independent (US 3K) (Unprogrammed)
              unaffiliated (US 1K)
        - Wilburite 1842
          - . Conservative (Unprogrammed)
            Conservative Friends 1842 (US 2K)
    - Beaconite (1836–1850s)
  - Hicksite (Liberal) 1827
    - (2019 + Beanite US 2K) . Unprogrammed
      Friends General Conference 1900 (US 22K, world 32K)

The divisions of Quakers 1800–1900s. Orthodox adopt "mainstream Protestant orthodoxy". Liberals value the Inner Light over the Bible. Conservatives want to conserve the Inner Light over outward evangelicalism. Late 1800s many meetings became programmed (pastoral) with splits by unprogrammed meetings. 2019 Beanite - 2 Yearly Meetings joined FGC, 1 YM remained unaffiliated. (US and world membership K=1,000. 49% in Africa)
WWI peace work brought the diverse Friends together in followship formalized with the Friends World Committee for Consultation in 1937.

Around the time of the American Revolutionary War, some American Quakers split from the main Society of Friends over issues such as support for the war, forming groups such as the Free Quakers and the Universal Friends. Later, in the 19th century, there was a diversification of theological beliefs in the Religious Society of Friends, and this led to several larger splits within the movement.

==== Hicksite–Orthodox split ====
The Hicksite–Orthodox split arose out of both ideological and socioeconomic tensions. Philadelphia Yearly Meeting Hicksites tended to be agrarian and poorer than the more urban, wealthier, Orthodox Quakers. With increasing financial success, Orthodox Quakers wanted to "make the Society a more respectable body – to transform their sect into a church – by adopting mainstream Protestant orthodoxy". Hicksites, though they held a variety of views, generally saw the market economy as corrupting, and believed Orthodox Quakers had sacrificed their orthodox Christian spirituality for material success. Hicksites viewed the Bible as secondary to the individual cultivation of God's light within.

With Gurneyite Quakers' shift toward Protestant principles and away from the spiritualisation of human relations, women's role as promoters of "holy conversation" started to decrease. Conversely, within the Hicksite movement the rejection of the market economy and the continuing focus on community and family bonds tended to encourage women to retain their role as powerful arbiters.

Elias Hicks's religious views were claimed to be universalist and to contradict Quakers' historical orthodox Christian beliefs and practices. Hicks' Gospel preaching and teaching precipitated the Great Separation of 1827, which resulted in a parallel system of Yearly Meetings in America, joined by Friends from Philadelphia, New York, Ohio, Indiana, and Baltimore. They were referred to by opponents as Hicksites and by others and sometimes themselves as Orthodox. Quakers in Britain recognised only the Orthodox Quakers and refused to correspond with the Hicksites.

==== Beaconite controversy ====
Isaac Crewdson was a Recorded Minister in Manchester. His 1835 book A Beacon to the Society of Friends insisted that the inner light was at odds with a religious belief in salvation by the atonement of Christ. This Christian controversy led to Crewdson's resignation from the Religious Society of Friends, along with 48 fellow members of Manchester Meeting and about 250 other British Quakers in 1836–1837. Some of these joined the Plymouth Brethren.

==== Rise of Gurneyite Quakerism, and the Gurneyite–Conservative split ====
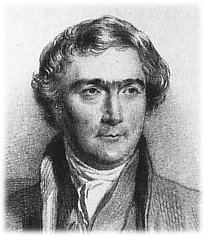
Joseph John Gurney was a prominent 19th-century British Friend and a strong proponent of evangelical views.

Orthodox Friends became more evangelical during the 19th century and were influenced by the Second Great Awakening. This movement was led by British Quaker Joseph John Gurney. Christian Friends held Revival meetings in America and became involved in the Holiness movement of churches. Quakers such as Hannah Whitall Smith and Robert Pearsall Smith became speakers in the religious movement and introduced Quaker phrases and practices to it. British Friends became involved with the Higher Life movement, with Robert Wilson from the Cockermouth meeting founding the Keswick Convention. From the 1870s it became common in Britain to have "home mission meetings" on Sunday evening with Christian hymns and a Bible-based sermon, alongside the silent meetings for worship on Sunday morning.

The Quaker Yearly Meetings supporting the religious beliefs of Joseph John Gurney were known as Gurneyite yearly meetings. Many eventually collectively became the Five Years Meeting (FYM) and then the Friends United Meeting, although London Yearly Meeting, which had been strongly Gurneyite in the 19th century, did not join either of these. In 1924, the Central Yearly Meeting of Friends, a Gurneyite yearly meeting, was started by some Friends who left the Five Years Meeting due to a concern of what they saw as the allowance of modernism in the FYM.

Some Orthodox Quakers in America disliked the move towards evangelical Christianity and saw it as a dilution of Friends' traditional orthodox Christian belief in being inwardly led by the Holy Spirit. These Friends were headed by John Wilbur, who was expelled from his yearly meeting in 1842. He and his supporters formed their own Conservative Friends Yearly Meeting. Some UK Friends broke away from the London Yearly Meeting for the same reason in 1865. They formed a separate body of Friends called Fritchley General Meeting, which remained distinct and separate from London Yearly Meeting until 1968. Similar splits took place in Canada. The Yearly Meetings that supported John Wilbur's religious beliefs became known as Conservative Friends.

=== Richmond Declaration ===
In 1887, a Gurneyite Quaker of British descent, Joseph Bevan Braithwaite, proposed to Friends a statement of faith known as the Richmond Declaration. Supported by many of the older, longstanding members in the London Yearly Meeting, Braithwaite saw the Richmond Declaration of Faith as being a bulwark against "unsound and dangerous doctrine" in times when Friends were "in a state of discipline and warfare". This statement of faith was agreed to by 95 of the representatives at a meeting of Five Years Meeting Friends, but unexpectedly the Richmond Declaration was not adopted by London Yearly Meeting because a vocal minority, including Edward Grubb, opposed it.

Fifteen years after the signing on the Richmond Declaration, Five Years Meeting was established in 1902 by a collection of orthodox yearly meetings. In 1963 Five Years Meeting was renamed Friends United Meeting.

=== Missions to Asia and Africa ===
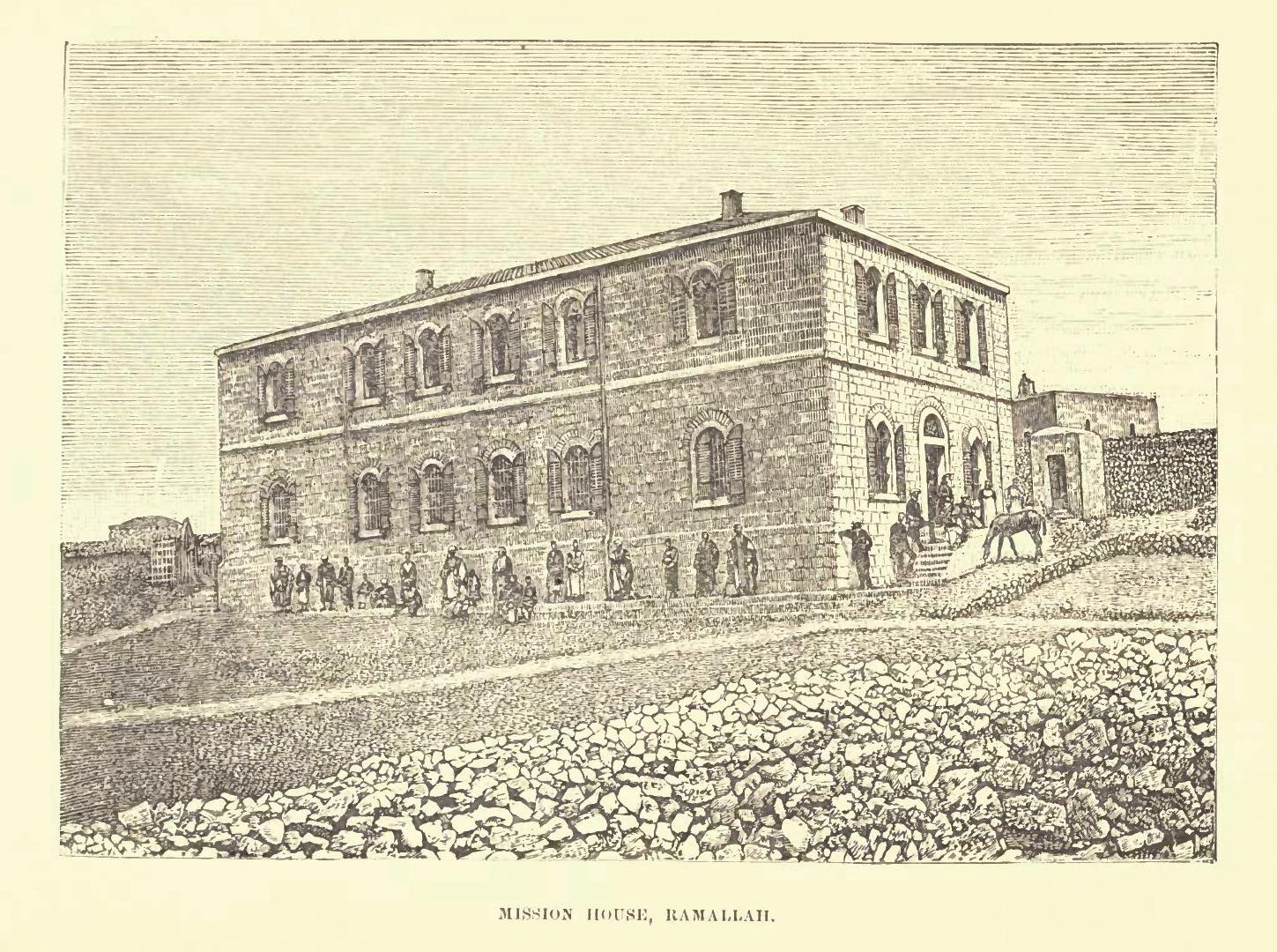
Friends' Syrian Mission, 1874, built this mission house in Ramallah.

Following the Christian revivals in the mid-19th century, Friends in Great Britain sought also to start missionary activity overseas. The first missionaries were sent to Benares (Varanasi), in India, in 1866. The Friends Foreign Mission Association was formed in 1868 and sent missionaries to Madhya Pradesh, India, forming what is now the Mid-India Yearly Meeting. Later it spread to Madagascar from 1867, China from 1896, Sri Lanka from 1896, and Pemba Island from 1897.

After the 1860 civil conflict in Mount Lebanon and Damascus between Christians and Druze, many missionaries flocked to Ottoman Syria. These missionaries included Friends from several nations. The Friends Syrian Mission was established in 1874, which among other institutions ran the Ramallah Friends School in the West Bank, which still exist today and is affiliated with the Friends United Meeting. The Swiss missionary Theophilus Waldmeier founded Brummana High School in Lebanon in 1873.

Evangelical Friends Churches from Ohio Yearly Meeting sent missionaries to India in 1896, forming what is now Bundelkhand Yearly Meeting.

Cleveland Friends went to Mombasa, Kenya, and started what became the most successful Friends' mission. Their Quakerism spread within Kenya and to Uganda, Tanzania, Burundi, and Rwanda.

=== Theory of evolution ===
The theory of evolution as described in Charles Darwin's On the Origin of Species (1859) was opposed by many Quakers in the 19th century, particularly by older evangelical Quakers who dominated the Religious Society of Friends in Great Britain. These older Quakers were suspicious of Darwin's theory and believed that natural selection could not explain life on its own. The influential Quaker scientist Edward Newman said that the theory was "not compatible with our notions of creation as delivered from the hands of a Creator".

However, some young Friends such as John Wilhelm Rowntree and Edward Grubb supported Darwin's theories, using the doctrine of progressive revelation. In the United States, Joseph Moore taught the theory of evolution at the Quaker Earlham College as early as 1861. This made him one of the first teachers to do so in the Midwest. Acceptance of the theory of evolution became more widespread in Yearly Meetings who moved toward liberal Christianity in the 19th and 20th centuries. However, creationism predominates within evangelical Friends Churches, particularly in East Africa and parts of the United States.

=== Quaker Renaissance ===
In the late 19th century and early 20th century, the so-called Quaker Renaissance movement began within London Yearly Meeting. Young Friends in London Yearly Meeting at this time moved away from evangelicalism and towards liberal Christianity. This movement was particularly influenced by Rowntree, Grubb, and Rufus Jones. Such Liberal Friends promoted the theory of evolution, modern biblical criticism, and the social meaning of Christ's teaching – encouraging Friends to follow the New Testament example of Christ by performing good works. These men downplayed the evangelical Quaker belief in the atonement of Christ on the Cross at Calvary. After the Manchester Conference in England in 1895, one thousand British Friends met to consider the future of British Quakerism, and as a result, Liberal Quaker thought gradually increased within the London Yearly Meeting.

=== Conscientious objection ===
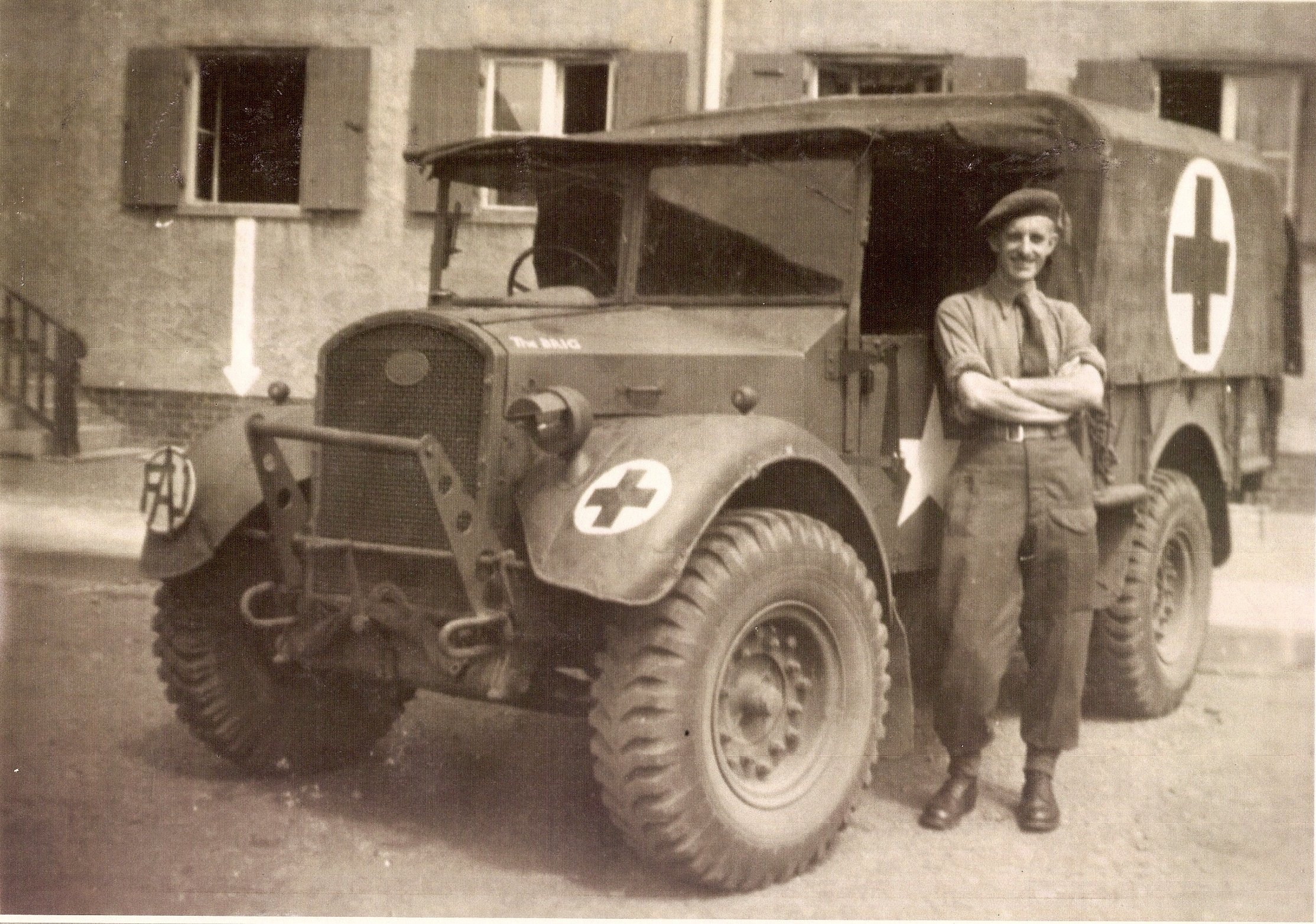
Friends' Ambulance Unit (FAU), a volunteer service founded by British Quakers, with a FAU ambulance and driver pictured in Germany in 1945

Formal legislation to exempt conscientious objectors from fighting was first granted in Great Britain in 1757 when Quakers were given exemption from military service, which was a milestone in freedom of conscience.

During World War I and World War II, Friends' opposition to war was put to the test. Many Friends became conscientious objectors and some in Britain formed the Friends Ambulance Unit, aiming at "co-operating with others to build up a new world rather than fighting to destroy the old", as did the American Friends Service Committee. Birmingham in England had a strong Quaker community during the war. Many British Quakers were conscripted into the Non-Combatant Corps during both world wars.

=== World Committee for Consultation ===
After the two world wars had brought the different Quaker strands closer together, Friends from different yearly meetings – many having served together in the Friends Ambulance Unit or the American Friends Service Committee, or in other relief work – later held several Quaker World Conferences. This brought about a standing body of Friends: the Friends World Committee for Consultation.

=== Evangelical Friends ===
A growing desire for a more fundamentalist approach among some Friends after the First World War began a split among Five Years Meetings. In 1924, the Central Yearly Meeting of Friends was started by some Friends who left the Five Years Meeting. In 1926, Oregon Yearly Meeting seceded from the Five Years Meeting, bringing together several other yearly meetings and scattered monthly meetings.

In 1947, the Association of Evangelical Friends was formed, with triennial meetings until 1970. In 1965, this was replaced by the Evangelical Friends Alliance, which in 1989 became Evangelical Friends Church International.

=== Role of women ===
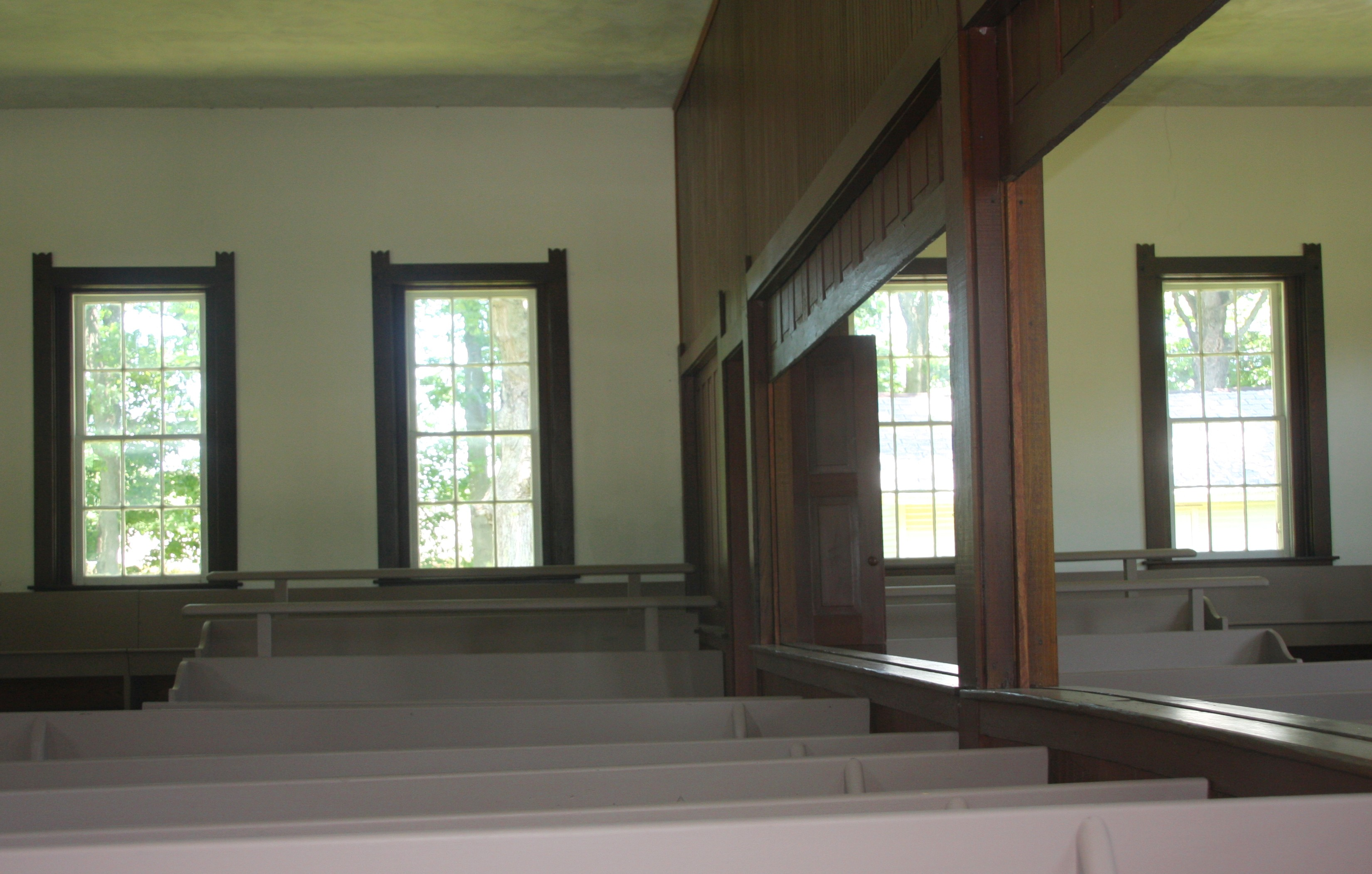
Sugar Grove Conservative Friends Meeting House, built in 1870 in Indiana, with an openable partition between male and female sections

In the 1650s, individual Quaker women prophesied and preached publicly, developing charismatic personae and spreading the sect. This practice was bolstered by the movement's firm concept of spiritual equality for men and women. Moreover, Quakerism initially was propelled by the nonconformist behaviours of its followers, especially women who broke from social norms. By the 1660s, the movement had gained a more structured organisation, which led to separate women's meetings. Through the women's meetings, women oversaw domestic and community life, including marriage. From the beginning, Quaker women, notably Margaret Fell, played an important role in defining Quakerism. They were involved in missionary work in various ways and places. Early Quaker women missionaries included Sarah Cheevers and Katharine Evans. Others active in proselytising included Mary Penington, Mary Mollineux and Barbara Blaugdone. Quaker women published at least 220 texts during the 17th century. However, some Quakers resented the power of women in the community.

In the early years of Quakerism, George Fox faced resistance in developing and establishing women's meetings. As controversy increased, Fox did not fully adhere to his agenda. For example, he established the London Six Weeks Meeting in 1671 as a regulatory body, led by 35 women and 49 men. Even so, conflict culminated in the Wilkinson–Story split, in which a portion of the Quaker community left to worship independently in protest at women's meetings. After several years, this schism became largely resolved, testifying to the resistance of some within the Quaker community and to the spiritual role of women that Fox and Margaret Fell had encouraged. Particularly within the relatively prosperous Quaker communities of the eastern United States, the focus on the child and "holy conversation" gave women unusual community power, although they were largely excluded from the market economy. With the Hicksite–Orthodox split of 1827–1828, Orthodox women found their spiritual role decreased, while Hicksite women retained greater influence.

According to Quakers In The World, "The Women's Suffrage Movement in the USA is widely considered to date from the First Women's Rights Convention, held in Seneca Falls, New York State in 1848. This meeting was instigated by five women who had been closely involved in the abolition of slavery, all but one of whom were Quakers."

=== Friends in business and education ===
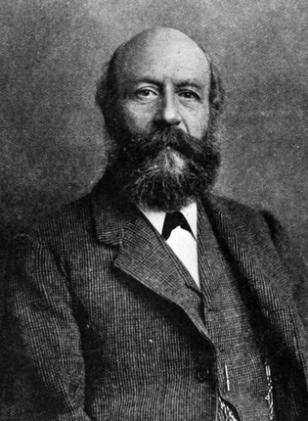
English Quaker John Cadbury founded Cadbury in Birmingham, England, in 1824, selling tea, coffee and drinking chocolate.

Described as "natural capitalists" by the BBC, many Quakers were successful in a variety of industries. Two notable examples were Abraham Darby I and Edward Pease. Darby and his family played an important role in the Industrial Revolution in Britain with their innovations in ironmaking. Pease, a Darlington manufacturer, was the main promoter of the Stockton and Darlington Railway, which was the world's first public railway to use steam locomotives.

Other UK industries with prominent Quaker businesses included banking (Lloyds Banking Group and Barclays PLC), pharmaceuticals (Allen & Hanburys), chocolate (Cadbury and Fry's), confectionery (Rowntree), shoe manufacturing (Clarks), and biscuit manufacturing (Huntley & Palmers), while in the US the retailer Macy's was founded by Quakers. Voltaire's Letters on the English (1733) included the spirit of commerce and religious diversity in Great Britain, with the first four letters based on the Quakers.

Quakers have a long history of establishing educational institutions. Initially, Quakers had no ordained clergy, and therefore needed no seminaries for theological training. In England, Quaker schools sprang up soon after the movement emerged, with Friends School Saffron Walden being the most prominent. Quaker schools in the UK and Ireland are supported by The Friends' Schools' Council. In Australia, Friends' School, Hobart, founded in 1887, has grown into the largest Quaker school in the world. In the UK and the US, friends have established a variety of institutions at a variety of educational levels. In Kenya, Quakers founded several primary and secondary schools in the first half of the 20th century before the country's independence in 1963.

=== International development ===
International volunteering organisations such as Service Civil International and International Voluntary Service were founded by leading Quakers. Eric Baker, a prominent Quaker, was one of the founders of Amnesty International and of the Campaign for Nuclear Disarmament.

The Quaker Edith Pye established a national Famine Relief Committee in May 1942, encouraging a network of local famine relief committees, among the most energetic of which was the Oxford Committee for Famine Relief, Oxfam. Irving and Dorothy Stowe co-founded Greenpeace with many other environmental activists in 1971, shortly after becoming Quakers.

=== Friends and slavery ===
Some Quakers in America and Britain became known for their involvement in the abolitionist movement. In the early history of Colonial America, it was fairly common for Friends to own slaves, e.g. in Pennsylvania. During the early to mid-1700s, disquiet about this practice arose among Friends, best exemplified by the testimonies of Benjamin Lay, Anthony Benezet and John Woolman, and this resulted in an abolition movement among Friends.

Nine of the twelve founding members of the Society for Effecting the Abolition of the Slave Trade, or The Society for the Abolition of the Slave Trade, were Quakers: John Barton (1755–1789); William Dillwyn (1743–1824); George Harrison (1747–1827); Samuel Hoare Jr (1751–1825); Joseph Hooper (1732–1789); John Lloyd; Joseph Woods Sr (1738–1812); James Phillips (1745–1799); and Richard Phillips. Five of the Quakers had been amongst the informal group of six Quakers who had pioneered the movement in 1783, when the first petition against the slave trade was presented to Parliament. As Quakers could not serve as Members of Parliament, they relied on the help of Anglican men who could, such as William Wilberforce and his brother-in-law James Stephen.

By the beginning of the American Revolutionary War, few Friends owned slaves. At the war's end in 1783, Yarnall family members along with fellow Meeting House Friends made a failed petition to the Continental Congress to abolish slavery in the United States. In 1790, the Society of Friends petitioned the United States Congress to abolish slavery.

One example of a reversal in sentiment about slavery took place in the life of Moses Brown, one of four Rhode Island brothers who, in 1764, organized and funded the tragic and fateful voyage of the slave ship Sally. Brown broke away from his three brothers, became an abolitionist, and converted to Christian Quakerism. During the 19th century, Quakers such as Levi Coffin and Isaac Hopper played a major role in helping enslaved people escape through the Underground Railroad. Black Quaker Paul Cuffe, a sea captain and businessman, was active in the abolitionist and resettlement movement in the early part of that century. Quaker Laura Smith Haviland, with her husband, established the first station on the Underground Railroad in Michigan. Later, Haviland befriended Sojourner Truth, who called her the Superintendent of the Underground Railroad.

However, in the 1830s, the abolitionist Grimké sisters dissociated themselves from the Quakers "when they saw that Negro Quakers were segregated in separate pews in the Philadelphia meeting house".

== Theology ==
Quakers' theological beliefs vary considerably. Tolerance of dissent widely varies among yearly meetings. Most Friends believe in continuing revelation: that God continuously reveals truth directly to individuals. George Fox, an "early Friend", said, "Christ has come to teach His people Himself". Friends often focus on trying to feel the presence of God. As Isaac Penington wrote in 1670, "It is not enough to hear of Christ, or read of Christ, but this is the thing – to feel him to be my root, my life, and my foundation..." Quakers reject the idea of priests, believing in the priesthood of all believers. Some express their concept of God using phrases such as "the inner light", "inward light of Christ", or "Holy Spirit".

Diverse theological beliefs, understandings of the "leading of the Holy Spirit", and statements of "faith and practice" have always existed among Friends. Due in part to the emphasis on immediate guidance of the Holy Spirit, Quaker doctrines have only at times been codified as statements of faith, confessions or theological texts. Those that exist include the Letter to the Governor of Barbados (Fox, 1671), An Apology for the True Christian Divinity (Barclay, 1678), A Catechism and Confession of Faith (Barclay, 1690), The Testimony of the Society of Friends on the Continent of America (adopted jointly by all Orthodox yearly meetings in the United States, 1830), the Richmond Declaration of Faith (adopted by Five Years Meeting, 1887), and Essential Truths (Jones and Wood, adopted by Five Years Meeting, 1922). Most yearly meetings make a public statement of faith in their own Book of Discipline, expressing Christian discipleship within the experience of Friends in that yearly meeting.

=== Conservatives ===
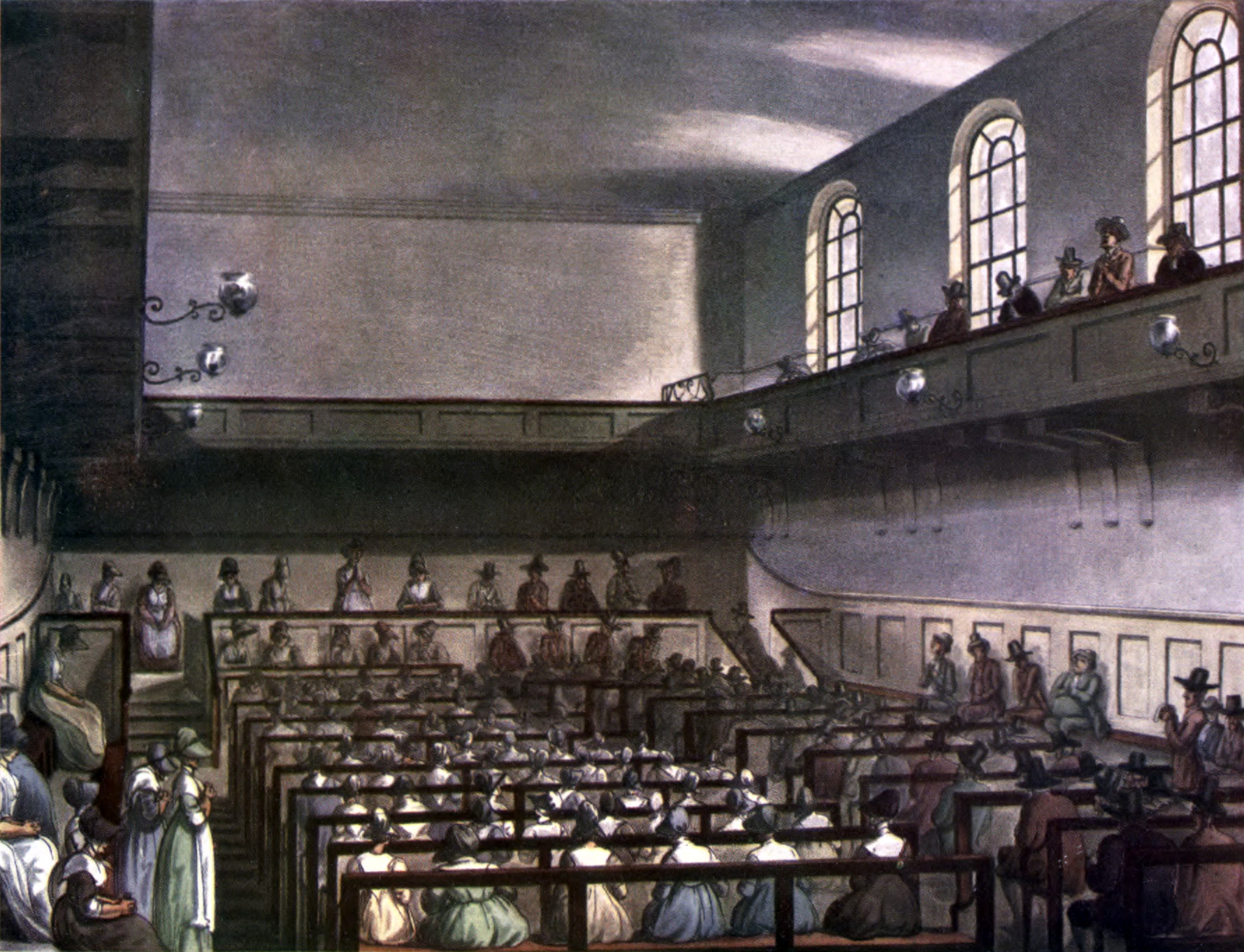
Conservative Friends worshipping in London in 1809. Friends are in traditional plain dress. At the front of the meeting house, the Recorded Ministers sit on a raised ministers' gallery facing the rest of the meeting, with the elders sitting on the bench in front of them, also facing the meeting. Men and women are segregated, but both are able to minister.

Conservative Friends (also known as "Wilburites" after their founder, John Wilbur), share some of the beliefs of Fox and the Early Friends. Many Wilburites see themselves as the Quakers whose beliefs are truest to original Quaker doctrine, arguing that the majority of Friends "broke away" from the Wilburites in the 19th and 20th centuries (rather than vice versa). Conservative Friends place their trust in the immediate guidance of God. They reject all forms of religious symbolism and outward sacraments, such as the Eucharist and water baptism. Conservative Friends do not rely on the practice of outward rites and sacraments in their living relationship with God through Christ, believing that holiness can exist in all of the activities of one's daily life – and that all of life is sacred in God. Many believe that a meal held with others can become a form of communion with God and with one another.

Conservative Friends in the United States are part of three small Quaker Yearly Meetings in Ohio, North Carolina, and Iowa. Ohio Yearly Meeting (Conservative) is generally considered the most Bible-centred of the three, retaining Christian Quakers who use plain language, wear plain dress, and are more likely to live in villages or rural areas than the Conservative Friends from their other two Yearly Meetings.

In 2007, total membership of such Yearly Meetings was around 1,642, making them around 0.4% of the world family of Quakers.

=== Evangelical ===
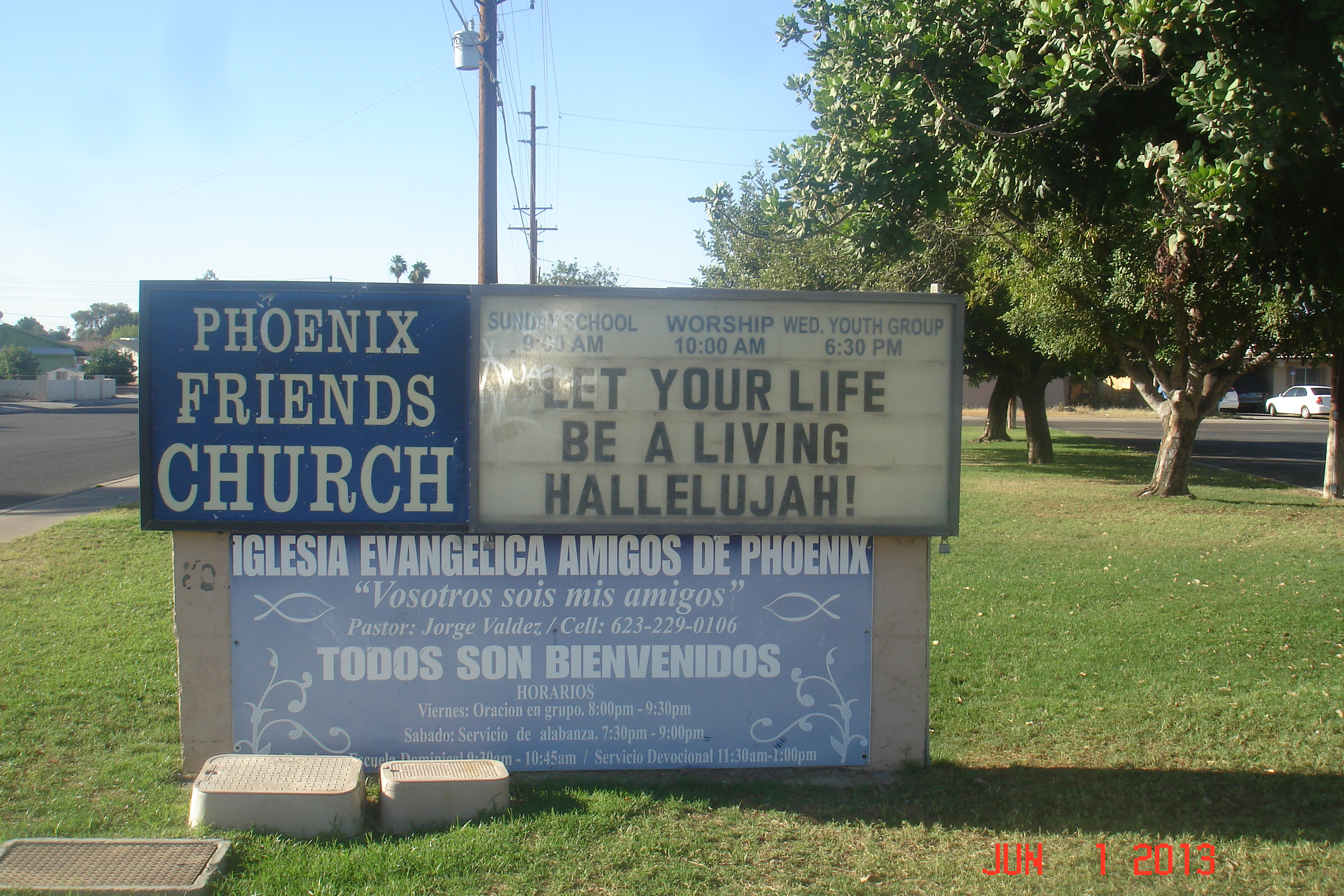
Sign at entrance of Phoenix Friends Church

Evangelical Friends regard Jesus Christ as their personal Lord and Saviour, and have similar religious beliefs to other evangelical Christians. They believe in and hold high regard for penal substitution of the atonement of Christ on the Cross at Calvary, biblical infallibility, and the need for all to experience a relationship with God personally. They believe that the Evangelical Friends Church is intended to evangelise the unsaved of the world, to transform them spiritually through God's love and through social service to others. They regard the Bible as God's infallible, self-authenticating Word. The statement of faith of Evangelical Friends International is comparable to that of other Evangelical churches. Those who are members of Evangelical Friends International are mainly located in the United States, Central America, and Asia.

Beginning in the 1880s, some Friends began using outward sacraments in their Sunday services, first in Evangelical Friends Church–Eastern Region (then known as Ohio Yearly Meeting [Damascus]). Friends Church–Southwest Region also approved such a practice. In places where Evangelical Friends engage in missionary work, such as Africa, Latin America, and Asia, adult baptism by immersion in water occurs. They differ from most other branches of the Religious Society of Friends. EFCI in 2014 was claiming to represent more than 140,000 Friends, some 39% of the total number of Friends worldwide.

=== Gurneyites ===
Gurneyite Friends (also known as Friends United Meeting Friends) are modern followers of the Evangelical Quaker theology specified by Joseph John Gurney, a 19th-century British Friend. They make up 49% of the total number of Quakers worldwide. They see Jesus Christ as their Teacher and Lord and favour close work with other Protestant Christian churches. Gurneyite Friends balance the Bible's authority as inspired words of God with personal, direct experience of God in their lives. Both children and adults participate in religious education, which emphasises orthodox Christian teaching from the Bible in relation to both orthodox Christian Quaker history and Quaker testimonies. Gurneyite Friends subscribe to a set of orthodox Christian doctrines, such as those found in the Richmond Declaration of faith. In later years, conflict arose among Gurneyite Friends over the Richmond Declaration of Faith, but after a while, it was adopted by nearly all of Gurneyite's yearly meetings. The Five Years Meeting of Friends reaffirmed its loyalty to the Richmond Declaration of Faith in 1912 but specified that it was not to constitute a Christian creed. Although Gurneyism was the main form of Quakerism in 19th-century Britain, Gurneyite Friends today are also found in America, Ireland, Africa, and India. Many Gurneyite Friends combine "waiting" (unprogrammed) worship with practices commonly found in other Protestant Christian churches, such as readings from the Bible and singing hymns. A small minority of Gurneyite Friends practice wholly unprogrammed worship.

=== Holiness ===
Holiness Friends are Quakers of the Gurneyite branch who are heavily influenced by the Holiness movement, in particular, the doctrine of Christian perfection, also called "entire sanctification". This states that loving God and humanity totally, as exemplified by Christ, enables believers to rid themselves of voluntary sin. This dominant view within Quakerism in the United Kingdom and the United States in the 19th century influenced other branches of Quakerism. Holiness Friends argue, leaning on writings that include George Fox's message of perfection, that the early Friends had this understanding of holiness.

Today, many Friends hold holiness beliefs within most yearly meetings, but it is the predominant theological view of Central Yearly Meeting of Friends, (founded in 1926 specifically to promote holiness theology) and the Holiness Mission of the Bolivian Evangelical Friends Church (founded by missionaries from that meeting in 1919, the largest group of Friends in Bolivia).

=== Liberal ===
Liberal Quakerism generally refers to Friends who take ideas from liberal Christianity, often sharing a similar mix of ideas, such as more critical Biblical hermeneutics, often with a focus on the social gospel. The ideas of that of God in everyone and the inner light were popularised by the American Friend Rufus Jones in the early 20th century, he and John Wilhelm Rowntree originating the movement. Liberal Friends predominated in Britain in the 20th century, among US meetings affiliated to Friends General Conference, and some meetings in Canada, Europe, Australia, New Zealand, and Southern Africa.

These ideas remain important in Liberal Friends' understanding of God. They highlight the importance of good works, particularly living a life that upholds the virtues preached by Jesus. They often emphasise pacifism, treating others equally, living simply, and telling the truth.

Like Conservative Friends, Liberal Friends reject religious symbolism and sacraments such as water baptism and the Eucharist. While Liberal Friends recognise the potential of these outward forms for awakening experiences of the Inward Light of Christ, they are not part of their worship and are thought unnecessary to authentic Christian spirituality.

The Bible remains central to most Liberal Friends' worship. Almost all meetings make it available in the meeting house, often on a table in the centre of the room, which attendees may read privately or publicly during worship. But Liberal Friends decided that the Scriptures should give way to God's lead if God leads them in a way contrary to the Bible. Many Friends are also influenced by liberal Christian theologians and modern Biblical criticism. They often adopt non-propositional Biblical hermeneutics, such as believing that the Bible is an anthology of human authors' beliefs and feelings about God rather than the Holy Writ and that multiple interpretations of the Scriptures are acceptable.

Liberal Friends believe that a corporate confession of faith would be an obstacle to authentic listening and new insight. As a non-creed form of Christianity, Liberal Quakerism is receptive to a wide range of understandings of religion. Most Liberal Quaker Yearly Meetings publish a Faith and Practice containing a range of religious experiences of what it means to be a Friend in that Yearly Meeting.

=== Universalist ===
Some Friends are Universalist Friends and affirm religious pluralism: there are many different paths to God and understandings of the divine reached through non-Christian religious experiences, which are as valid as Christian understandings. The group was founded in the late 1970s by John Linton, who had worshipped with the Delhi Worship Group in India (an independent meeting unaffiliated to any yearly meeting or wider Quaker group) with Christians, Muslims, and Hindus worshipping together.

After moving to Britain, Linton founded the Quaker Universalist Fellowship in 1978. Later, his views spread to the United States, where the Quaker Universalist Fellowship was founded in 1983. Most of the Friends who joined these two fellowships were Liberal Friends from the Britain Yearly Meeting in the United Kingdom and Friends General Conference in the United States. Interest in Quaker Universalism is low among Friends from other Yearly meetings. The views of the Universalists provoked controversy in the 1980s among themselves and Christian Quakers within the Britain Yearly Meeting and within the Friends General Conference. Despite the label, Quaker Universalists are not necessarily Christian Universalists, embracing the doctrine of universal reconciliation.

=== Non-theists ===
A minority of Friends have views similar to post-Christian non-theists in other churches, such as the Sea of Faith, which emerged from the Anglican church. They are predominantly atheists, agnostics, and humanists who still value membership in a religious organization. The first organisation for non-theist Friends was the Humanistic Society of Friends, founded in Los Angeles in 1939. This remained small and was absorbed into the American Humanist Association. Interest in non-theism resurfaced, particularly under the British Friend David Boulton, who founded the 40-member Nontheist Friends Network in 2011. Non-theism is controversial, leading some Christian Quakers from within Britain Yearly Meeting to call for non-theists to be denied membership.

In one study of Friends in the Britain Yearly Meeting, some 30% of Quakers had views described as non-theistic, agnostic, or atheist. Another study found that 75.1% of the 727 members of the Religious Society of Friends who completed the survey said that they consider themselves to be Christian and 17.6% that they did not, while 7.3% either did not answer or circled both answers. A further 22% of Quakers did not consider themselves Christian but fulfilled a definition of being a Christian in that they said that they devoutly followed the teachings and example of Jesus Christ. In the same survey, 86.9% said they believed in God.

== Practical theology ==
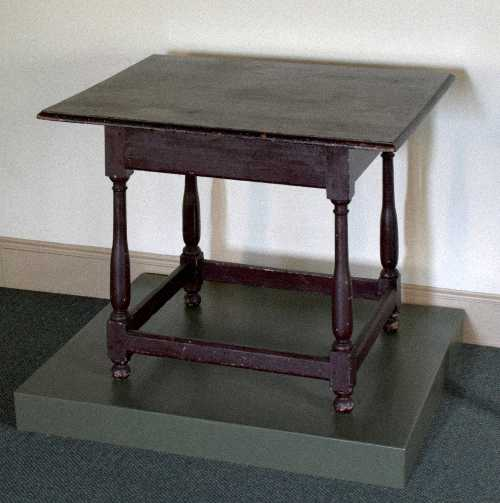
In 1688, at this table in Germantown, Philadelphia, Quakers and Mennonites signed a common declaration denouncing slavery.

Quakers bear witness or "testify" to their religious beliefs in their spiritual lives, drawing on the Epistle of James exhortation that "faith by itself, if it is not accompanied by action, is dead". This religious witness is rooted in their immediate experience of God and verified by the Bible, especially in Jesus Christ's life and teachings. They may bear witness in many ways, according to how they believe God is leading them. Although Quakers share how they relate to God and the world, mirroring Christian ethical codes, for example the Sermon on the Mount or the Sermon on the Plain, Friends argue that they feel personally moved by God rather than following an ethical code.

Some theologians classify Friends' religious witness into categories, known by some Friends as "testimonies". These Friends believe these principles and practices testify to, witness to, or provide evidence for God's truth. No categorisation is universally accepted.

In the United Kingdom, the acronym STEPS is sometimes used (simplicity, truth, equality, peace, and sustainability) to help remember the testimonies, although most Quakers just use the full words. In his book Quaker Speak, British Friend Alastair Heron, lists the following testimonies of common practical values in Quaker belief: integrity (or truth), peace, penal reform, plain language, relief of suffering, simplicity, social order, Sunday observance, sustainability, temperance and moderation; and opposition to the following: betting and gambling, capital punishment, conscription, hat-honour (the largely historical practice of dipping one's hat toward social superiors), oaths, slavery, times and seasons, and tithing.

In East Africa, Friends teach peace and nonviolence, simplicity, honesty, equality, humility, marriage and sexual ethics (defining marriage as lifelong between one man and one woman), sanctity of life (opposition to abortion), cultural conflicts and Christian life.

In the United States, the acronym SPICES is often used in many yearly meetings (simplicity, peace, integrity, community, equality, and stewardship). Stewardship is not recognised as a testimony in all yearly meetings, and some meetings have begun to replace it with the word service instead of stewardship because of its connotations with hierarchical control. Rocky Mountain Yearly Meeting Friends put their faith in action through living their lives by the following principles: prayer, personal integrity, stewardship (which includes giving away minimum of 10% income and refraining from lotteries), marriage and family (lifelong commitment), regard for mind and body (refraining from certain amusements, propriety and modesty of dress, abstinence from alcohol, tobacco and drugs), peace and nonviolence (including refusing to participate in war), abortion (opposition to abortion, practical ministry to women with unwanted pregnancy and promotion of adoption), human sexuality, the Christian and state (look to God for authority, not the government), capital punishment (find alternatives), human equality, women in ministry (recognising women and men have an equal part to play in ministry). The Southern Appalachian Yearly Meeting and Association lists as testimonies integrity, peace, simplicity, equality, and community; areas of witness include children, education, government, sexuality, and harmony with nature.

=== Calendar and church holidays ===
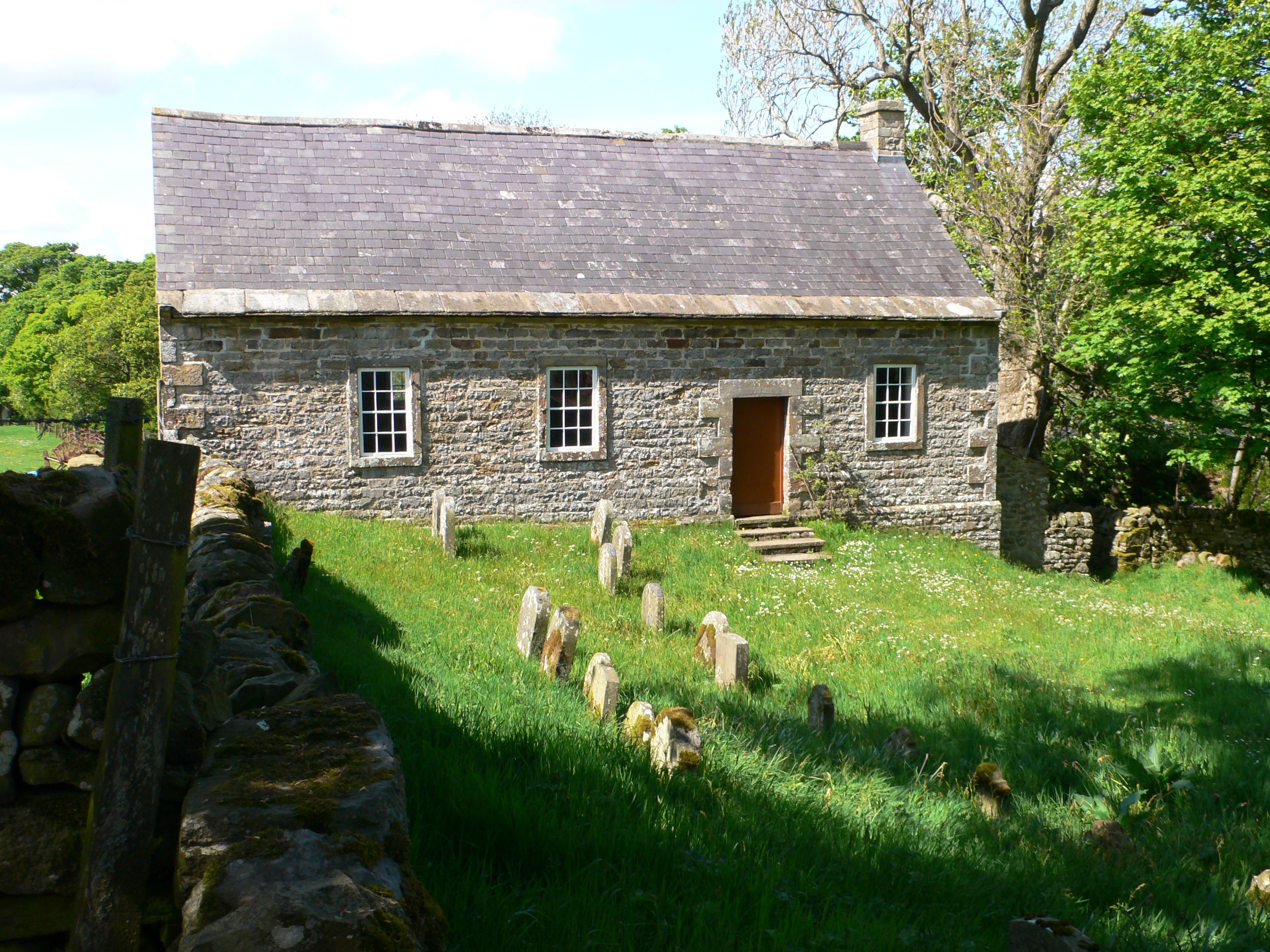
Former Friends Meeting House, Coanwood, Northumberland, England, dating from 1720

Quakers traditionally use numbers for referencing the months and days of the week, something they call the plain calendar. This does not use names of calendar units derived from the names of pagan deities. The week begins with First Day (Sunday) and ends with Seventh Day (Saturday). Months run from First (January) to Twelfth (December). This rests on the terms used in the Bible, e.g. that Jesus Christ's followers went to the tomb early on the First Day. The plain calendar emerged in the 17th century in England in the Puritan movement, but became closely identified with Friends by the end of the 1650s, and was commonly employed into the 20th century. It is less commonly found today. The term "First Day school" is commonly used for what is referred to by other churches as "Sunday school".

From 1155 to 1751, the English calendar (and that of Wales, Ireland and the British colonies overseas) marked March 25 as the first day of the year. For this reason, Quaker records of the 17th and early 18th centuries usually referred to March as First Month and February as Twelfth Month.

Like other Christian denominations derived from 16th-century Puritanism, many Friends eschew religious festivals (e.g. Christmas, Lent, or Easter), and believe that Christ's birth, crucifixion and resurrection, should be marked every day of the year. For example, many Quakers feel that fasting in Lent, but then eating in excess at other times of the year is hypocrisy. Many Quakers, rather than observing Lent, live a simple lifestyle all the year round (see Testimony of simplicity). Such practices are called the testimony against times and seasons.

The Richmond Declaration, affirmed by the Orthodox branch of Quakerism, teaches the importance of the observance of the Lord's Day consistent with First-day Sabbatarian principles, though some Friends are non-Sabbatarians, holding that "every day is the Lord's day", and that what should be done on a First Day should be done every day of the week, although Meeting for Worship is usually held on a First Day, after the advice first issued by the elders of Balby in 1656.

== Worship ==
Most groups of Quakers meet for regular worship. There are two main types of worship worldwide: programmed worship and waiting worship.

=== Programmed worship ===
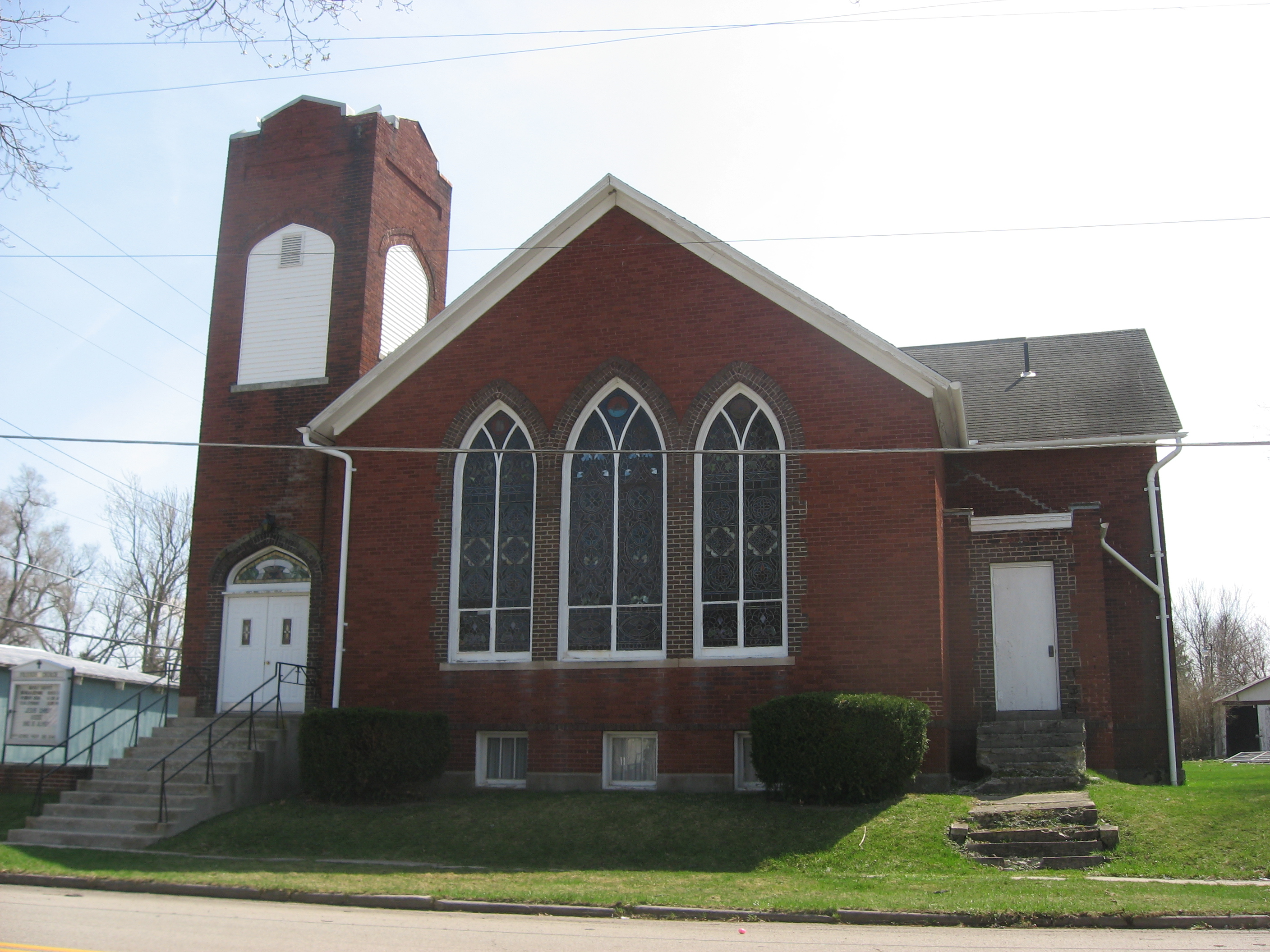
West Mansfield Friends Church, Ohio, affiliated with the Evangelical Friends Church International

In programmed worship there is often a prepared Biblical message, which may be delivered by an individual with theological training from a Bible College. There may be hymns, a sermon, Bible readings, joint prayers and a period of silent worship. The worship resembles the church services of other Protestant denominations, although in most cases does not include the Eucharist. A paid pastor may be responsible for pastoral care. Worship of this kind is celebrated by about 89% of Friends worldwide. It is found in many Yearly Meetings in Africa, Asia and parts of the US (central and southern), and is common in programmed meetings affiliated to Friends United Meeting (who make up around 49% of worldwide membership), and evangelical meetings, including those affiliated to Evangelical Friends International (who make up at least 40% of Friends worldwide). The religious event is sometimes called a Quaker meeting for worship or sometimes a Friends church service. This tradition arose among Friends in the United States in the 19th century, and in response to many converts to Christian Quakerism during the national spiritual revival of the time. Friends meetings in Africa and Latin America were generally started by Orthodox Friends from programmed elements of the Society, so that most African and Latin American Friends worship in a programmed style.

Some Friends hold Semi-Programmed Worship, which brings programmed elements such as hymns and readings into an otherwise unprogrammed service of worship.

=== Unprogrammed worship ===
External videos
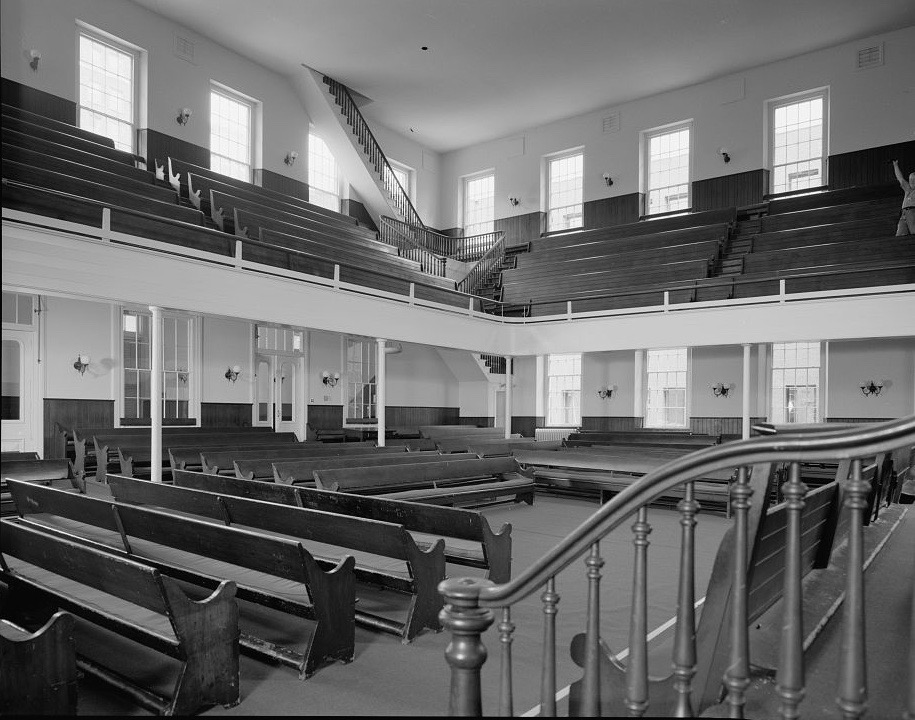
- What to Expect in Quaker Meeting for Worship, QuakerSpeak

Unprogrammed worship (also known as waiting worship, silent worship, or holy communion in the manner of Friends) rests on the practices of George Fox and early Friends, who based their beliefs and practices on their interpretation of how early Christians worshipped God their Heavenly Father. Friends gather together in "expectant waiting upon God" to experience his still small voice leading them from within. There is no plan on how the meeting will proceed, and practice varies widely between Meetings and individual worship services. Friends believe that God plans what will happen, with his spirit leading people to speak. A participant who feels led to speak will stand and share a spoken ministry in front of others. When this happens, Quakers believe that the spirit of God is speaking through the speaker. After someone has spoken, it is customary to allow a few minutes to pass in silence for reflection on what was said, before further vocal ministry is given. Sometimes a meeting is quite silent, sometimes many speak. These meetings lasted for several hours in George Fox's day.

Modern meetings are often limited to an hour, ending when two people (usually the elders) exchange the sign of peace by a handshake. This handshake is often shared by the others. This style of worship is the norm in Britain, Ireland, the continent of Europe, Australia, New Zealand, Southern Africa, Canada, and parts of the United States (particularly yearly meetings associated with Friends General Conference and Beanite Quakerism)—constituting about 11% of Quakers. Those who worship in this way hold each person to be equal before God and capable of knowing the light of God directly. Anyone present may speak if feeling led to do so. Traditionally, Recorded Ministers were recognised for their particular gift in vocal ministry. This practice continues among Conservative Friends and Liberal Friends (e.g. New York Yearly Meeting,), but many meetings where Liberal Friends predominate abolished this practice. London Yearly Meeting of Friends abolished the acknowledging and recording of Recorded Ministers in 1924.

== Governance and organisation ==
=== Organisational government and polity ===
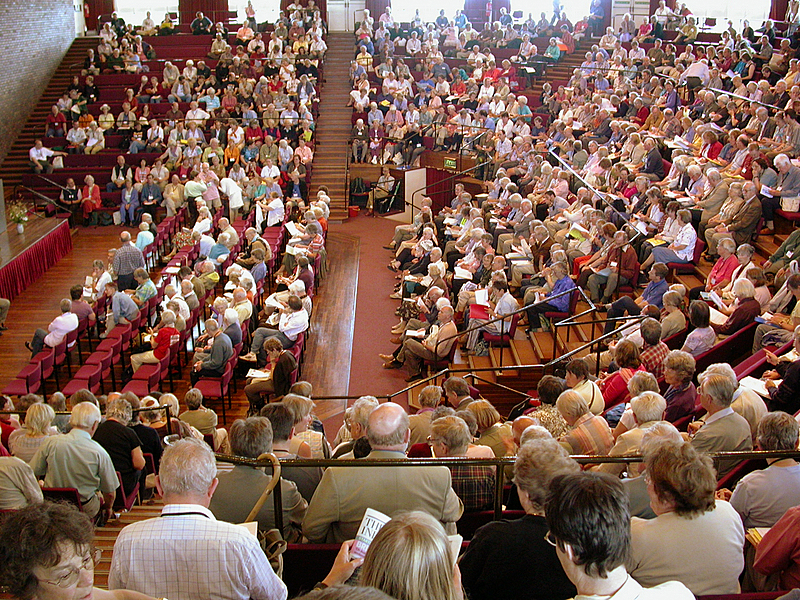
Quaker business meeting in York

Governance and decision-making are conducted at a special meeting for worship – often called a meeting for worship with a concern for business or meeting for worship for church affairs, where all members can attend, as in a Congregational church. Quakers consider this a form of worship, conducted in the manner of meeting for worship. They believe it is a gathering of believers who wait upon the Lord to discover God's will, believing they are not making their own decisions. They seek to understand God's will for the religious community, via the actions of the Holy Spirit within the meeting.

As in a meeting for worship, each member is expected to listen to God, and if led by Him, stand up and contribute. In some business meetings, Friends wait for the clerk to acknowledge them before speaking. Direct replies to someone's contribution are not permitted, with an aim of seeking truth rather than debate. A decision is reached when the meeting as a whole feels that the "way forward" has been discerned (also called "coming to unity"). There is no voting. On some occasions Friends may delay a decision because they feel the meeting is not following God's will. Others (especially non-Friends) may describe this as consensus decision-making; however, Friends in general continue to seek God's will. It is assumed that if everyone is attuned to God's spirit, the way forward becomes clear.

=== International organisation ===
Friends World Committee for Consultation (FWCC) is the international Quaker organisation that loosely unifies the different religious traditions of Quakers; FWCC brings together the largest variety of Friends in the world. Friends World Committee for Consultation is divided into four sections to represent different regions of the world: Africa, Asia West Pacific, Europe and Middle East, and the Americas.

Various organisations associated with Friends include a United States' lobbying organisation based in Washington, D.C. called the Friends Committee on National Legislation (FCNL); service organizations such as the American Friends Service Committee (AFSC), the Quaker United Nations Offices, Quaker Peace and Social Witness, Friends Committee on Scouting, the Quaker Peace Centre in Cape Town, South Africa, and the Alternatives to Violence Project.

=== Yearly meetings ===
Quakers today are organised into independent and regional, national bodies called Yearly Meetings, which have often split from one another over doctrinal differences. Several of such unite Quakers who share similar religious beliefs – for example Evangelical Friends Church International unites evangelical Christian Friends; Friends United Meeting unites Friends into "fellowships where Jesus Christ is known, loved and obeyed as Teacher and Lord;" and Friends General Conference links Quakers with non-creed, liberal religious beliefs. Many Quaker Yearly Meetings also belong to the Friends World Committee for Consultation, an international fellowship of Yearly Meetings from different Quaker traditions.

=== Membership ===
A Friend is a member of a Yearly Meeting, usually beginning with membership in a local monthly meeting. Means of acquiring membership vary. For example, in most Kenyan yearly meetings, attenders who wish to become members must take part in some two years' adult education, memorising key Bible passages, and learning about the history of orthodox Christianity and of Christian Quakerism. Within the Britain Yearly Meeting, membership is acquired through a process of peer review, where a potential member is visited by several members, who report to the other members before a decision is reached.

Within some Friends Churches in the Evangelical Friends Church – in particular in Rwanda, Burundi, and parts of the United States – an adult believer's baptism by immersion in water is optional. Within Liberal Friends, Conservative Friends, and Pastoral Friends Churches, Friends do not practise water baptism, Christening, or other initiation ceremonies to admit a new member or a newborn baby. Children are often welcomed into the meeting at their first attendance. Formerly, children born to Quaker parents automatically became members (sometimes called birthright membership), but this no longer applies in many areas. Some parents apply for membership on behalf of their children, while others allow children to decide whether to be a member when they are ready and older in age. Some meetings adopt a policy that children, some time after becoming young adults, must apply independently for membership.

== Worship for specific tasks ==
=== Memorial services ===
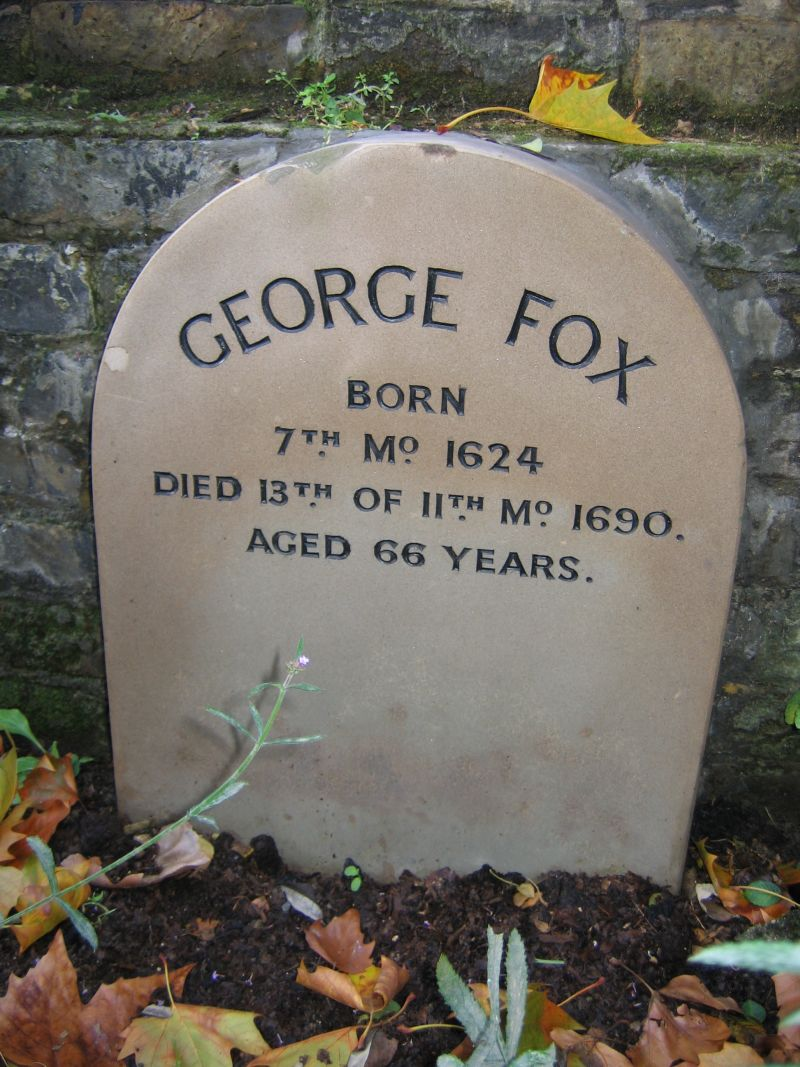
The Quaker testimony of simplicity extends to memorialisation. Founder George Fox is remembered with a simple grave marker at Quaker Gardens, Islington, London.

Traditional Quaker memorial services are held as a form of worship and known as memorial meetings. Friends gather for worship and offer remembrances of the deceased. In some Quaker traditions, the coffin or ashes are not present. Memorial meetings may be held many weeks after the death, which can enable wider attendance, replacement of grief with spiritual reflection, and celebration of life to dominate. Memorial meetings can last over an hour, particularly if many people attend. Memorial services give all a chance to remember the lost individual in their own way, comforting those present and re-affirming the love of the people in the wider community.

=== Marriage ===
A meeting for worship for the solemnisation of marriage in an unprogrammed Friends meeting is similar to any other unprogrammed meeting for worship. The pair exchange declarations before God and gathered witnesses, and the meeting returns to open worship. (Declarations are used as typically Friends do not swear oaths or make vows). At the rise of meeting, the witnesses, including the youngest children, are asked to sign the wedding certificate as a record. In Britain, Quakers keep a separate record of the union and notify the General Register Office.

In the early days of the United States, there was doubt whether a marriage solemnised in that way was entitled to legal recognition. Over the years, each state has set rules for the procedure. Most states expect the marriage document to be signed by a single officiant (a priest, rabbi, minister, Justice of the Peace, etc.) Quakers routinely modify the document to allow three or four Friends to sign as officiant. Often these are the members of a committee of ministry and oversight, who have helped the couple to plan their marriage. Usually, a separate document containing the vows and signatures of all present is kept by the couple and often displayed prominently in their home.

In many Friends meetings, the couple meet with a clearness committee before the wedding. Its purpose is to discuss with the couple the many aspects of marriage and life as a couple. If the couple seem ready, the marriage is recommended to the meeting.

As in wider society, there is a diversity of views among Friends on the issue of same-sex marriage. Various Friends meetings around the world have voiced support for and recognised same-sex marriages. In 1986, Hartford Friends Meeting in Connecticut reached a decision that "the Meeting recognised a committed union in a celebration of marriage, under the care of the Meeting. The same loving care and consideration should be given to both homosexual and heterosexual applicants as outlined in Faith and Practice." Since then, other meetings of liberal and progressive Friends from Australia, Britain, New Zealand, parts of North America, and other countries have recognised marriage between partners of the same sex. In jurisdictions where same-sex marriage is not recognised by civil authorities, some meetings follow the practice of early Quakers in overseeing the union without reference to the state. There are also Friends who do not support same-sex marriage. Some Evangelical and Pastoral yearly meetings in the United States have issued public statements stating that homosexuality is a sin.

== National and international divisions and organisation ==
=== By country ===
Worldwide distribution of Quakers by country in 2017 according to the Friends World Committee for Consultation: No data 1–99 100–999 1,000–3,999 4,000–9,999 10,000–119,285

Like many religious movements, the Religious Society of Friends has evolved, changed, and split into sub-groups.

Quakerism started in England and Wales, and quickly spread to Ireland, the Netherlands, Barbados and North America. In 2017, there were 119,200 Quakers in Kenya, 80,000 in the United States, 47,600 in Burundi and 28,500 in Bolivia. Other countries with over 5,000 Quakers were Guatemala, the United Kingdom, Nepal, Taiwan and Uganda.

Although the total number of Quakers is around 377,500 worldwide, Quaker influence is concentrated in Philadelphia, Pennsylvania; Kaimosi, Kenya; Newberg, Oregon; Greenleaf, Idaho; Whittier, California; Richmond, Indiana; Friendswood, Texas; Birmingham, England; Ramallah, Palestine, and Greensboro, North Carolina.

=== Africa ===
The highest concentration of Quakers is in Africa. The Friends of East Africa were at one time part of a single East Africa Yearly Meeting, then the world's largest. Today, the region is served by several distinct yearly meetings. Most are affiliated with the Friends United Meeting, practice programmed worship and employ pastors. Friends meet in Rwanda and Burundi; new work is beginning in North Africa. Small unprogrammed meetings exist also in Botswana, Ghana, Lesotho, Namibia, Nigeria, South Africa and Zimbabwe.

In 2017, there were around 181,000 adult Quakers in Africa.

=== Australia and New Zealand ===
Friends in Australia and New Zealand follow the unprogrammed tradition, similar to that of the Britain Yearly Meeting. Considerable distances between the colonies and small numbers of Quakers meant that Australia Friends were dependent on London until the 20th century. The Society remained unprogrammed and is named Australia Yearly Meeting, with local organizations around seven Regional Meetings: Canberra (which extends into southern New South Wales), New South Wales, Queensland, South Australia (which extends into Northern Territory), Tasmania, Victoria, and Western Australia. The Friends' School is found in Hobart. An annual meeting each January, is hosted by a different Regional Meeting over a seven-year cycle, with a Standing Committee each July or August. The Australia Yearly Meeting published This We Can Say: Australian Quaker Life, Faith and Thought in 2003.

Meetings for worship in New Zealand started in Nelson in 1842 and in Auckland in 1885. In 1889 it was estimated that there were about 30 Quakers in Auckland. The New Zealand Yearly Meeting, today consists of nine monthly meetings. The Yearly Meeting published On These Islands I runga i ngā motu nei Quaker Faith and Practice in Aotearoa New Zealand, in 2003, and a revised edition in 2024.

=== Asia ===
Quaker meetings occur in India, Cambodia, Indonesia, Hong Kong, South Korea, Philippines, Japan, Bhutan and Nepal. There are also Quaker worship houses in other Asian nations such as Myanmar and Singapore as of 2017.

India has four yearly meetings: the unprogrammed Mid-India Yearly Meeting, programmed Bhopal Yearly Meeting, and the Mahoba Yearly Meeting. Bundelkhand Yearly Meeting is an evangelical Friends Church affiliated to Evangelical Friends International. Other programmed and unprogrammed worship groups are not affiliated to any yearly meeting.

Evangelical Friends Churches exist in the Philippines and Nepal and are affiliated to Evangelical Friends Church International.

=== Europe ===
In the United Kingdom, the predominantly liberal and unprogrammed Yearly Meeting of the Religious Society of Friends (Quakers) in Britain, has 478 local meetings, and 14,260 adult members, with an additional 8,560 non-member adults who attend worship and 2,251 children. The number has declined steadily since the mid-20th century. Programmed meetings occur, including in Wem and London. Small groups of Conservative Friends meet in Ripley and Greenwich in England, and Arbroath in Scotland, who follow the Ohio Yearly Meeting's Book of Discipline.

Evangelical Friends Central Europe Yearly Meeting has 4,306 members across six nations, including Albania, Hungary and Romania.

Ireland Yearly Meeting is unprogrammed and more conservative than Britain Yearly Meeting. It has 1,591 members in 28 meetings across the Republic of Ireland, and in Northern Ireland.

German Yearly Meeting is unprogrammed and liberal and has 453 members, worshipping in 31 meetings in Germany and Austria.

Small groups of Friends in Czech Republic, Estonia, Greece, Latvia, Lithuania, Malta, Poland, Portugal, and Ukraine attend meetings for worship there.

=== Middle East ===
Middle East Yearly Meeting has meetings in Lebanon (Brummana Monthly Meeting) and Palestine (Ramallah Monthly Meeting).

The Ramallah Friends Meeting is in association with the Friends World Committee for Consultation and is affiliated with the Friends United Meeting.

There has been an active and vibrant Palestinian Quaker community in Ramallah since the late 1800s. In 1910 this community built the Ramallah Friends Meetinghouse and later added another building that was used for community outreach. The Ramallah Friends Meeting has always played a vital role in the community. In 1948 the buildings and grounds became home to many Palestinian refugees. Throughout the years, the members of the Ramallah Friends Meeting organised numerous community programs such as the Children's Play Centre, the First Day School, and women's activities.

By the early 1990s the Meetinghouse and Annex, which housed meeting rooms and bathroom facilities, fell into disrepair as a result of damage inflicted by time and the impact of conflict. So serious was the deterioration of the meetinghouse that by the middle 1990s it was impossible to use the building at all. A further blow to the Friends and the wider Palestinian community was the high level of emigration brought on by the economic situation and the hardships arising from continuing Israeli military occupation. The Meetinghouse, which had served as a place of worship for the Friends in Ramallah could no longer be used as such and the Annex could no longer be used for community outreach.

In 2002 a committee consisting of members of the Religious Society of Friends in the US and the Clerk of the Ramallah Meeting began to raise funds for the renovations of the buildings and grounds of the Meetinghouse. By November 2004 the renovations were complete, and on 6 March 2005, exactly 95 years to the day after the dedication, the Meetinghouse and Annex were rededicated as a Quaker and community resource. Friends meet every Sunday for unprogrammed Meeting for Worship. The meeting is open to Quakers and non-Quakers, including Muslims.

The Brummana Monthly meeting in Lebanon was founded in 1868. It is closely associated with the Brummana High School, which was founded by Quakers in 1873. Conflict and economic conditions have caused the meeting to drop in membership. There are presently around 35 attendees which meet every Sunday.

=== North and South America ===
Quakers can be found throughout the Americas. Friends in the United States in particular have diverse worship styles and differences of theology, vocabulary, and practice.

A local congregation in the unprogrammed tradition is called a meeting, or a monthly meeting (e.g., Smalltown Meeting or Smalltown Monthly Meeting). The reference to "monthly" is because the meeting meets monthly to conduct the group's business. Most "monthly meetings" meet for worship at least once a week; some meetings have several worship meetings during the week. In programmed traditions, local congregations are often referred to as "Friends Churches" or "Meetings".

Monthly meetings are often part of a regional group called a quarterly meeting, which is usually part of an even larger group called a yearly meeting; with the adjectives "quarterly" and "yearly" referring specifically to the frequency of meetings for worship with a concern for business.

Some yearly meetings, like Philadelphia Yearly Meeting, belong to larger organisations to help maintain order and communication within the Society. The three chief ones are Friends General Conference (FGC), Friends United Meeting (FUM), and Evangelical Friends Church International (EFCI). In all three groups, most member organisations, though not necessarily members, are from the United States. FGC is theologically the most liberal of the three groups, while EFCI is the most evangelical. FUM is the largest; it was originally known as "Five Years Meeting". Some monthly meetings belong to more than one larger organisation, while others are fully independent.

=== Service organisations ===
Star symbol used by many service organisations of the Religious Society of Friends

There are many Quaker service organizations dedicated to peace and humanitarian activities overseas. The first, the British Friends Service Council (FSC), was founded in Great Britain in 1927 and shared the 1947 Nobel Prize for Peace with the American Friends Service Committee (AFSC).

The Quaker star is used by many Quaker service organizations, such as The American Friends Service Committee, Canadian Friends Service Committee and Quaker Peace and Social Witness (previously Friends Service Council). It was originally used by British Quakers performing war relief efforts during the Franco-Prussian War to distinguish themselves from the Red Cross. Today the star is used by multiple Quaker organizations as their symbol to represent "a common commitment to service and the spirit in which it is provided."

== Relations with other churches and faiths ==
=== Ecumenical relations ===
Prior to the 20th century Quakers considered the Religious Society of Friends to be a Christian movement, but many did not feel that their religious faith fit within the categories of Catholic, Orthodox, or Protestant. Many Conservative Friends, while fully seeing themselves as orthodox Christians, choose to remain separate from other Christian groups.

Many Friends in Liberal Friends' meetings are actively involved in the ecumenical movement, often working closely with other Mainline Protestant and liberal Christian churches, with whom they share common religious ground. A concern for peace and social justice often brings Friends together with other Christian churches and other Christian groups. Some Liberal Quaker yearly meetings are members of ecumenical pan-Christian organisations, which include Protestant and Orthodox churches—for example Philadelphia Yearly Meeting is a member of the National Council of Churches. The Britain Yearly Meeting is a member of Churches Together in Britain and Ireland, and Friends General Conference is a member of the World Council of Churches.

Gurneyite Friends would typically see themselves as part of an orthodox Christian movement and work closely with other Christian denominations. Friends United Meeting (the international organisation of Gurneyite yearly meetings) is a member of the National Council of Churches and the World Council of Churches, which are pan-Christian organisations that include Lutheran, Orthodox, Reformed, Anglican and Baptist Churches, among others.

Evangelical Friends work closely with other evangelical churches from other Christian traditions. The North American branch of Evangelical Friends Church International is a member church of the National Association of Evangelicals. Evangelical Friends tend to be less involved with non-evangelical churches and are not members of the World Council of Churches or National Council of Churches.

The majority of other Christian groups recognise Friends among their fellow-Christians. Some people who attend Quaker Meetings assume that Quakers are not Christians, when they do not hear overtly Christian language during the meeting for worship.

=== Relations with other faiths ===
Relationships between Quakers and non-Christians vary considerably, according to sect, geography, and history.

Early Quakers distanced themselves from practices that they saw as pagan. For instance, they refused to use the usual names of the days of the week, since they were derived from the names of pagan deities. They refused to celebrate Christmas because they believed it was based on pagan festivities.

Early Friends called on adherents of other world religions to turn to the 'Light of Christ within' that they believed was present in all people born into the world. For example, George Fox wrote a number of open letters to Jews and Muslims, in which he encouraged them to turn to Jesus Christ as the only path to salvation (e.g., A Visitation to the Jews, To the Great Turk and King of Algiers in Algeria, and all that are under his authority, to read this over, which concerns their salvation and To the Great Turk and King of Algiers in Algeria). In the letters to Muslim readers, Fox is exceptional for his time in his sympathetic and wide-ranging use of the Qur'an, and his belief that its contents were consistent with Christian scripture.

Mary Fisher probably preached the same message when she appeared before the Muslim Mehmed IV (the Sultan of the Ottoman Empire) in 1658.

In 1870, Richard Price Hallowell argued that the logical extension of Christian Quakerism is a universal Church, which "demands a religion which embraces Jew, Pagan and Christian, and which cannot be limited by the dogmas of one or the other".

Since the late 20th century, in part due to the allowance of Religious pluralism & Universalism, some attenders at Liberal Quaker Meetings have actively identified with world faiths other than Christianity, such as Judaism and Islam.

== See also ==
- The Light upon the Candlestick – a 17th-century tract which was popular among English Quakers
- List of Christian denominations
- Peace Testimony
- Shakers
- Testimony of equality
- Testimony of integrity – Behavioural code of Quakers
- Testimony of simplicity – Behavioural practice of Quakers
