= Testimony of simplicity =

Behavioural practice of Quakers

The testimony of simplicity is a shorthand description of the actions generally taken by members of the Religious Society of Friends (Friends or Quakers) to testify or bear witness to their beliefs that a person ought to live a simple life in order to focus on what is most important, and ignore (or minimize) what is least important. The testimony of simplicity reflects the Quaker belief that life should be organized in a way that frees individuals from unnecessary material or emotional burdens, enabling clearer attention to spiritual values and God’s guidance.

The Religious Society of Friends believes that a person's spiritual life and character are more important than the quantity of goods he possesses or his monetary worth. They also believe that one should use one's resources, including money and time, deliberately in ways that are most likely to make life truly better for oneself and others. The word testimony describes the way that they testify or bear witness to their beliefs in their everyday life. A testimony is therefore not a belief, but is committed action arising out of their religious experience. Testimony to simplicity includes the practice among Quakers (members of the Religious Society of Friends) of being more concerned with one's inner condition than one's outward appearance and with other people more than oneself.

== General explanation ==
Early Friends believed that it was important to avoid fanciness in dress, speech, and material possessions, because those things tend to distract one from waiting on God's personal guidance. They also tend to cause a person to focus on himself more than on his fellow human beings, in violation of Jesus' teaching to "love thy neighbor as thyself". This emphasis on plainness, as it was called, made the Friends in certain times and places easily recognizable to the society around them, particularly by their plain dress in the 18th and 19th centuries.

Simplicity to Friends has generally been a reference to material possessions. Friends have often limited their possessions to what they need to live their lives, rather than accumulating luxuries. The testimony is not just about the nature of one's material possessions, but rather also about one's attitude towards these material goods. Many Friends who have been considered exemplary have also been wealthy; their commitment to the testimony, however, led them to use their wealth for spiritual purposes, including aid to the poor and oppressed. On the other hand, some Friends, such as John Woolman, gave up much of their wealth and economic position when they felt it to be a spiritual burden. In recent decades Friends have given the testimony an ecological dimension: that Friends should not use more than their fair share of the Earth's limited resources.

Plainness is an extension of the testimony of simplicity that continues to be practiced by modern Friends who do not follow fashion trends or purchase extravagant clothing.

This testimony also finds expression in the tradition of plain walls and functional furniture in Quaker meeting houses.

== Simplicity in dress ==
Traditionally, wearing plain dress was an answer to a number of Friends' concerns. Expensive styles were used to show social inequality and make statements about wealth. Only a select few could afford expensive adornments, which could then be used to exacerbate differences between people based on class, where people in fancy clothing would not want to be seen socializing with others dressed tattily. This was part of the inspiration for the Quaker testimony to equality. In addition, the frequent buying of expensive new styles and discarding what had recently been bought, was considered wasteful and self-seeking, where Friends instead aimed to focus on simplicity, and the important things in life. Notably, Friends did not consider it right to judge people on their material possessions, but this could not be achieved in a society which placed an emphasis on keeping up to date with inconsequential but expensive new trends. At the time, this practice of plainness meant Friends were obviously identifiable.

As fashions changed over time, the Quaker ideal of plain dress stood out against contemporary clothing. As a result, the traditional forms of this practice were dropped by most Friends. Today, it is more likely that Friends will try to put their faith into action by dressing in a plain version of current fashions—such as avoiding clothing displaying designer labels. They may also try to buy only the clothing they need, and pay more for fairly traded clothing that has been made ethically.

Friends used to have a strong tradition of simplicity in dress, more properly called "plain dress". Plain dress generally meant wearing clothes that were very similar to Amish or conservative Mennonite dress: often in dark colors and lacking adornments such as fancy (or any) pockets, buttons, buckles, lace, or embroidery. This was widely practiced until the late 19th and early 20th century, when most Friends began dressing more like the rest of society. As the Quaker Oats brand shares the Quaker name, despite having no links with the Society of Friends, there is now a somewhat popular misconception that Friends today still wear the traditional clothing. A small minority of contemporary Friends continue to dress plainly.

Traditional plain dress has survived among the Conservative Friends and Holiness Friends branches of Quakerism, which is today represented by meetings such as the Ohio Yearly Meeting and the Central Yearly Meeting respectively, where there exist Friends who have kept plain dress alive up to the present day. For Conservative Friends, plain dress for men usually includes "a broad-brimmed felt or straw hat, trousers with suspenders instead of a belt, and muted colors in the fabrics: blacks, whites, greys, browns", sometimes with "broad-fall trouser cuts". Quaker men traditionally are clean-shaven. Conservative Quaker women practice Christian headcovering by wearing a "scarf, bonnet, or cap" and "wear long-sleeved, long dresses". The number of contemporary Friends voluntarily wearing traditional plain dress is growing and has been called by some Quakers "The New Plain".

Some Conservative Friends do not self-describe this witness as being part of their simplicity testimony, but rather their integrity testimony, viewing it as an obedience to God's will rather than a witness to a human-generated ideal. Thomas Hamm, in his book Quakers in America, describes a transition among most Friends from plainness to simplicity.

However, the vast majority of Quakers today (apart from Conservative Friends and Holiness Friends) are all but indistinguishable from non-Quakers as far as style of clothing is concerned.

== Simplicity in speech ==
Plainness in speech addressed other concerns than materialism: honesty, avoiding class distinction and vestiges of paganism, and the speaking of truth. These principles were put into practice by affirming rather than making an oath or shaking hands to agree upon a deal, setting fixed prices for goods, avoiding the use of honorific titles and using familiar forms for the second person pronoun. Early Friends also objected to the names of the days and months in the English language, because many of them referred to Roman or Norse gods, such as Mars (March) and Thor (Thursday), and Roman emperors, such as Julius (July). As a result, the days of the week were known as "First Day" for Sunday, "Second Day" for Monday, and so forth. Similarly, the months of the year were "First Month" for January, "Second Month" for February, and so forth. For many Friends today, this is no longer a priority, though the tradition is still kept up by some—especially in the term "First-Day school" for Sunday schools organized by Friends. Many Friends organizations continue to use the "simple calendar" for official records.

Early Friends practiced plainness in speech by not referring to people in the "fancy" ways that were customary. Often Friends would address everyone, including high-ranking persons, using the familiar forms of "thee" and "thou", instead of the respectful "you". Later, as "thee" and "thou" disappeared from everyday English usage, many Quakers continued to use these words as a form of "plain speech", though the original reason for this usage disappeared, along with "hast" and "hath". In the eighteenth century, "thou hast" disappeared, along with the associated second-person verb forms, and the otherwise strange "thee is" became normal "plain speech". Today there are still Friends that will use "thee" with other Quakers. (Note: in 17th century English the forms above would have been "thou hast" and "thou art".) Interestingly, some Friends now use the word "thou"—but sometimes as a plural form.

In languages that today maintain the T–V distinction, usage varies. Following the British usage, early francophone Quakers preferred the use of the more informal tu to address even those who would by convention be addressed with the more formal vous. In more contemporary times, however, usage has swung the other way, and French-speaking Quakers today are more likely than others to use the formal vous. In part, this is a recognition of the complexity of the notion of simplicity in speech, whose intent might be understood to be not a requirement of informality, but a desire to address everyone "simply", i.e., uniformly. The rejection of the past use of tu by white French missionaries to address Africans may be a factor in the contemporary francophone usage.

Titles, such as Mr., Mrs., Miss, Dr., Rev., etc., are often avoided by many Friends. Instead Friends tend to address each other by first and last name with no title. In many Quaker communities children address adults by either their first names, or first and last names but with no title, and in many Quaker schools teachers are called by their first names as well. It is conventional for Friends who do not know each other well, who in non-Quaker circles would address each other with a title, to use first name and last name together, rather than to adopt the more familiar first name only. Friends also tend not to use the appellation sir or madam to refer to someone of whom they do not know the name, instead using the term Friend. In letter-writing, where others might use the phrase Dear Sir or Madam, many Quakers would instead write Dear Friend, and in such letters, rather than finishing yours faithfully would finish either yours in truth or yours in friendship. This practice is now considered more a part of the Testimony of Equality than a part of the Testimony of Simplicity.

Additionally early Friends and modern Friends do not swear oaths, even in courtrooms (a choice that has been allowed in Britain since 1695, and is protected in the United States by the Constitution, and one that can be problematic elsewhere). When required, Quakers may instead "affirm" that they are going to tell the truth. This was considered an aspect of simplicity because it was simply telling the truth rather than embellishing it with an oath, which is not necessary if one is supposed to always tell the truth. It is also an aspect of the Testimony of Integrity. It comes in part from Christ's teaching in the Sermon on the Mount:

Again, you have heard that our forefathers were told, "Do not break your oath," and "Oaths sworn to the Lord must be kept." But what I tell you is this: You are not to swear at all - not by heaven, for it is God's throne, nor by the earth, for it is his footstool, nor by Jerusalem, for it is the city of the great King, nor by your own head, because you cannot turn one hair of it white or black. Plain "Yes" or "No" is all you need to say; anything beyond that comes from the evil one

— Revised English Bible. Matthew Ch 5: vv 33-37

Above all things, my friends, do not use oaths, whether "by heaven" or "by earth" or by anything else. When you say "Yes" or "No", let it be plain Yes or No, for fear you draw down judgement on yourselves

— Revised English Bible. James Ch 5: v 12

In a similar manner Friends avoid haggling over prices. They simply set a fixed price that they considered fair, which went against the custom of earlier times, but was felt by them to be simpler and more honest (this practice is generally considered more a part of the Testimony of Integrity than a part of the Testimony of Simplicity).

== Simplicity in general life ==
The Testimony of Simplicity is an important part of Quaker life, and many examples of its influence can be seen in both day-to-day and ceremonious practices. In keeping with the testimony, for example, many meetings that have care of a graveyard ask that those erecting monuments to deceased Friends keep the testimony in mind and erect only a simple, low-lying stone. Quaker practice documents emphasize that simplicity does not require living in poverty or rejecting beauty, but involves thoughtful priorities that strengthen one’s spiritual life and relationships. Within Quaker testimonies, simplicity functions alongside peace, integrity, and equality as an expression of lived faith rather than rigid doctrine.

== See also ==
- Testimony of equality
- Testimony of integrity
- Testimony of peace

== General and cited sources ==
- Hamm, Thomas D., Quakers in America, (Contemporary American Religion series), Columbia University Press, 2003. ISBN 0-231-12362-0. NOTE: The section on "Simplicity" is at pp. 101–108. Some pages from this section are available on Google Books.
- Fager, Charles E., "The Quaker Testimony of Simplicity" in Quaker Religious Thought, Vol. 14, #1. Summer, 1972.
- Foster, Richard J., Freedom of Simplicity, Harper & Row, 1981. ISBN 0-06-104385-0
- Pym, Jim, Listening To The Light: How To Bring Quaker Simplicity And Integrity Into Our Lives, Rider Books, 1999.
- Whitmire, Catherine, Plain Living: A Quaker Path to Simplicity, Sorin Books, 2001. ISBN 1-893732-28-2
