= Testimony of integrity =

Behavioural code of Quakers

Testimony to integrity and truth refers to the way many members of the Religious Society of Friends (Quakers) testify or bear witness to their belief that one should live a life that is true to God, true to oneself, and true to others. To Friends, the concept of integrity includes personal wholeness and consistency as well as honesty and fair dealings. From personal and inward integrity flow the outward signs of integrity, which include honesty and fairness. It is not only about telling the truth but also about applying ultimate truth to each situation. For example, Friends (Quakers) believe that integrity requires avoiding statements that are technically true, but misleading.

The word testimony is used to refer to the ways in which Friends testify or bear witness to their faith in their everyday lives. In this context, the word testimony refers not to Friends' underlying beliefs about truth and integrity but their committed action to promote and act in truthful and integral ways, which arises out of their beliefs.

Also known as the Testimony of Truth, or Truth Testimony, the essence of the Testimony of Integrity is placing God at the center of one's life. To Friends, integrity is in choosing to follow the leading of the Spirit despite the challenges and urges to do otherwise.

That testimony has led to the Friends having a reputation for being honest and fair in their dealings with others. It has led them to give proper credit to others for their contributions and to accept responsibility for their own actions. In those legal systems, if it is allowed, rather than swearing oaths in a court of law, Friends prefer to affirm. In England, that has been the case since 1695.

Among some early Friends, the testimony led them to refuse to participate in drama, and they stated that to pretend they were someone else was to deny their integrity.

== Oaths and fair-dealing ==
Early Friends believed that an important part of Jesus's message was how we treat our fellow human beings. They felt that honest dealing with others meant more than avoiding direct lies. Friends continue to believe that it is important not to mislead others, even if the words used are all technically truthful. Early Friends refused to swear oaths, even in courtrooms, believing that one must speak truth at all times, and the act of swearing to it implied different standards of truth with and without oaths. That doctrine is attributed to Jesus in the Sermon on the Mount (specifically Matthew 5:34-37).

Some Friends have accepted the use of "affirmations" rather than oaths, believing that "taking oaths implies a double standard of truth".

== Spiritual aspect of truth and integrity ==
The essence of testimony to integrity is placing God at the center of one's life. Quakers believe that the Spirit is in everyone. Integrity means focusing and spending time listening to the small voice of the Spirit and being open to being led by it, whether the Spirit is speaking within oneself or through another.

Giving testimony to truth and integrity also means refusing to place things other than God at the center of one's life, whether one's own self, possessions, the regard of others, belief in principles (such as rationality, progress, or justice) or something else. It is the understanding that even good things are no longer good when they supplant God as one's center.

Some Quakers believe that to put integrity and efforts to build it at the center of one's life is to put God at the center of one's life.

== Examples of testimony to truth and integrity ==
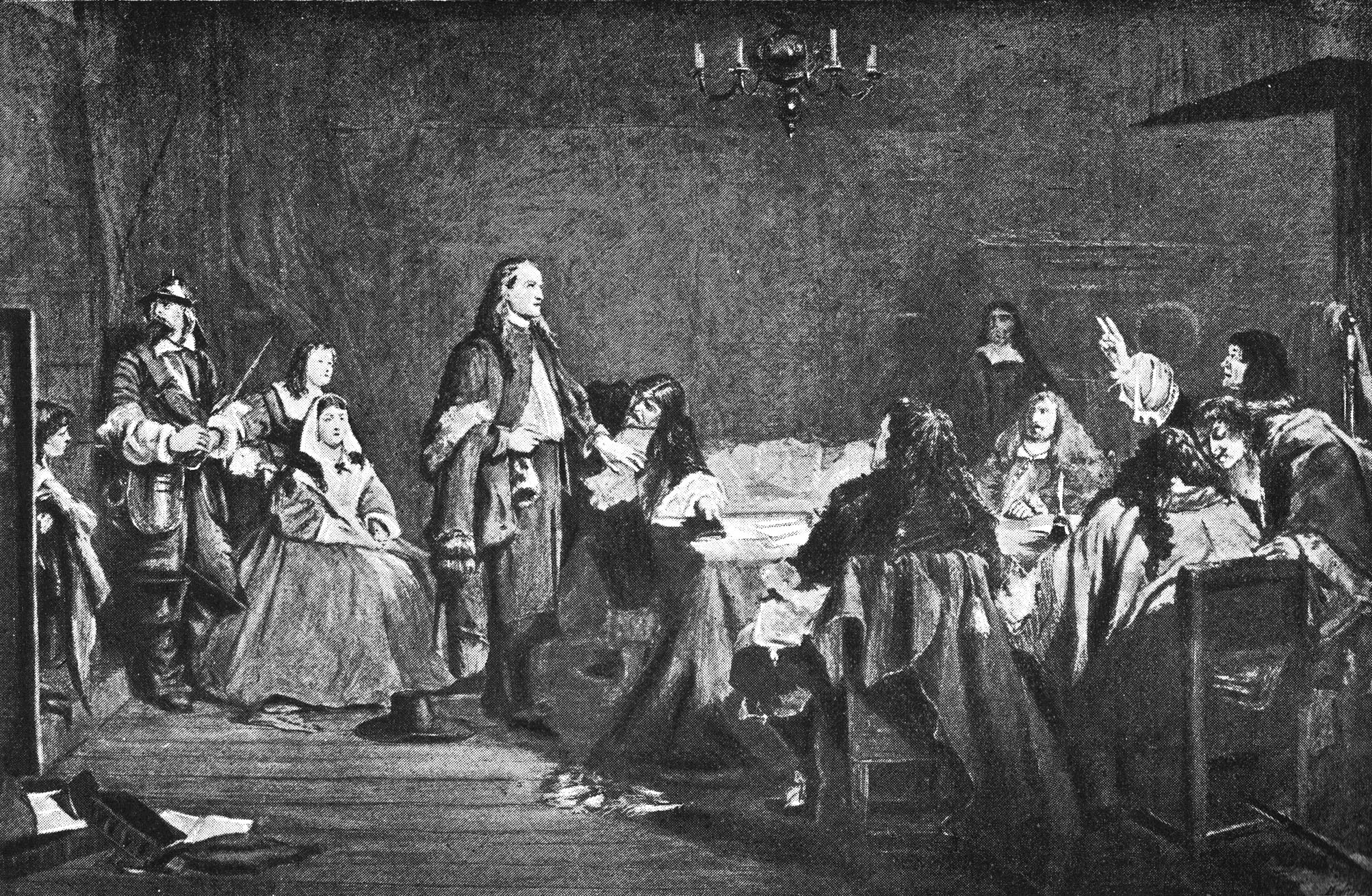
George Fox refusing to take oath, 1663

Since early in the foundation of the Religious Society of Friends, Quakers have refused to take oaths, following Jesus' teaching of Matthew 5:34–37. Rather than swearing or taking an oath, Quakers instead answered "yea" or "nay" to questions, believing that swearing oaths was often a way to avoid telling the truth while appearing to do so, and that a person's word should be accepted as truth based on their reputation for telling the truth, rather than any oath sworn or taken. This was embodied in their quote "let your yea be yea and your nay be nay", from James 5:12.

Later, when many Quakers became successful in business (such as Cadbury, Rowntree, Fry, etc.), they set a fixed price for goods on sale rather than setting a high price and haggling over it with the buyer, believing it to be dishonest to set an unfair price to begin with. By having fixed and reasonable prices, Quakers soon developed a reputation as honest businessmen, and many people came to trust them in trading and in banking. Thus, the Quaker name or image was adopted by business ventures of non-Quakers, such as oats and oil companies, to imply their fair dealing in price and quality.

Other examples of ways in which Friends 'testify' or 'bear witness' to truth and integrity include such practices as:

- making sure that one's words and actions flow from one's beliefs
- speaking the truth, even when it is difficult
- paying people fair wages for their work
- giving one's employer the right amount of labor for one's pay
- saying difficult things with grace and tact
- receiving difficult sayings gracefully
- guarding one's reputation for honesty, fairness, and fidelity
- taking responsibility for one's actions and their results
- fulfilling one's commitments
- taking care of items entrusted to one
- being open to the ideas of others but not being too easily swayed by them
- confronting lapses in integrity in oneself and in others
- giving credit to others for their contributions
- assessing people and situations fairly and accurately
- avoiding spending beyond one's means through the use of credit

== See also ==
- Affirmation in law – Solemn declaration and oath alternative
- Testimony of equality
- Testimony of peace
- Testimony of simplicity

== Sources ==
- Cooper, Wilmer. The Testimony of Integrity. Pendle Hill, 1991.
- Pym, Jim. Listening To The Light: How To Bring Quaker Simplicity And Integrity Into Our Lives. Rider Books, 1999.
