= Benenson =

The surname Benenson may refer to:

- Abram Salmon Benenson (1914–2003), American public health physician
- Charles Benenson (1913–2004), American real estate broker
- Emily Benenson (born 1957), American figure skater
- Fira Benenson (1898–1977), Russian-born American fashion designer
- Flora Solomon (née Benenson), (1895–1984) Russian-born British social activist
- Grigori Benenson (1860–1939), Jewish Russian financier
- Joel Benenson (born 1952), American pollster and consultant
- Manya Harari (née Benenson), (1905–1969) Russian-born British translator of Doctor Zhivago
- Peter Benenson (1921–2005), English lawyer and founder of Amnesty International
