= 2014 Texas gubernatorial election =

- November 4, 2014
- Turnout: 33.7% (of registered voters) ▼4.3pp 25.0% (of voting age population)
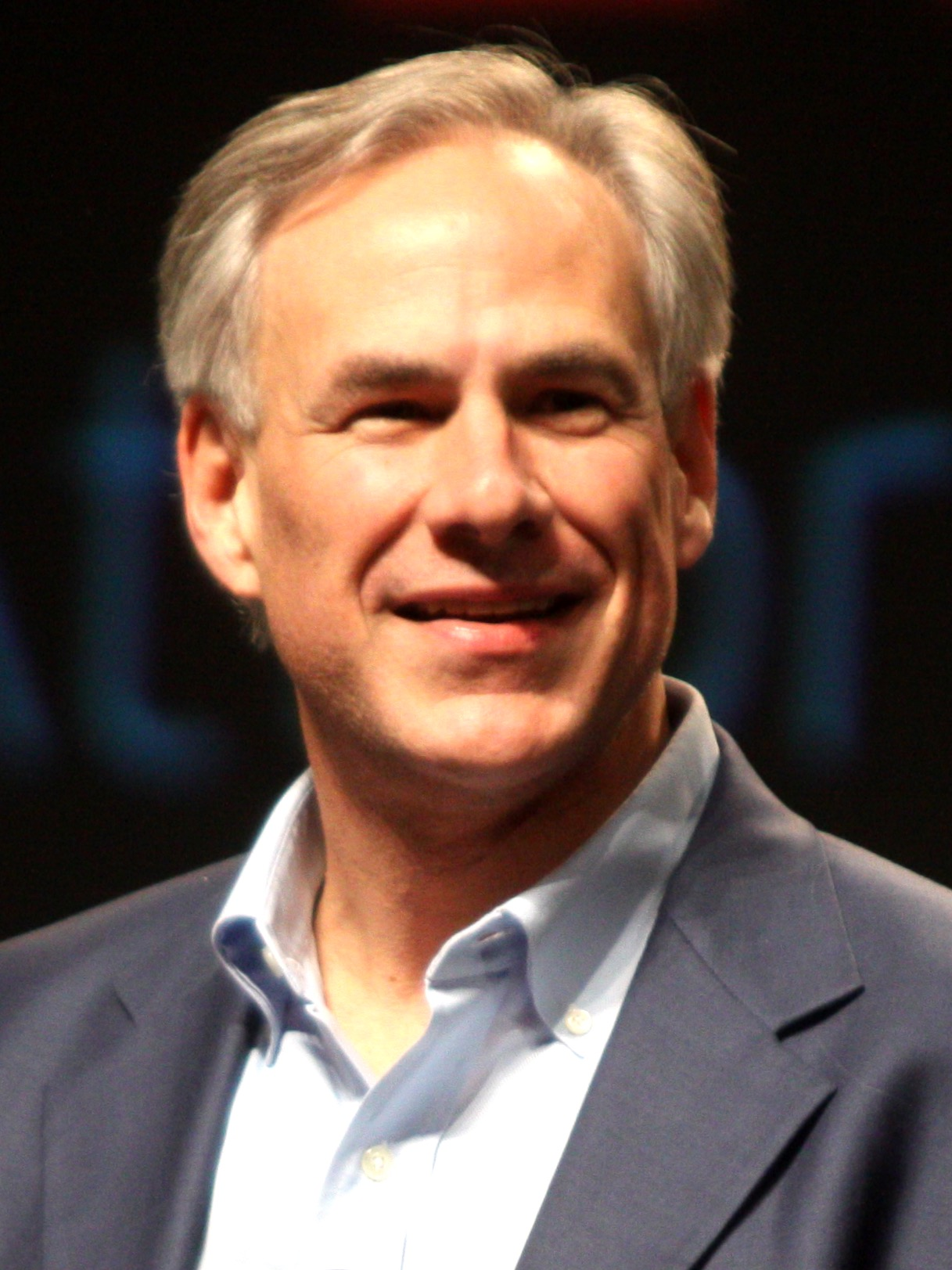

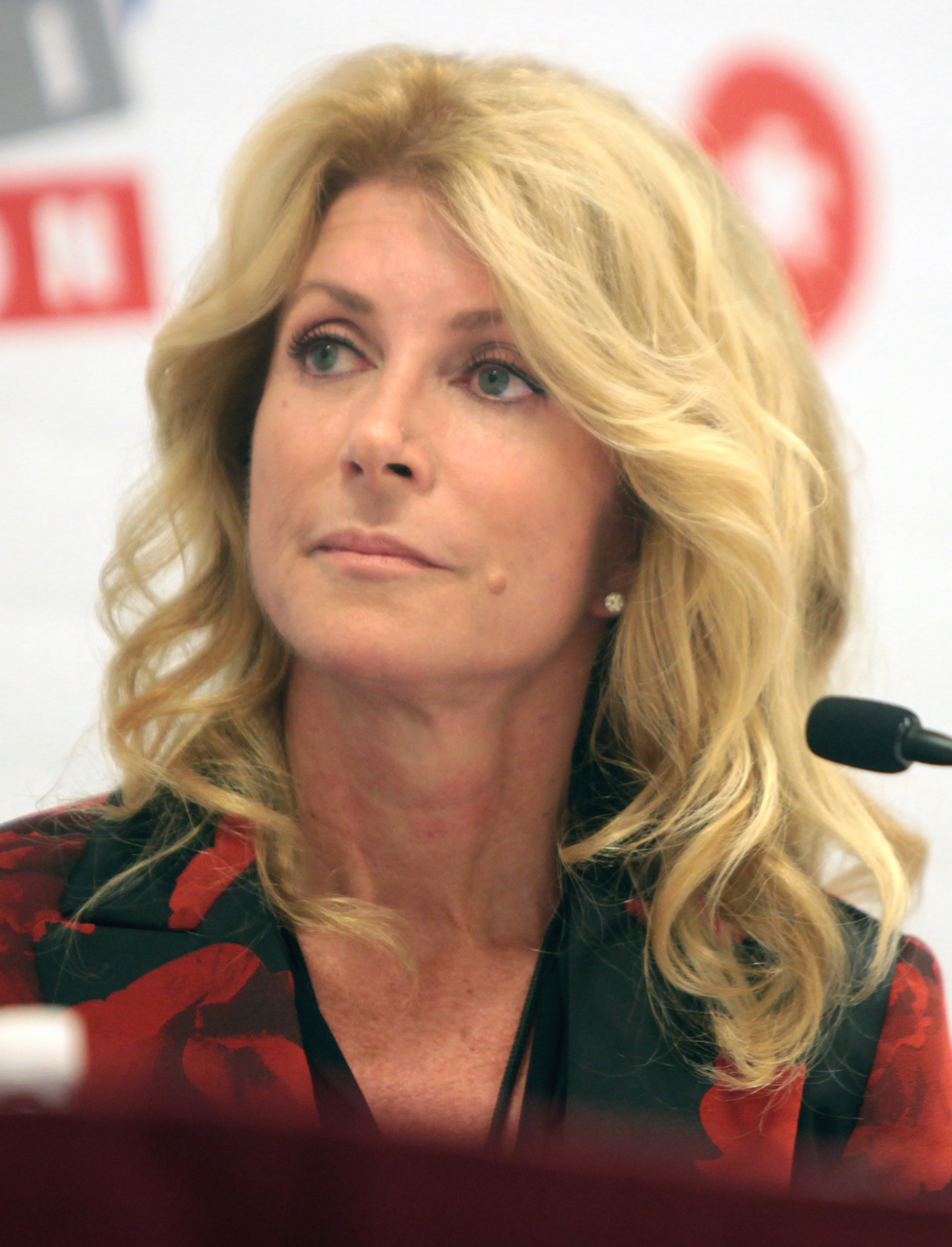
Nominee	Greg Abbott	Wendy Davis
Party	Republican	Democratic
Popular vote	2,796,547	1,835,596
Percentage	59.27%	38.90%
- Abbott: 40–50% 50–60% 60–70% 70–80% 80–90% >90% Davis: 40–50% 50–60% 60–70% 70–80% 80–90% >90% Tie: 40–50% 50% No data
Governor before election
Rick Perry
Republican
Elected Governor
Greg Abbott
Republican

The 2014 Texas gubernatorial election was held on November 4, 2014, to elect the governor of Texas. Incumbent Republican governor Rick Perry, who had served since the resignation of then-Governor George W. Bush on December 21, 2000, declined to run for an unprecedented fourth full term, making this the first open election for governor of the state since 1990.

The election took place between nominees who were selected on March 4, 2014: Republican State Attorney General Greg Abbott and Democratic State Senator Wendy Davis. Also on the ballot were Libertarian Party candidate Kathie Glass and Green Party candidate Brandon Parmer. Abbott was projected to carry the election, and ultimately won handily with a 20.4 percentage point advantage. As of 2022, this is the most recent gubernatorial election in which Bexar, Harris and Hays counties voted Republican. Exit polls showed Abbott winning Whites (72% to 25%), while Davis received majorities among African Americans (92% to 7%) and Hispanics (55% to 44%). Abbott won roughly half of Hispanic men, 54% of all women, and 62% of married women.

Abbott took office on January 20, 2015, as the 48th governor of Texas.

== Republican primary ==
=== Candidates ===
==== Declared ====
- Greg Abbott, attorney general of Texas
- Lisa Fritsch, author and radio show host
- Larry Kilgore, perennial candidate
- Miriam Martinez, former Univision personality

==== Withdrew ====
- Tom Pauken, former Texas Workforce Commissioner and former chairman of the Republican Party of Texas

==== Declined ====
- David Dewhurst, lieutenant governor of Texas (ran for re-election and lost the party primary runoff)
- Debra Medina, activist and candidate for governor of Texas in 2010 (running for Texas Comptroller of Public Accounts)
- Rick Perry, incumbent governor of Texas

=== Endorsements ===
Greg Abbott

Organizations

- Texas Municipal Police Association

Individuals

- Sarah Palin, former governor of Alaska and 2008 Republican vice presidential candidate
Tom Pauken

Organizations

- Citizens for the Republic

Individuals

- Mark Levin, talk radio host, lawyer, and author

=== Polling ===
Poll source	Date(s) administered	Sample size	Margin of error	Greg Abbott	Lisa Fritsch	Larry Kilgore	Miriam Martinez	Tom Pauken	Other	Undecided
UoT/Texas Tribune	February 7–17, 2014	461	± 4.56%	90%	4%	1%	5%	—	—	—
UoT/Texas Tribune	October 18–27, 2013	519	± 5.02%	50%	3%	1%	2%	2%	—	42%
Texas Lyceum	September 6–20, 2013	279	± 5.87%	22%	—	2%	1%	0%	—	74%

Hypothetical polling

Poll source	Date(s) administered	Sample size	Margin of error	Rick Perry	Greg Abbott	Someone else	Undecided
Public Policy Polling	June 28–July 1, 2013	318	± ?%	46%	34%	—	20%
Public Policy Polling	June 28–July 1, 2013	318	± ?%	44%	—	39%	17%
UoT/Texas Tribune	May 31–June 9, 2013	492	± 5.27%	45%	19%	11%	25%
UoT/Texas Tribune	February 15–24, 2013	549	± 4.18%	49%	17%	—	31%
Public Policy Polling	January 24–27, 2013	400	± 4.9%	47%	—	41%	13%
Public Policy Polling	January 24–27, 2013	400	± 4.9%	41%	38%	—	20%
Burnt Orange Report	May 15–16, 2012	462	± 4.6%	42%	35%	7%	16%

=== Results ===
Republican primary results
Party	Candidate	Votes	%
Republican	Greg Abbott	1,224,014	91.48
Republican	Lisa Fritsch	59,221	4.42
Republican	Miriam Martinez	35,585	2.65
Republican	Larry Kilgore	19,055	1.42
Total votes		1,337,875	100

== Democratic primary ==
=== Candidates ===
==== Declared ====
- Wendy Davis, state senator
- Ray Madrigal, perennial candidate

==== Declined ====
- Julian Castro, United States Secretary of Housing and Urban Development and former mayor of San Antonio
- Kinky Friedman, singer, songwriter, novelist, humorist and independent candidate for governor in 2006 (candidate in May 27 runoff for Texas Commissioner of Agriculture)
- Annise Parker, mayor of Houston
- Mike Villarreal, state representative
- Kirk Watson, state senator and former mayor of Austin
- Bill White, former mayor of Houston and nominee for governor in 2010

=== Endorsements ===
Wendy Davis

Politicians

- Julian Castro, United States Secretary of Housing and Urban Development and former mayor of San Antonio
- Howard Dean, former chair of the Democratic National Committee, former governor of Vermont, candidate for president in 2004

Organizations

- Democracy for America
- EMILY's List
- Human Rights Campaign

=== Polling ===
Poll source	Date(s) administered	Sample size	Margin of error	Wendy Davis	Ray Madrigal	Other	Undecided
UoT/Texas Tribune	February 7–17, 2014	263	± 6.04%	87%	13%	—	—

=== Results ===
Results by county: Davis—>90% Davis—80–90% Davis—70–80% Davis—60–70% Davis—50–60% Tie Madrigal—50–60% Madrigal—60–70% No vote

Democratic primary results
Party	Candidate	Votes	%
Democratic	Wendy Davis	432,595	78.08
Democratic	Ray Madrigal	121,419	21.91
Total votes		554,014	100

== Libertarian nomination ==
=== Candidates ===
==== Declared ====
- Robert Bell, pharmaceutical executive and chemist
- Robert Garrett, veteran, helicopter mechanic and prison officer
- Kathie Glass, attorney
- Robert "Star" Locke, rancher, building contractor, veteran and perennial candidate

==== Withdrew ====
- Gene Chapman, candidate for president of the United States in 2008
- R. Lee Wrights, vice chair of the Libertarian National Committee and candidate for president of the United States in 2012

=== Results ===
Kathie Glass was nominated at the 2014 party convention.

== Green nomination ==
=== Candidates ===
==== Declared ====
- Brandon Parmer, candidate for Texas's 6th congressional district in 2012

== Independents ==
=== Candidates ===
==== Declared ====
- Sarah M. Pavitt, Army veteran and cousin of former SOCOM commander William H. McRaven; ran as a write-in candidate

==== Declined ====
- Debra Medina, activist and Republican candidate for governor in 2010 (ran unsuccessfully for Texas Comptroller of Public Accounts)

== General election ==
=== Debates ===
The first of two confirmed gubernatorial debates between Wendy Davis and Greg Abbott took place at the Edinburg Conference Center at Renaissance at 18:00 on Friday, September 19, co-hosted by KGBT-TV, The Monitor and KTLM-TV. KGBT-TV posted the complete video online and can be viewed here. The debate took place in Edinburg, Texas, and it gave both candidates an opportunity to appeal to the Hispanic community, a grouping seen by Reuters as an "increasingly important voting bloc in Texas." The second debate took place on September 30 and was also posted online.

=== Predictions ===
Source	Ranking	As of
The Cook Political Report	Likely R	November 3, 2014
Sabato's Crystal Ball	Safe R	November 3, 2014
Rothenberg Political Report	Safe R	November 3, 2014
Real Clear Politics	Likely R	November 3, 2014

=== Polling ===
Poll source	Date(s) administered	Sample size	Margin of error	Greg Abbott (R)	Wendy Davis (D)	Other	Undecided
CBS News/NYT/YouGov	October 16–23, 2014	3,987	± 3%	57%	37%	0%	6%
UoT/Texas Tribune	October 10–19, 2014	866	± 3.6%	54%	38%	8%	—
Survey Research Center	September 22–October 16, 2014	781	± 3.5%	47%	32%	2%	17%
Crosswind Communications	October 9–12, 2014	500	± 4.33%	52%	31%	0%	16%
Rasmussen Reports	October 1–2, 2014	840	± 3.5%	51%	40%	3%	7%
CBS News/NYT/YouGov	September 20–October 1, 2014	4,177	± 2%	54%	40%	0%	5%
Texas Lyceum	September 11–25, 2014	666	± 3.8%	49%	40%	4%	8%
Benenson*	September 2–4, 2014	800	± 3.5%	46%	38%	—	16%
WPA Opinion Research^	September 3, 2014	?	± ?	53%	35%	—	12%
CBS News/NYT/YouGov	August 18–September 2, 2014	4,189	± 2%	56%	38%	2%	5%
Rasmussen Reports	August 4–5, 2014	850	± 3.5%	48%	40%	3%	9%
CBS News/NYT/YouGov	July 5–24, 2014	4,320	± 3.7%	54%	37%	1%	9%
UoT/Texas Tribune	May 30–June 8, 2014	1,200	± 2.83%	44%	32%	7%	17%
Texas Tech University	April 14–17, 2014	454	± 4.6%	54%	25%	6%	15%
Public Policy Polling	April 10–13, 2014	559	± 4.1%	51%	37%	—	13%
Emerson College	March 7–12, 2014	494	± ?	49%	42%	—	9%
Rasmussen Reports	March 3–4, 2014	500	± 4.5%	53%	41%	1%	4%
UoT/Texas Tribune	February 7–17, 2014	1,200	± 2.83%	47%	36%	—	17%
Public Policy Polling	November 1–4, 2013	500	± 4.4%	50%	35%	—	15%
Public Policy Polling	November 1–4, 2013	500	± 4.4%	47%	37%	9%	8%
UoT/Texas Tribune	October 18–27, 2013	1,200	± 3.3%	40%	34%	—	25%
UoT/Texas Tribune	October 18–27, 2013	1,200	± 3.3%	40%	35%	5%	20%
Texas Lyceum	September 6–20, 2013	798	± 3.47%	29%	21%	—	50%
Public Policy Polling	June 28–July 1, 2013	500	± 4.4%	48%	40%	—	12%
Public Policy Polling	January 24–27, 2013	400	± 4.9%	46%	34%	—	20%

Hypothetical polling

With Castro

Poll source	Date(s) administered	Sample size	Margin of error	Greg Abbott (R)	Julian Castro (D)	Other	Undecided
Public Policy Polling	June 28–July 1, 2013	500	± 4.4%	48%	34%	—	18%
Public Policy Polling	January 24–27, 2013	400	± 4.9%	46%	36%	—	18%

Poll source	Date(s) administered	Sample size	Margin of error	Rick Perry (R)	Julian Castro (D)	Other	Undecided
Public Policy Polling	June 28–July 1, 2013	500	± 4.4%	50%	43%	—	8%
Public Policy Polling	January 24–27, 2013	400	± 4.9%	47%	42%	—	11%

With Davis

Poll source	Date(s) administered	Sample size	Margin of error	Tom Pauken (R)	Wendy Davis (D)	Other	Undecided
UoT/Texas Tribune	October 18–27, 2013	1,200	± 3.3%	34%	38%	—	28%
UoT/Texas Tribune	October 18–27, 2013	1,200	± 3.3%	33%	36%	6%	25%

Poll source	Date(s) administered	Sample size	Margin of error	Rick Perry (R)	Wendy Davis (D)	Other	Undecided
Public Policy Polling	June 28–July 1, 2013	500	± 4.4%	53%	39%	—	8%
Public Policy Polling	January 24–27, 2013	400	± 4.9%	47%	41%	—	13%

With Parker

Poll source	Date(s) administered	Sample size	Margin of error	Greg Abbott (R)	Annise Parker (D)	Other	Undecided
Public Policy Polling	June 28–July 1, 2013	500	± 4.4%	50%	31%	—	20%
Public Policy Polling	January 24–27, 2013	400	± 4.9%	47%	35%	—	18%

Poll source	Date(s) administered	Sample size	Margin of error	Rick Perry (R)	Annise Parker (D)	Other	Undecided
Public Policy Polling	June 28–July 1, 2013	500	± 4.4%	52%	35%	—	13%
Public Policy Polling	January 24–27, 2013	400	± 4.9%	47%	40%	—	13%

With White

Poll source	Date(s) administered	Sample size	Margin of error	Greg Abbott (R)	Bill White (D)	Other	Undecided
Public Policy Polling	June 28–July 1, 2013	500	± 4.4%	48%	36%	—	16%
Public Policy Polling	January 24–27, 2013	400	± 4.9%	46%	39%	—	15%

Poll source	Date(s) administered	Sample size	Margin of error	Rick Perry (R)	Bill White (D)	Other	Undecided
Public Policy Polling	June 28–July 1, 2013	500	± 4.4%	50%	40%	—	10%
Public Policy Polling	January 24–27, 2013	400	± 4.9%	44%	47%	—	9%

- * Poll for the Wendy Davis campaign
- ^ Poll for the Greg Abbott campaign

=== Results ===
2014 Texas gubernatorial election
Party	Candidate	Votes	%	±%
Republican	Greg Abbott	2,796,547	59.27%	▲4.30
Democratic	Wendy Davis	1,835,596	38.90%	▼3.40
Libertarian	Kathie Glass	66,543	1.41%	▼0.78
Green	Brandon Parmer	18,520	0.39%	0.00
Independent	Sarah M. Pavitt (write-in)	1,062	0.02%	N/A
Total votes		4,718,268	100.0%	
Majority		960,951	20.37%	▲7.70
Turnout		4,718,268	38.38%	▼5.41
Republican hold				

==== Counties that flipped from Democratic to Republican ====
- Bexar (largest city: San Antonio)
- Culberson (largest municipality: Van Horn)
- Falls (largest city: Marlin)
- Foard (largest city: Crowell)
- Harris (largest community: Houston)
- Kleberg (largest municipality: Kingsville)
- La Salle (largest municipality: Cotulla)
- Reeves (largest municipality: Pecos)
- Trinity (largest city: Trinity)

==== By congressional district ====
Abbott won 25 of 36 congressional districts. (Note: Not including third party candidates.)

District	Abbott	Davis	Representative
1st	77%	23%	Louie Gohmert
2nd	64%	36%	Ted Poe
3rd	66%	34%	Sam Johnson
4th	77%	23%	Ralph Hall (113th Congress)
4th	77%	23%	John Ratcliffe (114th Congress)
5th	67%	33%	Jeb Hensarling
6th	59%	41%	Joe Barton
7th	61%	39%	John Culberson
8th	79%	21%	Kevin Brady
9th	24%	76%	Al Green
10th	60%	40%	Michael McCaul
11th	85%	15%	Mike Conaway
12th	66%	34%	Kay Granger
13th	84%	16%	Mac Thornberry
14th	61%	39%	Randy Weber
15th	47%	53%	Rubén Hinojosa
16th	40%	60%	Beto O'Rourke
17th	64%	36%	Bill Flores
18th	24%	76%	Sheila Jackson Lee
19th	82%	18%	Randy Neugebauer
20th	43%	57%	Joaquín Castro
21st	60%	40%	Lamar Smith
22nd	65%	35%	Pete Olson
23rd	57%	43%	Pete Gallego (113th Congress)
23rd	57%	43%	Will Hurd (114th Congress)
24th	63%	37%	Kenny Marchant
25th	60%	40%	Roger Williams
26th	69%	31%	Michael Burgess
27th	65%	35%	Blake Farenthold
28th	46%	54%	Henry Cuellar
29th	37%	63%	Gene Green
30th	21%	79%	Eddie Bernice Johnson
31st	63%	37%	John Carter
32nd	58%	42%	Pete Sessions
33rd	30%	70%	Marc Veasey
34th	47%	53%	Filemon Vela Jr.
35th	36%	64%	Lloyd Doggett
36th	76%	24%	Steve Stockman (113th Congress)
36th	76%	24%	Brian Babin (114th Congress)

== See also ==
- 2014 United States gubernatorial elections
- 2014 United States House of Representatives elections in Texas
- 2014 United States Senate election in Texas
- 2014 Texas elections
