= Konstantin Paustovsky =

Russian writer (1892–1968)

- Константин Паустовский
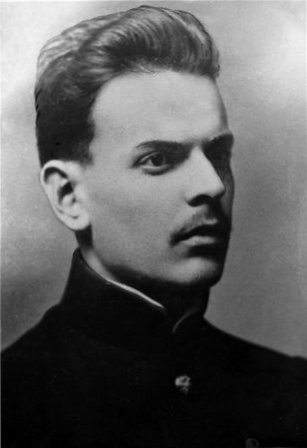
- Born: 31 May 1892; Moscow, Russian Empire
- Died: 14 July 1968 (aged 76); Moscow, Russian SFSR, Soviet Union
- Writing career
- Movement: Neo-romanticism

Konstantin Georgiyevich Paustovsky (Russian: Константин Георгиевич Паустовский, pronounced [pəʊˈstofskʲɪj]; 31 May [O.S. 19 May] 1892 – 14 July 1968) was a Soviet writer nominated for the Nobel Prize in Literature in 1965, 1966, 1967, and 1968.

== Early life ==
Konstantin Paustovsky was born in Moscow. His father was a railroad statistician, and was “an incurable romantic and Protestant”. His mother came from the family of Polish intelligentsia. Paustovsky's family were of Zaporozhian Cossack, Turkish and Polish origin.

As Paustovsky noted in his autobiography, his grandfather Maxim had in his youth served in the army of Czar Nicholas I, was captured during a war with the Ottoman Empire and held as a prisoner of war in the town of Kazanlak (now in Bulgaria). During his captivity there, Maxim met a local Turkish young woman who eventually married him, accompanied him to the Russian Empire and became the mother of his children and Konstantin Paustovsky's grandmother. According to Paustovsky, his grandmother's original name was Fatma, but when she converted to Christianity she took the name Honorata.

Konstantin grew up in Russian Empire, partly in the countryside and partly in Kiev. He studied in “the First Imperial” classical Gymnasium of Kiev, where he was the classmate of Mikhail Bulgakov. When he was in the 6th grade his father left the family and he was forced to give private lessons in order to earn a living. In 1912 he entered the faculty of Natural History in University of Kiev. In 1914 he transferred to the Law faculty of the University of Moscow, but World War I interrupted his education.

At first he worked as a trolley-man in Moscow, then as a paramedic in a hospital train. During 1915, his medical unit retreated all the way through Poland and Belarus. After two of his brothers died on the front line, he returned to his mother in Moscow but later left and wandered around, trying his hands at many jobs, initially working in the metallurgical factories in Yekaterinoslav and Yuzovka. In 1916 he lived in Taganrog, where he worked at the Taganrog Boiler Factory (now: Krasny Kotelschchik).

Later he joined a cooperative association of fishermen (artel) in Taganrog, where he started his first novel Романтики ("Romantiki", Romantics) which was published in 1935. The novel, whose content and feelings are reflected in its title, described what he had seen and felt in his youth. One of the heroes, the old Oscar, was an artist who resisted all of his life being forced to become a moneymaker. He returned to the main theme of Romantics, the destiny of an artist who strives to overcome his loneliness, and his experiences in Taganrog in later works, including Разговор о рыбе (“Razgovor o ribe”, Conversation about the Fish), Азовское подполье (“Azovskoe podpolie”, Azov Underground) and Порт в траве (“Port v trave”, Seaport in The Grass).

== Novels and poetry ==
Paustovsky began writing while still in Gymnasium. His first works were imitative poetry but he restricted his writing to prose after Ivan Bunin wrote in a letter to him: "I think that your sphere, your real poetry, is prose. It is here, if you are determined enough, that I am sure you can achieve something significant." His first stories to be published were “Na vode” (“On The Water”) and “Chetvero” (“The Four”) in 1911 and 1912. During World War I, he wrote sketches of life at the front, one of which was published. His first book, Morskiye Nabroski (“Sea Sketches”), was published in 1925, but received little attention. This was followed by Minetoza in 1927, and the romantic novel Blistaiushie Oblaka (“Shining Clouds”) in 1929. His work of this period was influenced by Alexander Grin as well as the writers of the "Odessa school", (Isaac Babel, Valentin Kataev, and Yury Olesha). In the 1930s, Paustovsky visited various constructions sites and wrote in praise of the industrial transformation of the country. To that period belong the novels Kara-Bugaz (1932) and Kolkhida (1934). Kara-Bugaz won particular praise. It is essentially a tale of adventure and exploration in the region around Kara-Bugaz Bay, where the air is mysteriously heavy. It begins in 1847 and moves to the Russian Civil War period when a group of Red Guards is abandoned to near-certain death on a desolate island. Some of them, though do survive and are rescued by an explorer and stay on to help in the exploration, development and study of the natural wealth of the region.

Paustovsky continued to explore historical themes in Severnaya Povest ("Tale of the North", 1938). In this tale, after the anti-Tsarist Decembrist uprising in Saint Petersburg, a wounded officer who had taken part in the uprising and a sailor try to make it by foot across the ice to Sweden but are captured in a sequence of dramatic events. Years later, in Leningrad in the 1930s, the great-grandsons of the participants unexpectedly meet. In the late 1930s, Russian nature emerged as a central theme for Paustovsky, for example, in Letniye Dni ("Summer Days", 1937) and Meshcherskaya Storona (1939) in which he treats nature was a many-faceted splendor in which man can free himself from daily cares and regain his spiritual equilibrium. This focus on nature drew comparisons with Mikhail Prishvin. Prishvin himself wrote in his diary, "If I were not Prishvin, I would like to write like Paustovsky."

During World War II Paustovsky served as a war correspondent on the southern front. In 1943 he produced a screenplay for the Gorky Film Studio production of Lermontov, directed by Albert Gendelshtein. Another work of note is Tale of the Woods (1948). This story opens in a remote forest in the 1890s, where Pyotr Ilyich Tchaikovsky is composing a symphony. The young daughter of a local forester often brings Tchaikovsky berries. Half a century later, the daughter of this girl is a laboratory technician working in the local forest station.

From 1948 until 1955, Paustovsky taught at the Maxim Gorky Literature Institute. He also edited literary collections including Literary Moscow (1956) and Pages from Tarusa, in which he sought to bring new writers to the public's attention and to publish writers suppressed during the Joseph Stalin years.

Other major works include Snow, Crossing Ships (1928); The Black Sea (1936); and The Rainy Dawn (1946). Paustovsky was also the author of several plays and fairy tales, including "Steel Ring" and of Zolotaya Rosa "The Golden Rose" (1955), in which he discusses the process of literary creation.

== Autobiography ==
Perhaps Paustovsky's most famous work is his six-volume autobiography “Povest o Zhizni” (“Story of a Life”), written between 1945 and 1963. It is not a strictly historical document but rather a long, lyrical tale focusing on the internal perceptions and poetic development of the writer. It has been called a "biography of the soul" rather than a biography of events. Nonetheless, it does provide a unique view of life in Russia during the turbulent years of World War I, the Russian Civil War and rise of the Soviets, all of which Paustovsky participated in.

In 1964, Joseph Barnes translated the first three volumes for Pantheon Books under the title The Story of a Life. Pantheon published the fourth volume in Harari and Thomson's translation in 1969. The text of the first three volumes was reprinted in 1982.

Between 1964 and 1974, Harvill Press published a complete English translation by various translators under the series title Story of a Life.

- Volume 1: Childhood and Schooldays ("Далекие годы", 1946), trans. Manya Harari and Michael Duncan, pub. 1964
- Volume 2: Slow Approach of Thunder ("Беспокойная юность", 1954), trans. Manya Harari and Michael Duncan, pub. 1965
- Volume 3: In That Dawn ("Начало неведомого века", 1956), trans. Manya Harari and Michael Duncan, pub. 1967
- Volume 4: Years of Hope ("Время больших ожиданий", 1958), trans. Manya Harari and Andrew Thomson, pub. 1968
- Volume 5: Southern Adventure ("Бросок на юг", 1959–60), trans. Kyril Fitz-Lyon, pub. 1969
- Volume 6: The Restless Years ("Книга скитаний", 1963), trans. Kyril Fitz-Lyon, pub. 1974

In 2022 and 2023 respectively, Vintage Classics in the UK and New York Review Books in the US published a new translation by Douglas Smith of the first three volumes under the title The Story of a Life. The translated volumes are: "The Faraway Years", "Restless Youth", and "The Dawn of an Uncertain Age". In his introduction, Smith noted that volumes five and six of the original publication were bowdlerized by Soviet editors.

== Nobel prize nomination ==
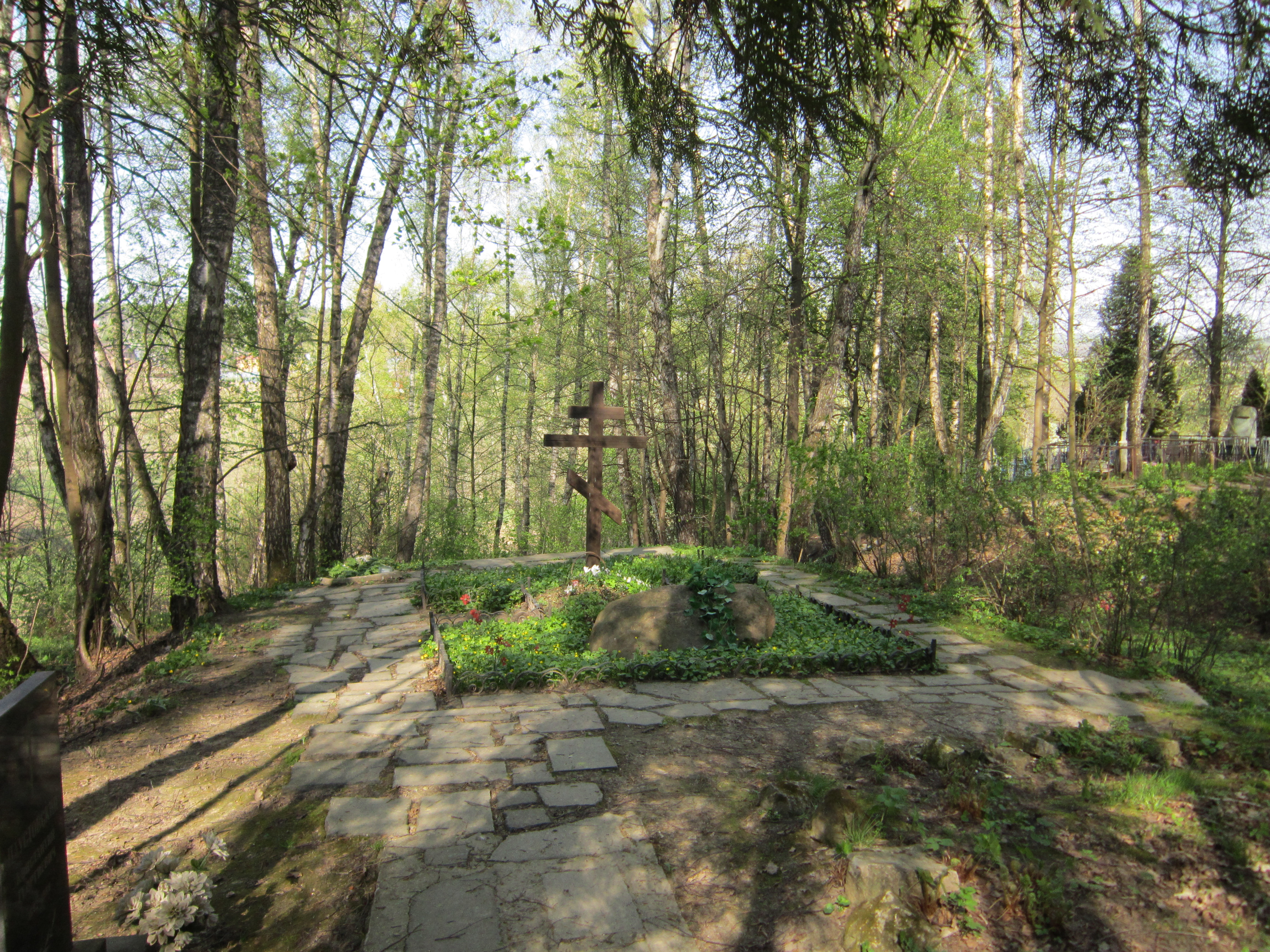
Tombstone of Paustovsky in Tarusa

In 1965, Paustovsky was nominated for a Nobel Prize in Literature, the prize was awarded instead to Mikhail Sholokhov.

In February 1966 he was one of the 25 prominent figures from science and the arts who signed a letter to the 23rd Congress of the Communist Party of the Soviet Union, appealing against re-Stalinization in the wake of the Sinyavsky–Daniel trial.

He died in Moscow on 14 July 1968.

== Quotes ==
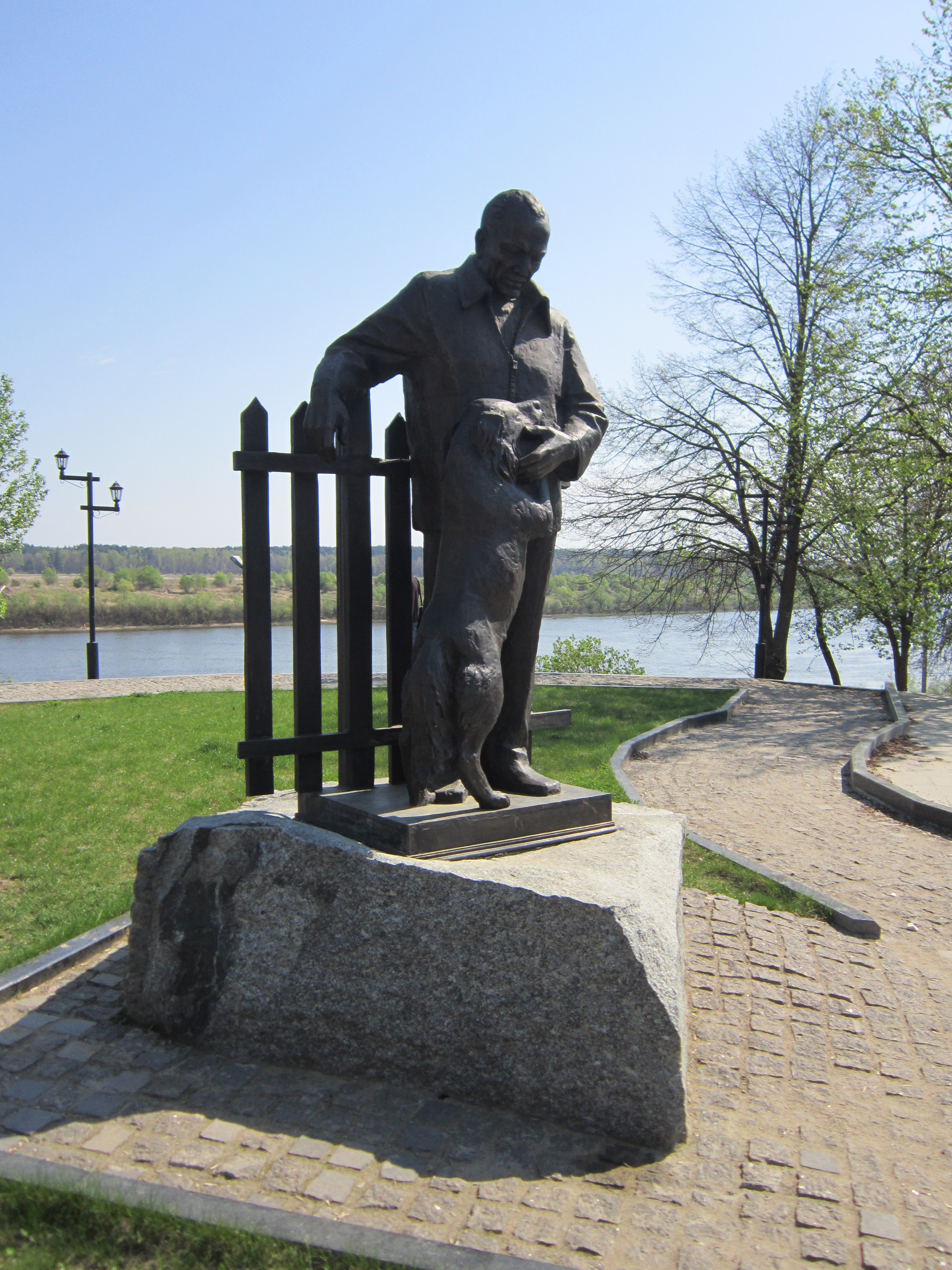
Monument of Paustovsky in Tarusa

- Anticipation of happy days is sometimes much better than those days.
- A Man must be smart, unpretentious, fair, courageous and kind. Only then he can be entitled to be called a Man.
- Let's just not talk about love. We still don't know what it is.
- If we deprive man of his ability to dream, one of the greatest motives that drives culture, arts, science and desire to fight for the beautiful future will fall away.
- "From the book of dream interpretations": if a poet saw in a dream his money coming to an end -is that's for new poetry.
- Savrasov paintedThe Rooks Have Come Back quickly - he was afraid the rooks would fly away.
- The favorite theme of Chekhov: There was a wonderful and healthy forest which a forester was invited to take care of, the forest quickly withered and died.
- Assiduity is also a talent. Some writers should be photographed (from) the rear end instead of full face.
- Turgenev lacked the health of Leo Tolstoy and the disease of Dostoevsky.
- I believe that the foundations of literature are imagination and memories, that's why I never use notebooks. When you take a phrase from your book of notes, and put it into the text that you're writing in a different moment of time and in a different mood, that phrase shrivels and dies. I recognize notebooks only as a genre.

== Sources ==
- Frank Westerman, Engineers of the Soul, Overlook Press, 2011.
