= Manya Harari =

British translator

- Born: Manya Benenson; 8 April 1905; Russian Empire
- Died: 24 September 1969 (aged 64)
- Known for: British translator of Russian literature, co-founder of Harvill Press.

Manya Harari (née Manya Benenson) (8 April 1905 – 24 September 1969) was a British translator of Russian literature and the co-founder of Harvill Press. Her best-known work is the translation of Boris Pasternak's epic novel Doctor Zhivago, which she co-translated with Max Hayward. She also translated works by Konstantin Paustovsky, Andrey Sinyavsky, Ilya Ehrenburg and Evgenia Ginzburg, among others.

== Early life ==
Born in the Russian Empire, as the fourth child and youngest daughter of Jewish financier Grigori Benenson (1860–1939) and Sophie Goldberg (1862–1926), she migrated in 1914 with her family to London from Germany, where they had been visiting. She had three siblings, an older brother Jacob who died in a German concentration camp during the First World War, and two sisters, Flora Solomon and Fira Benenson (Countess Ilinska) who became a leading American dress designer.

== Education ==
She was educated at Malvern Girls College and at Bedford College, London, where she read history, graduating in 1924.

In 1946 she co-founded the Harvill Press with Marjorie Villiers.

== Selected books ==
=== Translations ===
- Involuntary Journey to Siberia by Andrei Amalrik (co-translator: Max Hayward)
- The Thaw by Ilya Ehrenburg
- Into the Whirlwind by Evgenia Ginzburg (co-translator: Paul Stevenson)
- The Demonstration in Pushkin Square by Pavel Litvinov
- The Decline of Wisdom by Gabriel Marcel
- The Philosophy of Exisentialism by Gabriel Marcel
- An Essay in Autobiography by Boris Pasternak
- Doctor Zhivago by Boris Pasternak (co-translator: Max Hayward)
- The Blind Beauty: A Play by Boris Pasternak (co-translator: Max Hayward)
- Story of a Life (first four volumes with Michael Duncan and Andrew Thomson) by Konstantin Paustovsky
- Unguarded Thoughts by Andrey Sinyavsky
- The Makepeace Experiment by Abram Tertz

=== Autobiography ===
- Memoirs 1906-1969

== Personal life ==
In Paris in 1925 Manya Benenson married Ralph Andrew Harari (1893–1969), a merchant banker, art scholar and collector, son of Sir Victor Harari Pasha and Emma Aghion, leading members of Egypt's Anglo-Jewish community. They had met in Palestine earlier that year. They initially lived in Cairo where Manya studied the poor living conditions. In 1932, she converted to Roman Catholicism.

The couple later settled in London and were known for their hospitality at their London home 32 Catherine Place, Westminster. The couple had one son, Michael Harari, born in England in 1928, who later became a psychiatrist.

Manya Harari died on 24 September 1969 and was buried with her husband at East Finchley Cemetery and Crematorium.
