= The Black Book of Soviet Jewry =

1944 Russian-language compilation by Ilya Ehrenburg and Vasily Grossman

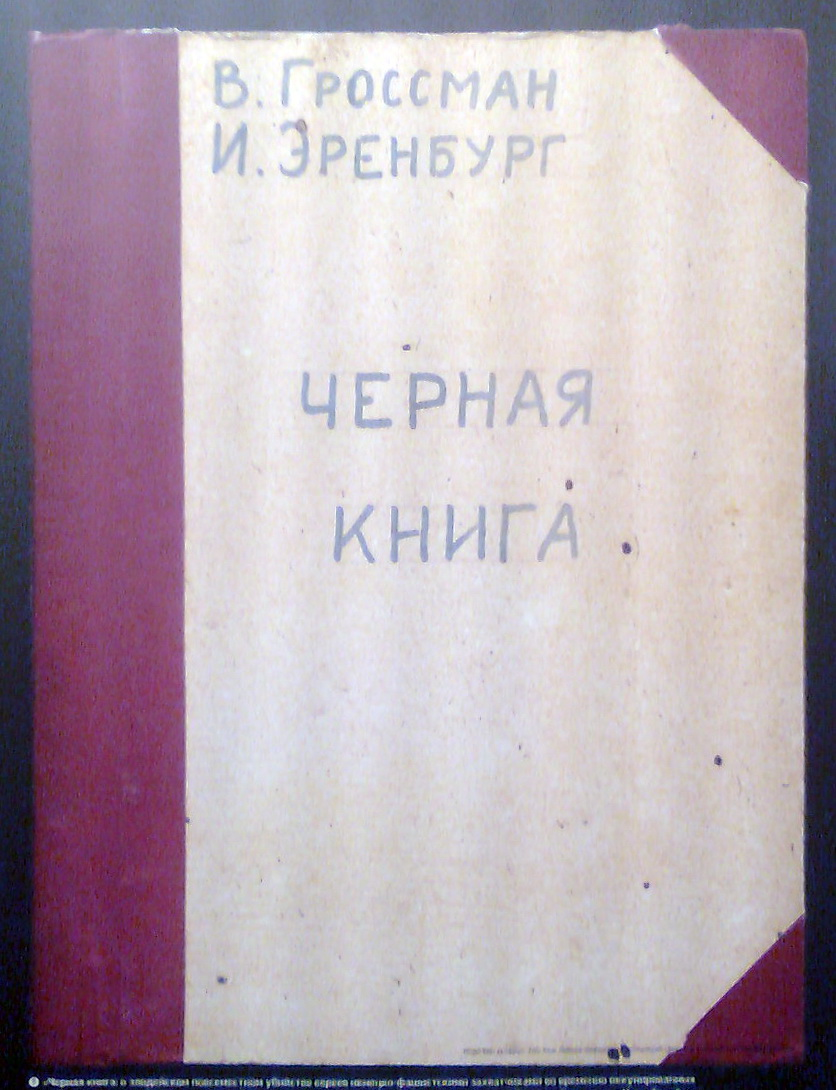

The Black Book of Soviet Jewry or simply The Black Book (Russian: Чёрная Кни́га, romanized: Chyórnaya Kníga, IPA: [ˈt͡ɕɵrnəjə ˈknʲiɡə]; Yiddish: דאָס שוואַרצע בוך, Dos shvartse bukh), also known as The Complete Black Book of Russian Jewry, is a 500-page document compiled for publication by Ilya Ehrenburg and Vasily Grossman originally in late 1944 in the Russian language. It was a result of the collaborative effort by the Jewish Anti-Fascist Committee (JAC) and members of the American Jewish community to document the anti-Jewish crimes of the Holocaust and the participation of Jews in the resistance movement against the Nazis during World War II. The 1991 Kiev edition of The Black Book was subtitled The Ruthless Murder of Jews by German-Fascist Invaders Throughout the Temporarily-Occupied Regions of the Soviet Union and in the German Nazi Death Camps established on occupied Polish soil during the War 1941–1945.

The book was not allowed to be published in the Soviet Union upon the conclusion of the war. Its insistence on the uniqueness of Jewish suffering – above and beyond the rest of Soviet citizenry – was denounced by the Central Committee as anti-Soviet.

== Background ==
Prominent Jewish Soviet writers and journalists Ilya Ehrenburg and Vasily Grossman served as war reporters for the Red Army. Grossman's documentary reports of the opening of the Treblinka and Majdanek extermination camps were some of the first eyewitness accounts — as early as 1943 — of what later became known as the Holocaust. His article The Treblinka Hell was disseminated at the Nuremberg trials as a document for the prosecution.

== Manuscripts and publications ==
In 1944–1945, based on their own experiences and on other documents they collected, Ehrenburg and Grossman produced two volumes under the title Murder of the People in Yiddish and handed the manuscript to the JAC. Copies were sent to the United States, the British mandate of Palestine (now Israel) and Romania in 1946, and excerpts were published in the United States in English under the title Black Book that same year. In Romania, a part of the manuscript was also published in 1946. It was also printed in Israel. A handwritten manuscript of the book is held at Yad Vashem.

== The fate of the Black Book in the USSR ==
According to Ehrenburg, the mandatory State literary commission did not commit to publish the book in October 1944: "Instead of a straight answer, the resolution was:

write the book, and if it comes out well, it would be published.' But it is not we who are the authors, it is the fascists ... What does that mean, 'comes out well' this is not a novel, it is a document.

The book was partially printed in the Soviet Union by the state Yiddish publisher Der Emes; however, the entire edition, the typefaces, as well as the manuscript, were destroyed. First the censors ordered changes in the text to conceal the specifically anti-Jewish character of the atrocities and to downplay the role of some Ukrainians who worked as Nazi police officers. In 1948 the Soviet edition of the book was scrapped completely. The collection of original documents that Ehrenburg handed down to the Vilnius Jewish Museum after the war was secretly returned to him upon the Museum's termination in 1948. The JAC was also disbanded, its members purged at the outset of the state campaign against the "rootless cosmopolitans".

Typically, the official Soviet policy regarding the Holocaust was to present it as atrocities committed against Soviet citizens, without specifically acknowledging the genocide of the Jews. Though the genocide of Jews was not completely ignored, written publications about it were tightly controlled in order to make sure that their narratives conformed to the Soviet government's Marxist-Leninist ideology.

A Russian-language edition of the Black Book was published in Jerusalem in 1980, and finally in Kiev, Ukraine in 1991.

The new Russian-language edition of the Black Book was published in 2014 by Editions Corpus with the help of Planeta.ru, a Russian crowdfunding site.

== See also ==
- History of the Jews in the Soviet Union
- The Black Book of Polish Jewry
- The Black Book of Communism
