= The Thaw (novel) =

1954 novel by Ilya Ehrenburg

- Author: Ilya Ehrenburg
- Original title: Ottepel
- Translator: Manya Harari
- Publisher: Regnery, Harvill Press
- Publication date: 1954
- English publication date: 1955
- Media type: Novel

The Thaw (Russian: Оттепель, romanized: Ottepel) is a short novel by Ilya Ehrenburg first published in the spring 1954 issue of Novy Mir. It coined the name for the Khrushchev Thaw, the period of liberalization following the 1953 death of Stalin. The novel marked a break both from Ehrenburg's earlier purely pro-Soviet work, and from previous ideas about socialist realism.

== Summary ==
The novel follows three main characters: Ivan Vasilievich Zhuravlev, a despotic factory manager, Vladimir Andreevich Pukhov, a painter working for the government, and Saburov, an unsuccessful colleague of Pukhov. Other characters include Vera Sherer, a Jewish doctor who is accused in the "doctors' plot".

== Reception ==
The novel was very successful, selling all 45,000 copies of the first edition in a single day.

It drew criticism from the authorities for mentioning the Great Purge and other negative aspects of Stalinism; in late 1954 the Second Congress of Soviet Writers harshly criticized it, along with Vera Panova's novel The Seasons and Leonid Zorin's play Guests. Konstantin Simonov, then secretary of the Union of Writers of the USSR, accused Ehrenburg "of caricaturing ... artistic life." However, Ehrenburg was given a chance to defend himself in the Literaturnaya Gazeta.

It was translated into English by Manya Harari and published in 1955 by Regnery in the US and Harvill Press in the UK.
