= Harry letters affair =

Harry has developed a sudden enthusiasm for litigation. What with North Hull Harry wants a fair buzz of legal activity. Harry's financial problems apparently have been solved and he's in a generous mood.

— Extract from a "Harry" letter, dated 2 February 1966, just after the Labour Party's by-election victory in Kingston upon Hull North

The "Harry" letters, written by Peter Benenson, founder of the international human rights group Amnesty International, detail the funding during 1966 of Amnesty's mission in the Rhodesian capital, Salisbury, by somebody or something referred to as "Harry", which was commonly interpreted as code for the British government, which was headed by British Prime Minister Harold Wilson. The letters were made public in March 1967 by Polly Toynbee, an Englishwoman who had worked for Amnesty in Salisbury as a 19-year-old gap year student in early 1966. Scandal resulted within both the British government and Amnesty, and Benenson left the group soon afterward.

With Amnesty in Rhodesia, Toynbee became suspicious of the disproportionately-large amounts of money apparently at the disposal of Amnesty's mission there and the modest scale of Amnesty's operations in both Rhodesia and Nigeria. Toynbee asked Benenson about the origin of the money and pressed him on rumours that Britain was funding Amnesty's mission in Salisbury. According to her, he admitted it and referred to it as "Operation Lordship". That ran at odds with Amnesty's claimed apolitical stance.

Toynbee then acquired a set of letters that appeared to confirm her suspicions. Addressed to an Amnesty official in Salisbury, they described efforts to gain external financing for the Rhodesia mission. Toynbee made the existence of the letters public in March 1967 and alleged that Amnesty had been "bought off" by Whitehall.

When questioned in Parliament on payments by the government to Amnesty, Wilson said that his administration had indeed been "approached by a member of the organisation" and had given a list of possible financial donors in response. Amnesty claimed that any such activities had been unilaterally conducted by Benenson on his own accord and denied any collective wrongdoing. Benenson held that the money had been intended for Rhodesian political prisoners and their families and said that the British government had wished for the payments to be kept secret for political reasons.

== Rhodesia mission ==
Polly Toynbee in 2005

In early 1966, during her gap year from studies at the University of Oxford, Polly Toynbee served as the secretary for the peer and former West Indian cricketer Learie Constantine on an Amnesty International mission to Nigeria and Rhodesia, two countries in Africa. (Note: Following its 1965 Unilateral Declaration of Independence, Rhodesia regarded itself as an independent country, but Britain and the United Nations held that it was still a British colony.) In Lagos, the capital of Nigeria, Toynbee and the other Amnesty members were supposed to be helping political detainees, but Toynbee recalled, "We sat around drinking and entertaining the press. We must have spent an enormous amount but we never achieved anything. We never saw anyone important. We just got vague assurances that the prisoners were all right." The mission then went on to Rhodesia, where the predominantly-white minority government under Ian Smith had unilaterally declared independence the previous November. Since the declaration of independence, there had been reports of mass arrests of black nationalist leaders.

During Toynbee's six weeks in Salisbury, she and other volunteers dispensed funds to the families of political detainees and tried to arrange legal aid for the prisoners. Toynbee claimed that Amnesty's operations in both Nigeria and Rhodesia were little more than nominal and became suspicious of the financial situation surrounding the Salisbury mission in particular. Amnesty then had a modest budget for such a prominent organisation since it operated out of founder Peter Benenson's cramped legal chambers, and during the financial year 1965–66, it boasted an annual budget of only £7,000. However, Toynbee said she found that there was, in her own words, a seemingly "endless supply of money. I could go to the bank and draw out £200 at a time. And there was no check on what I did with the money." When Benenson visited the group in Salisbury, Toynbee asked him where the funds came from and said there were rumours flying around the city that it was coming from Whitehall, the British government. According to Toynbee, Benenson said the British government was indeed supplying money. He reportedly described the transactions as "Operation Lordship".

== Letters revealed ==
Toynbee and others were expelled from Rhodesia in March 1966 for refusing information to the British South Africa Police. While she was there, however, Toynbee acquired some letters that she said had been abandoned in a safe. The letters appeared to have been written in London by Benenson between January and March 1966. Some were typed, and others were in his handwriting. Alternately signed "Margaret" or "Peter" and addressed to the Amnesty representative in Salisbury, they contained frequent references to somebody or something called "Harry", which Toynbee interpreted as code for the British government.

Many of the letters contained detailed requests for payments and funding. One of them, dated 2 February 1966, included this passage: "What with North Hull Harry wants a fair buzz of legal activity. Harry's financial problems apparently have been solved and he's in a generous mood." Toynbee construed that as a reference to the previous month's Kingston upon Hull North by-election, which had increased the Labour government's majority in the House of Commons from three to four members. Toynbee's interest was aroused as Amnesty took pride in its declared apolitical stance, a concept very much at odds with the idea of funding from a national government.

On 5 March 1967, Toynbee revealed the existence of the letters in newspaper interviews. She claimed that Amnesty had been "bought off" by the British government: "Instead of dealing with legal test cases," she said, "it is wasting its time on welfare work which could equally well be done by the Red Cross".

== Fallout ==
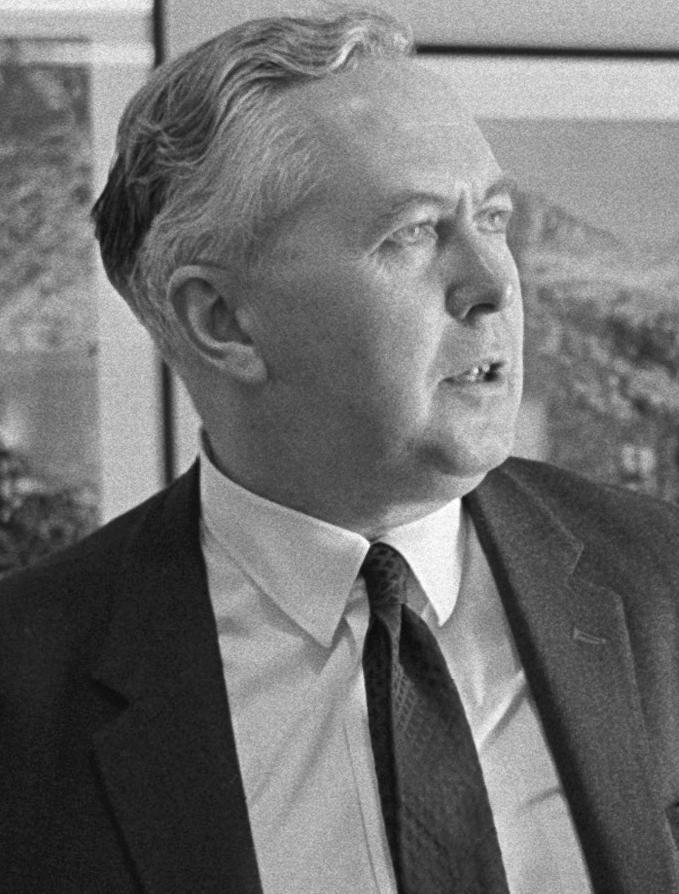
British Prime Minister Harold Wilson admitted the British government's involvement in the affair in the House of Commons.

The letters' public appearance caused a scandal. Amnesty distanced itself from the Rhodesia mission and claimed that any such activities had been unilaterally undertaken by Benenson alone. On 9 March, in the House of Commons, British Prime Minister Harold Wilson answered a parliamentary question on the letters from Knox Cunningham, who asked whether or not the "payments made to Amnesty International were made with his [Wilson's] authority; for what reason such payments were made; and what was the total amount paid by Her Majesty's Government during 1966 to Amnesty International". Wilson replied that the government had been "approached by a member of the organisation concerned for the humanitarian purpose of helping the families of men who have been oppressively detained. We thought it right to suggest possible donors who might be willing to help".

Benenson contended that the money had been for the prisoners and their families and had not been gifted to Amnesty by the British government. He insisted that the government had wished the payments to remain secret for political reasons. A private letter written by Benenson two months before Toynbee's interviews said that a third party, the hotelier Charles Forte, had been asked by Whitehall to provide £10,000 for the Rhodesia mission. In his letter, Benenson appeared to imply that Forte's donation might lead to an honour from the British government. Benenson later returned the money to avoid jeopardising the political reputation of the government members involved in the payments.

Following a state of crisis, Amnesty held a meeting in Denmark in March 1967 at which Benenson's resignation was accepted. Benenson resigned on the grounds that Amnesty's offices had been bugged by the British government. In a report, Amnesty Chairman Seán MacBride referred to Benenson's "erratic activities" and "unilateral decisions". Benenson responded by demanding MacBride's resignation and pointed out that the American Central Intelligence Agency had funded the International Commission of Jurists of which MacBride was Secretary-General. The relationship between Amnesty and the British government was suspended.

Amnesty vowed future impartiality and said that it "must not only be independent and impartial but it must not be put into a position where anything else could even be alleged". Whitehall concurrently switched its stance towards Amnesty from one of co-operation to "one of reserve".
