= Fira Benenson =

American fashion designer

- 1941
- Born: 14 April 1898; Baku, Russian Empire
- Died: 23 October 1977 (aged 79); New York City, New York
- Other name: Fira Ilinska
- Occupations: fashion designer, dressmaker
- Years active: 1930–1969

Fira Benenson (14 April 1898 – 23 October 1977) was a Russian-born American fashion designer and dressmaker. After growing up in Baku and Saint Petersburg, her family left Russia at the end of World War I and relocated in London. Benenson grew up between London, Paris and New York City, immigrating to Manhattan in the late 1920s. Opening a dress shop, she gained a reputation as a designer and was hired by Bonwit Teller in 1934. When World War II prohibited participation in the Paris fashion industry, she and other American designers began creating their own fashion lines. Leaving Bonwit's in 1948, she operated her own company, designing into 1969 and inspiring a new generation of American designers.

== Early life ==
Fira Benenson was born on 14 April 1898 in Baku, which at the time was located in the Russian Empire, as the middle daughter of Sophia Borisovna (née Goldberg, Russian: София Борисовна Голдберг, 1862–1926) and Grigori Benenson (1860–1939) (Russian: Григорий Иосифович Бененсон), a Jewish financier and oil magnate. Her mother was born in Pinsk and her father was born in Minsk to a wealthy timber merchant and had begun his career managing his father's estates. In 1889, he moved with his wife and young son, Jacob (1885–?) to Baku, opening a rice processing plant, which was the first in the area and began exporting rice in the domestic market. Within a decade, he bought a kerosene plant and expanded his business interests into oil production. Grigory was one of the pioneer oil prospectors of the Baku fields and a chief stockholder in the Lena Gold Mining Partnership, as well as a director of the Russian and English Bank Limited of Saint Petersburg.

Berenson was raised with her older sister Flora (1895–1984) and younger sister Manya on the top floor of the home built by Pyotr Mikhailovich Volkonsky in Saint Petersburg and spent time on a country estate known as Redkino. Her father then bought a home on Nevsky Prospect, from which he operated his businesses as well and eventually installed a cinema in 1912. The following year, the business was moved to Sadovaya Street, to the building which now houses the St. Petersburg currency exchange. In 1914, while visiting in Germany, the family decided to relocate to London and moved there permanently in 1915. Grigory began investing in New York City in 1919, buying the City Investing Building. Berenson lived in Paris with her mother in the 1920s, but traveled often to New York. After her mother's death on 27 April 1926, in Nice, Benenson moved permanently to Manhattan, (Note: The Democrat and Chronicle states Benenson moved to the United States in 1921, but this seems unlikely. Per the Ellis Island Foundation, she made 14 trips between 1921 and 1931 from France to New York, and then did not travel again until 1936, as Fira Ilinska, which probably indicates she actually moved to New York in 1931. This is supported by Peggy Guggenheim's account of their friendship. When Guggenheim arrived in Paris (1920) she lived at the Hôtel de Crillon, where Benenson was also living. Guggenheim also states that it was Benenson who helped her find a place to rent for the summer in London, when her first child was born (1923).) where on 19 March 1931, she married Janusz Ilinski, a Polish nobleman and soldier.

== Career ==
His father's investments in real estate in New York allowed Fira to open, with her partner Vera Heller, Verben, an exclusive dress shop between 5th and 6th Avenues on 57th Street. In the mid-1920s, the women's boutique focused on classic but cutting-edge fashion for wealthy women of New York. Fira worked as a buyer and relationship builder with couture houses almost exclusively in Paris.

When the family fortune took a downturn due to the Great Depression and the aftermath of the Wall Street crash of 1929, Benenson opened a dress shop in New York City, gaining a reputation in the fashion industry. In 1934, she was hired by Bonwit Teller to manage their Couture Salon, traveling four times a year to the fashion markets in Paris. In 1940, with travel restrictions due to the war and the German invasion of France, Paris was closed off to the industry. American designers began to create their own designs, and Benenson launched Fira Benenson Inc. Her plan was not to create haute couture fashion, but rather simple, but elegant clothing in which women could walk and sit, while wearing throughout their normal daily routines. While other designers utilized padded shoulders, Benenson preferred natural lines and silhouettes that balanced a woman's figure.

In 1946, the Hoving Corporation made a bid to purchase Bonwit's, which resulted in Benenson's resignation by 1948 to open her own shop. She had become one of the top fashion designers in the United States by 1950, and counted among her clients, Princess Grace of Monaco and Pat Nixon. Increasingly she designed clothes for women over forty, putting out two collections each year for the ready-to-wear market, while still keeping her styles though available in a range of sizes, with the feel of made to order garments. She continued designing through the end of the 1960s.

== Death and legacy ==
Benenson died at her home at 333 East 57th Street in Manhattan on 23 October 1977. She was influential in giving a start to many young designers during her career, including George Halley and Monte Streitfield. Her sister Flora was the mother of Peter Solomon Benenson, founder of Amnesty International and her sister Manya was the noted translator of Doctor Zhivago.
