= Lisa Fritsch =

American community activist(born 1975)

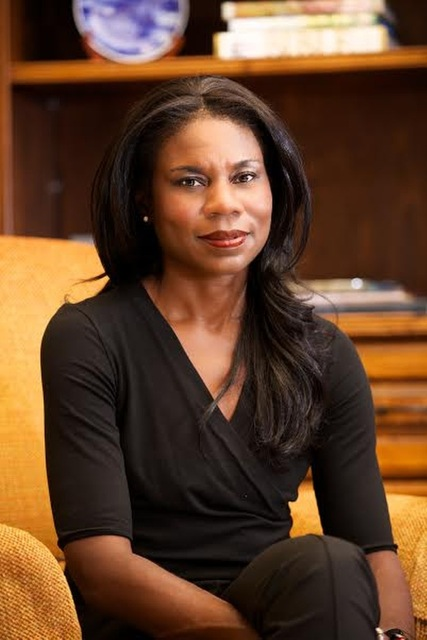
- Born: DeLisa Delley; January 2, 1975 (age 51); Tyler, Texas, U.S.
- Education: University of Texas, Austin; St. Mary's University School of Law
- Occupations: Lawyer, author, public speaker, entrepreneur
- Political party: Independent (2015–present); Republican (before 2015)
- Spouse: Michael Fritsch (m. 2000; div. 2017)
- Children: 2
- Website: www.lisafritsch.com

DeLisa “Lisa” Fritsch (born January 2, 1975) is an American lawyer, author, public speaker, entrepreneur and community activist. She was runner up in the 2014 Republican Primary against Greg Abbott for Governor of Texas. She has written three books on politics and social change, one of which, Obama Tea Parties and God, was a local bestseller.

She was the CEO of LisaServes, LLC. She is an attorney at Dell Technologies.

After losing in the Republican Primary for Governor of Texas, Fritsch changed her political affiliation to independent and directed her work and activism towards representing the underrepresented, building diversity and equity for females and women of color as well as minorities.

She was a 2015 TEDx presenter for TEDxGreatHillsWomen presenting “The Freedom to be The Angry Black Woman.”

== Early life ==
Fritsch was born in Tyler, Texas and raised by her single mother. Her parents divorced when she was five. As an only child and only grandchild on her paternal side, she was surrounded and heavily engaged and influenced by African-American civic and academic leaders in her community. In her youth she studied piano, dance, and was trained and received instruction in etiquette and foreign cultures and martial arts.

Fritsch is a graduate of the University of Texas at Austin with a BA Asian Studies: Japanese Language and Literature.

She also studied Japanese at Obirin University in Tokyo, Japan.

== Career ==
Fritsch began her technology career in Silicon Valley as the only African-American woman at her tech company. Here she developed an admiration for tech and for coaching and developing techies. Her passion for solving inequity began her career in television and media where she was a talk radio show host on KLBJ for ten years.

Fritsch was the founder and president of ACTS Alive (Americans for Christian Conservative Truth), a "think tank that seeks to define the truth about conservative ideas in all forms of media." Fritsch has also lent a dynamic voice as a consultant and strategist for political campaigns and fundraising efforts.

As a writer, Fritsch contributed to Breitbart News and wrote for The Tea Party Review, Freedom’s Journal, GOP USA, American Thinker, Townhall, and The Daily Caller.

== Television and radio ==
Fritsch was a member of the national advisory council for Project 21 and acted as their spokeswoman, garnering national attention for her willingness to stand up to the NAACP when the group accused the Tea Party movement of harboring racist views.

Fritsch has appeared as a commentator locally on Fox7 and nationally on Fox News Channel, MSNBC, and CNN.

Show appearances include The Glenn Beck Program, Your World With Neil Cavuto, The O'Reilly Factor, The Reid Report, and Erin Burnett Outfront.

Fritsch began radio hosting as a fill-in host on 590 KLBJ’s “Morning Show.” She then hosted “Your Sunday Best with Lisa Fritsch” from 2006-2010.

== 2014 gubernatorial race ==
Fritsch announced her decision to run for governor to her friends and supporters at Mighty Fine Burgers Fries & Shakes. After her announcement, she followed it by interviewing in Spanish with a Spanish-language television network. Her tag line during the race was "I'm not your father's conservative," referencing her position as the first black woman to run for governor in Texas. Fritsch received endorsements from groups such as BAMPAC, the Bastrop County Young Republicans, Texans Uniting for Reform and Freedom (TURF), BlakPAC, and the Central Texas Coalition for Life. Fritsch called on one million citizens to contribute one dollar to her campaign so she could get her message out. Fritsch often warned the Texas GOP that the state could turn Democratic if they refused to reach out to changing demographics. Fritsch also noted that she was financially the most charitable candidate in the race. She was one of three candidates running against Greg Abbott, the party favorite, and she was described as the most serious of Abbott's rivals. Fritsch finished second in a four-way primary race, behind Abbott, with 4.4% of the vote.

== Political views ==
During her candidacy for governor in 2014, Fritsch laid out nine branches of what her vision for Texas would look like under her leadership:

- Education Reform: Prepare the Child, Not the Path
- Life is a Terrible Thing to Waste
- A New Day In The Republican Party
- Immigration Reform Policy
- The Second Amendment
- Dignity for our Veterans
- Texans with Disabilities
- Transparency
- States Rights

Fritsch later changed political affiliations from Republican to Independent following her run for governor. She writes about this in her book Politically Corrected.

Fritsch provided an analysis of the 2016 Republican Presidential candidates and provided five tips of advice to the GOP in November 2015.

Recognizing herself as an "unlikely defender", Fritsch went through in expressing her support for Donald Trump's candidacy for president during the 2016 Republican Presidential Primary on April 28, 2016, stating that she was once a "state level" version of him in the sense that they were both 'outsiders.'

== Personal life ==
Fritsch is a 7th generation Texan born and raised in East Texas. She was raised by her single divorced mother and an extended family. Fritsch went on to study at the University of Texas at Austin where she majored in Asian studies and studied abroad in Japan.

Her single mother, Debra played a huge role in her political beliefs. Fritsch often recalled a moment between the two of them when she ran for governor in 2014. "She looked me in the eye and said, ‘I would rather us both starve than for me to put you on a path where you didn’t have dignity and you would feel like a victim,’” Fritsch said. “At that moment, I was transformed.”

While at the University of Texas, she attended a meeting for Republican students and felt that their political views mirrored those of her mother, beginning her interest in politics and activism.

In 2000, Fritsch (then Delley) married Michael Fritsch. They have two children and divorced in 2017.
