= Albert Gendelshtein =

Albert Gendelshtein (Ukrainian: Гендельштейн Альберт Олександрович; 4 April 1906, Kyiv, Ukraine — 25 March 1981, Moscow, Russia) was a Soviet film director known for the movies Lermontov, and Love and Hate (1935) with an early score by Shostakovich.
