= Ilya Ehrenburg =

Soviet writer (1891–1967)

- Илья Эренбург
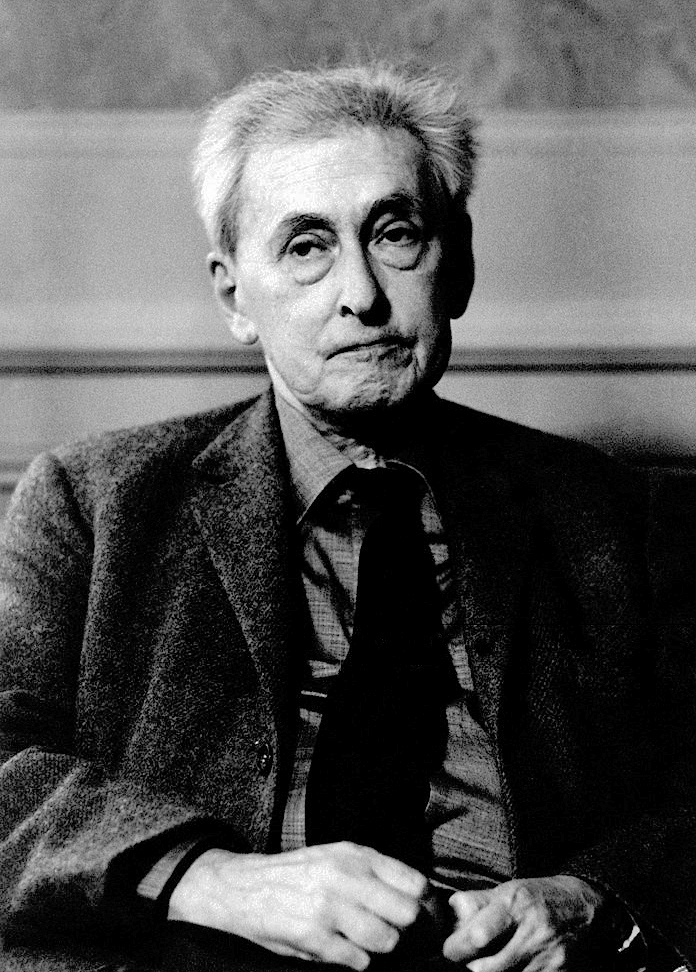
- Ehrenburg in the 1960s
- Born: 26 January 1891; Kiev, Russian Empire
- Died: 31 August 1967 (aged 76); Moscow, Russian SFSR, Soviet Union
- Writing career
- Notable works: Julio Jurenito, The Thaw

Ilya Grigoryevich Ehrenburg (Russian: Илья Григорьевич Эренбург, pronounced [ɪˈlʲja ɡrʲɪˈɡorʲjɪvɪtɕ ɪrʲɪnˈburk]; 26 January [O.S. 14 January] 1891 – 31 August 1967) was a Soviet writer, poet, revolutionary, journalist, translator, and cultural figure.

Ehrenburg was among the most prolific and notable authors of the Soviet Union; he published around one hundred titles. He became known first and foremost as a novelist and a journalist – in particular, as a reporter in three wars (First World War, Spanish Civil War and the Second World War). His incendiary articles calling for violence against Germans during the Great Patriotic War won him a huge following among frontline Soviet soldiers, but also caused much controversy due to their perceived anti-German sentiment. Ehrenburg later clarified that his writings were about "German aggressors who set foot on Soviet soil with weapons", not the whole German people.

The novel The Thaw gave its name to an entire era of Soviet politics, namely, the liberalization which occurred after the death of Joseph Stalin. Ehrenburg's travel writing also had great resonance, and to an arguably greater extent, so did his memoir People, Years, Life, which may be his best known and most discussed work. The Black Book, edited by him and Vasily Grossman, has special historical significance; it describes the Holocaust in the Soviet Union, the genocide which was committed against Soviet citizens of Jewish ancestry by the Nazis; it was denounced as "anti-Soviet" and banned from publication. It was first published in Jerusalem in 1980.

In addition, Ehrenburg wrote a succession of works of poetry.

== Life and work ==
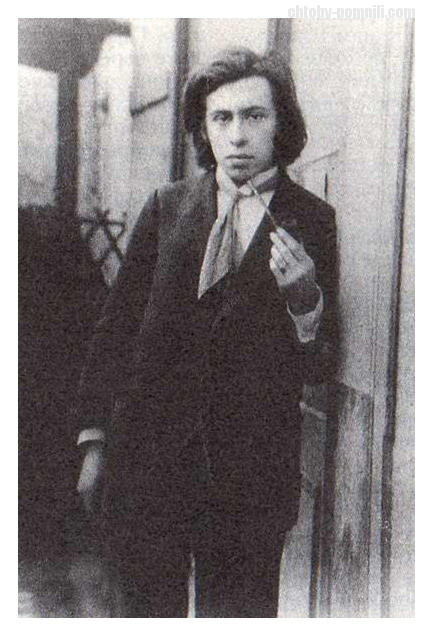
Ehrenburg, early 20th century

Ilya Ehrenburg was born in Kiev in the Russian Empire (present-day Ukraine) to a Lithuanian–Jewish family; his father was an engineer. Ehrenburg's household was not religiously observant; he came into contact with the religious practices of Judaism only through his maternal grandfather. Ehrenburg never practiced Judaism. He learned no Yiddish, although he edited the Black Book, which was written in Yiddish. He considered himself a Russian and, later, a Soviet citizen, and wrote in Russian even during his many years abroad. Ehrenburg also took strong public positions against antisemitism, and left all his papers to Israel's Yad Vashem.

When Ehrenburg was four years old, the family moved to Moscow, where his father had been hired as director of a brewery. At school, he met Nikolai Bukharin, who was two grades above him. The two remained friends until Bukharin's execution in 1938 during the Great Purge.

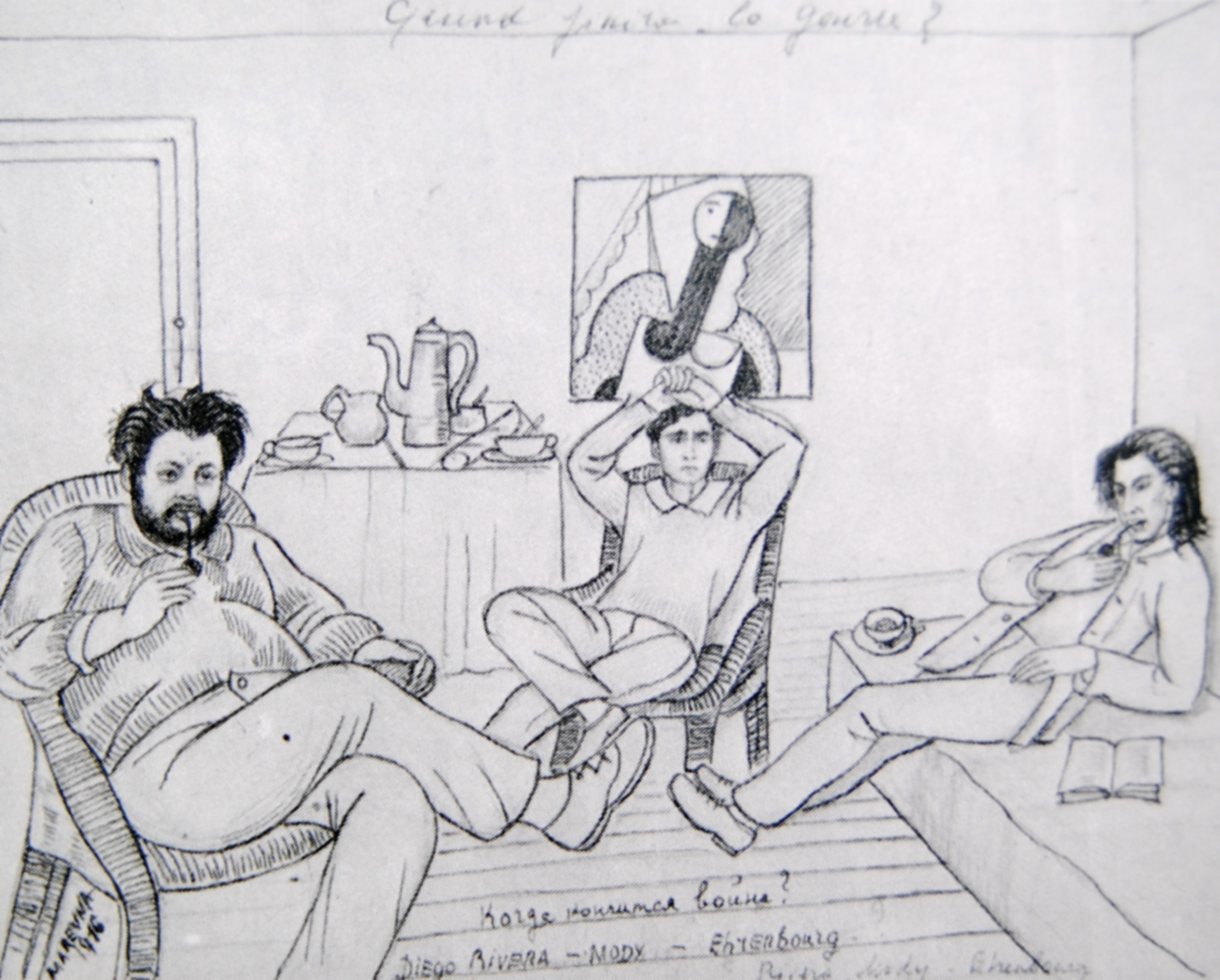
Sketch by Marie Vorobieff featuring Diego Rivera, Amedeo Modigliani and Ehrenburg at Rivera's atelier, 1916. It is titled "When will the war end?"

In the aftermath of the Russian Revolution of 1905, both Ehrenburg and Bukharin got involved in illegal activities of the Bolshevik organisation. In 1908, when Ehrenburg was seventeen years old, the tsarist secret police (Okhrana) arrested him for five months. He was beaten up and lost some teeth. Finally he was allowed to go abroad and chose Paris for his exile.

In Paris, he started to work in the Bolshevik organisation, meeting Vladimir Lenin and other prominent exiles. But soon he left these circles and the party. Ehrenburg became attached to the bohemian life in the Paris quarter of Montparnasse. He began to write poems, regularly visited the cafés of Montparnasse and became acquainted with a lot of artists, especially Pablo Picasso, Diego Rivera, Jules Pascin, and Amedeo Modigliani. Foreign writers whose works Ehrenburg translated included those of Francis Jammes.

During World War I, Ehrenburg became a war correspondent for a St. Petersburg newspaper. He wrote a series of articles about the mechanized war that were later also published as a book (The Face of War). His poetry now also concentrated on subjects of war and destruction, as in On the Eve, his third lyrical book. Nikolai Gumilev, a famous symbolistic poet, wrote favourably about Ehrenburg's progress in poetry.

In 1917, after the revolution, Ehrenburg returned to Russia. At that time he tended to oppose the Bolshevik policy, being shocked by the constant atmosphere of violence. He wrote a poem called "Prayer for Russia" which compared the storming of the Winter Palace to rape. In 1920 Ehrenburg went to Kiev where he experienced four different regimes in the course of one year: the Germans, the Cossacks, the Bolsheviks, and the White Army. After antisemitic pogroms, he fled to Koktebel on the Crimea peninsula where his old friend from Paris days, Maximilian Voloshin, had a house. Finally, Ehrenburg returned to Moscow, where he soon was arrested by the Cheka but freed after a short time.

He became a Soviet cultural activist and journalist who spent much time abroad as a writer. He wrote avant-garde picaresque novels and short stories popular in the 1920s, often set in Western Europe (The Extraordinary Adventures of Julio Jurenito and his Disciples (1922), Thirteen Pipes). Ehrenburg continued to write philosophical poetry, using more freed rhythms than in the 1910s. In 1929 he published The Life of the Automobile, a communist variant of the it-narrative genre.

In 1935, Ehrenburg attended the first International Congress of Writers for the Defense of Culture, which opened in Paris in June. He had written a pamphlet which said, among other things, that surrealists shunned work, favouring parasitism, and that they endorsed "onanism, pederasty, fetishism, exhibitionism, and even sodomy". André Breton — along with all fellow surrealists — felt insulted and accosted Ehrenburg on the street and slapped him several times, which resulted in surrealists being expelled from the Congress.

=== Poetry ===
Ehrenburg's first published poem, "I walked toward you" (Ya shyol k tebe), appeared in the journal Severnye zori on 8 January 1910. His debut collection, Stikhi ("Poems"), followed later that year. Over the next decade, he published several further collections: Ya zhivu ("I Live," 1911), Oduvanchiki ("Dandelions," 1912), Budni ("Weekdays," 1913), and Stikhi o kanunakh ("Poems on the Eve," 1916). In 1916, he also published Russian translations of François Villon. His philosophical poetry of the 1920s, including the collection Opustoshayushchaya lyubov ("Devastating Love," 1922), used freer rhythms than his earlier verse. During World War II, he returned to lyric poetry with Vernost ("Fidelity," 1941). Ehrenburg continued to write poetry until his last years, though he became far better known for his prose and journalism.

=== Spanish Civil War ===
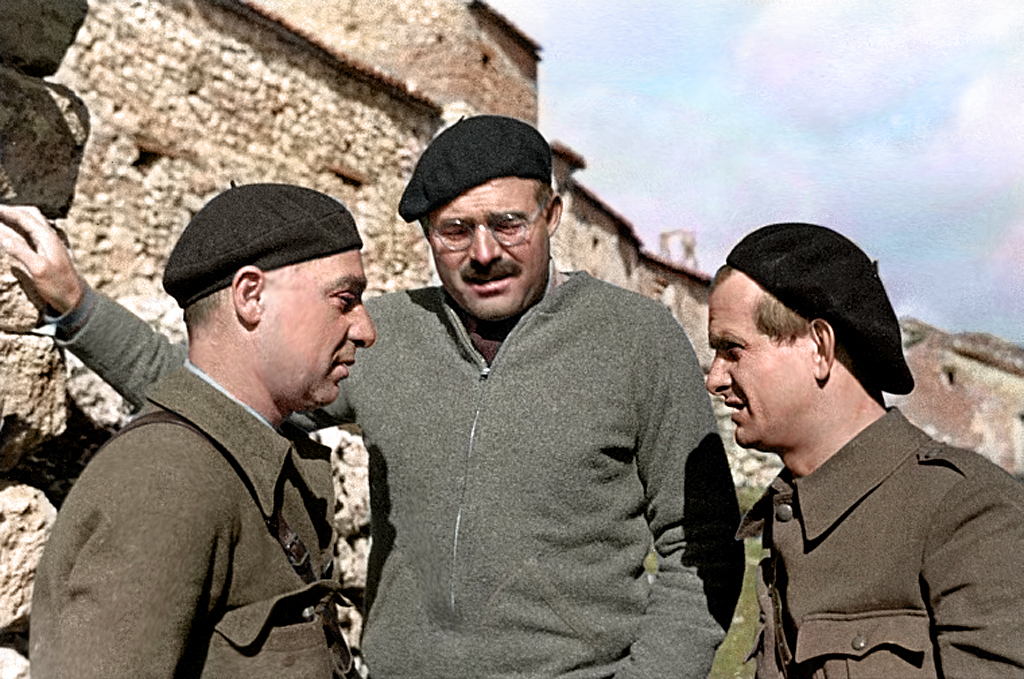
Ehrenburg (left) with Ernest Hemingway and Gustav Regler in Spain, 1937

As a friend of many of the European Left, Ehrenburg was frequently allowed by Stalin to visit Europe and to campaign for peace and socialism. He arrived in Spain in late August 1936 as an Izvestia correspondent and was involved in propaganda and military activity as well as reporting. In July 1937 he attended the Second International Writers' Congress, the purpose of which was to discuss the attitude of intellectuals to the war, held in Valencia, Barcelona, and Madrid and attended by many writers including André Malraux, Ernest Hemingway, Stephen Spender, and Pablo Neruda.

=== World War II ===
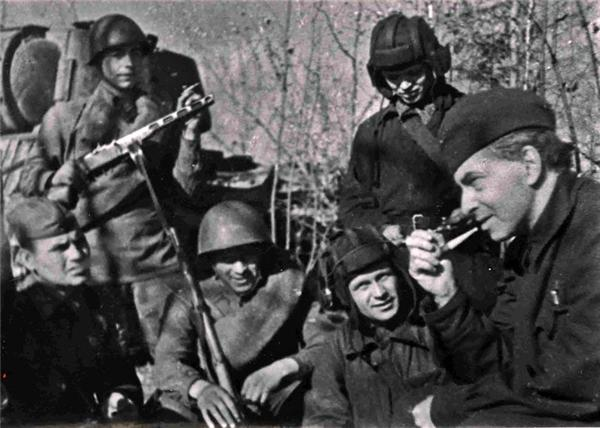
Ilya Ehrenburg with Red Army soldiers in 1942

Ehrenburg was offered a column in Krasnaya Zvezda (the Red Army newspaper) days after the German invasion of the Soviet Union. During the war, he published more than 2,000 articles in Soviet newspapers. He saw the Great Patriotic War as a dramatic contest between good and evil. In his articles, moral and life-affirming Red Army soldiers faced off against a dehumanized German enemy. In 1943, Ehrenburg, working with the Jewish Anti-Fascist Committee, began to collect material for what would become The Black Book of Soviet Jewry, documenting The Holocaust. In a December 1944 article in Pravda, Ehrenburg declared that the Germans' greatest crime was the murder of six million Jews.

His incendiary articles calling for vengeance against the German enemy won him a huge following among front-line Soviet soldiers, who sent him much fan mail. As a consequence, he is one of many Soviet writers, along with Konstantin Simonov and Alexey Surkov, whom many have accused of "[lending] their literary talents to the hate campaign" against Germans. Austrian historian Arnold Suppan argued that Ehrenburg "agitated in the style of Nazi racist ideology", with statements such as:

The Germans are not humans. […] From now on, the word German causes gunfire. We shall not speak. We shall kill. If during a day you have not killed a single German, you have wasted the day. […] If you do not kill the German, he will kill you. […] If it is quiet at your section of the front and you are waiting for the battle, kill a German before the battle. If you let the German live, he will kill a Russian man and rape a Russian woman. If you have killed a German, kill another one too. […] Kill the German, thus cries your homeland.

Ehrenburg in Tallinn, 1946

This pamphlet, titled "Kill", was written during the Battle of Stalingrad. Ehrenburg later accompanied the Soviet forces during the East Prussian Offensive and criticized the indiscriminate violence against German civilians, for which he was reprimanded by Stalin. However, his previous writings had already been interpreted as license for atrocities against German civilians during the Soviet invasion of Germany in 1945. Nazi propaganda minister Joseph Goebbels accused Ehrenburg of advocating the rape of German women. However, Ehrenburg denied this and historian Antony Beevor claims that it was a Nazi fabrication. In January 1945, Adolf Hitler stated that "Stalin's court lackey, Ilya Ehrenburg, declares that the German people must be exterminated". After criticism by Georgy Aleksandrov in Pravda in April 1945, Ehrenburg responded that he never meant wiping out the German people, but only German aggressors who set foot on Soviet soil with weapons, because "we are not Nazis who fight with civilians”. Ehrenburg fell into disgrace at that time and it is estimated that Aleksandrov's article was a signal of change in Stalin's policy towards Germany.

=== The 'Anti-Cosmopolitan' Campaign ===
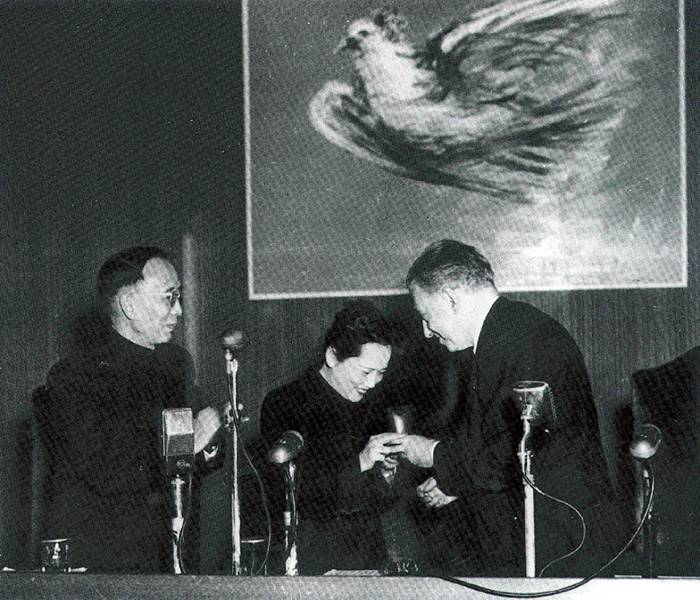
Ehrenburg awarding the Stalin Peace Prize to Soong Ching-ling and Guo Moruo, April 1951

On 21 September 1948, at the behest of Politburo members Lazar Kaganovich and Georgy Malenkov, Ehrenburg published an article in Pravda which signified Stalin's absolute political break with Israel, which he had been supporting through enormous shipments of Czech arms. After this break with Israel, hundreds of Jews became targets of the so-called anti-cosmopolitan campaign. The chairman of the Jewish Anti-Fascist Committee, Solomon Mikhoels, was murdered, and many Soviet Jewish intellectuals were imprisoned or executed.

Ilya Ehrenburg's name was high on a list presented to Stalin by the chief of police, Viktor Abakumov, of people selected for arrest. He was accused of having "made attacks on Comrade Stalin" when talking to the French writer André Malraux in Spain in 1937. While Stalin agreed to the arrests of most of the names on the list, he put a question mark by Ehrenburg's. It appears that Ehrenburg was allowed to continue publishing and travelling abroad to obscure the anti-Semitic campaign at home. During a press conference in London in 1950, attended by over 200 journalists, he was challenged about the fate of the writers David Bergelson and Itzik Feffer, and said that "If anything unpleasant had happened to them, I would have known", knowing that they were both under arrest. He was accused of informing on his comrades, but there is no evidence to support this theory. In February 1953, he refused to denounce the supposed doctors' plot and wrote a letter to Stalin opposing collective punishment of Jews.

=== Postwar writings ===
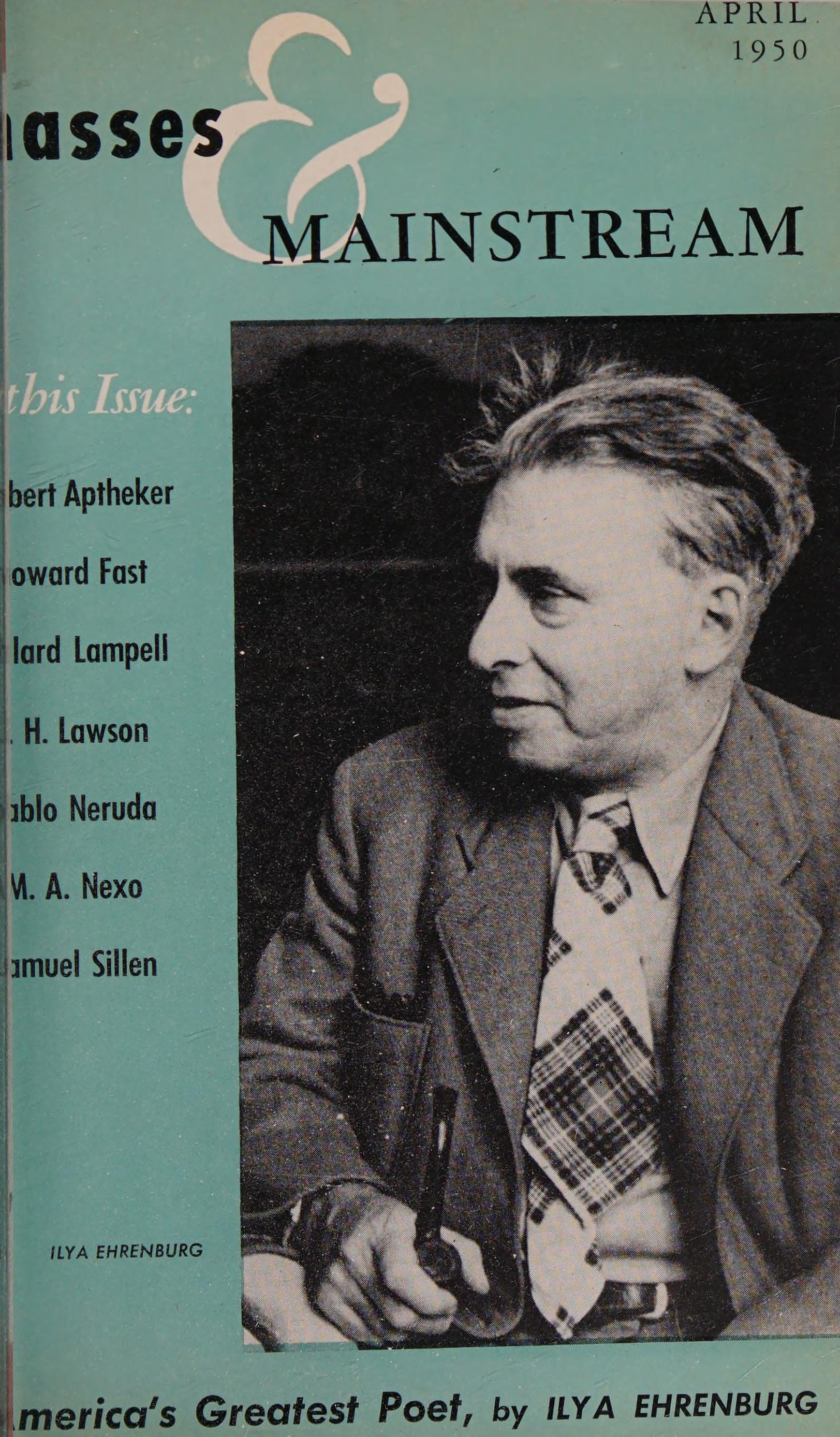
Ehrenburg on the cover of Masses & Mainstream, April 1950

Ehrenburg received the Stalin Peace Prize in 1948.

In 1954, Ehrenburg published a novel titled The Thaw that tested the limits of censorship in the post-Stalin Soviet Union. It portrayed a corrupt and despotic factory boss, a "little Stalin", and told the story of his wife, who increasingly feels estranged from him, and the views he represents. In the novel, the spring thaw comes to represent a period of change in the characters' emotional journeys, and when the wife eventually leaves her husband, this coincides with the melting of the snow. Thus, the novel can be seen as a representation of the thaw, and the increased freedom of the writer after the 'frozen' political period under Stalin. In August 1954, Konstantin Simonov attacked The Thaw in articles published in Literaturnaya Gazeta, arguing that such writings are too dark and do not serve the Soviet state. The novel gave its name to the Khrushchev Thaw.

Ehrenburg is particularly well known for his memoirs (People, Years, Life in Russian, published with the title Memoirs: 1921–1941 in English), which contain many portraits of interest to literary historians and biographers. In this book, Ehrenburg was the first legal Soviet author to mention positively a lot of names banned under Stalin, including Marina Tsvetaeva. At the same time he disapproved of the Russian and Soviet intellectuals who had explicitly rejected communism or defected to the West. He also criticized writers like Boris Pasternak, author of Doctor Zhivago, for not having been able to understand the course of history.

Ehrenburg's memoirs were criticized by the more conservative faction among the Soviet writers, concentrated around the journal Oktyabr. For example, when the memoirs were published, Vsevolod Kochetov reflected on certain writers who were "burrowing in the rubbish heaps of their crackpot memories". In January 1963, the critic Vladimir Yermilov wrote a long article in Izvestia in which he picked up on Ehrenburg's admission that he had suspected that innocent people were being arrested in 1937 and 1938 but had "gritted his teeth" in silence.

Yermilov alleged that this proved that Ehrenburg had been in a privileged position in those years but said nothing, when others, less privileged, had spoken out when they believed an innocent person had been arrested. Ehrenburg retorted that he had never been to a single meeting nor read a single article in which anyone had protested about the arrests, whereupon Yermilov accused him of having insulted a "whole generation of Soviet people".

For the contemporary reader though, the work appears to have a distinctly Marxist-Leninist ideological flavor characteristic of a Soviet-era official writer.

He was also active in publishing the works by Osip Mandelstam when the latter had been posthumously rehabilitated but still largely unacceptable for censorship. Ehrenburg was also active as a poet till his last days, depicting the events of World War II in Europe, the Holocaust and the destinies of Russian intellectuals.

=== First Pablo Picasso Exhibition in the USSR in 1956 ===
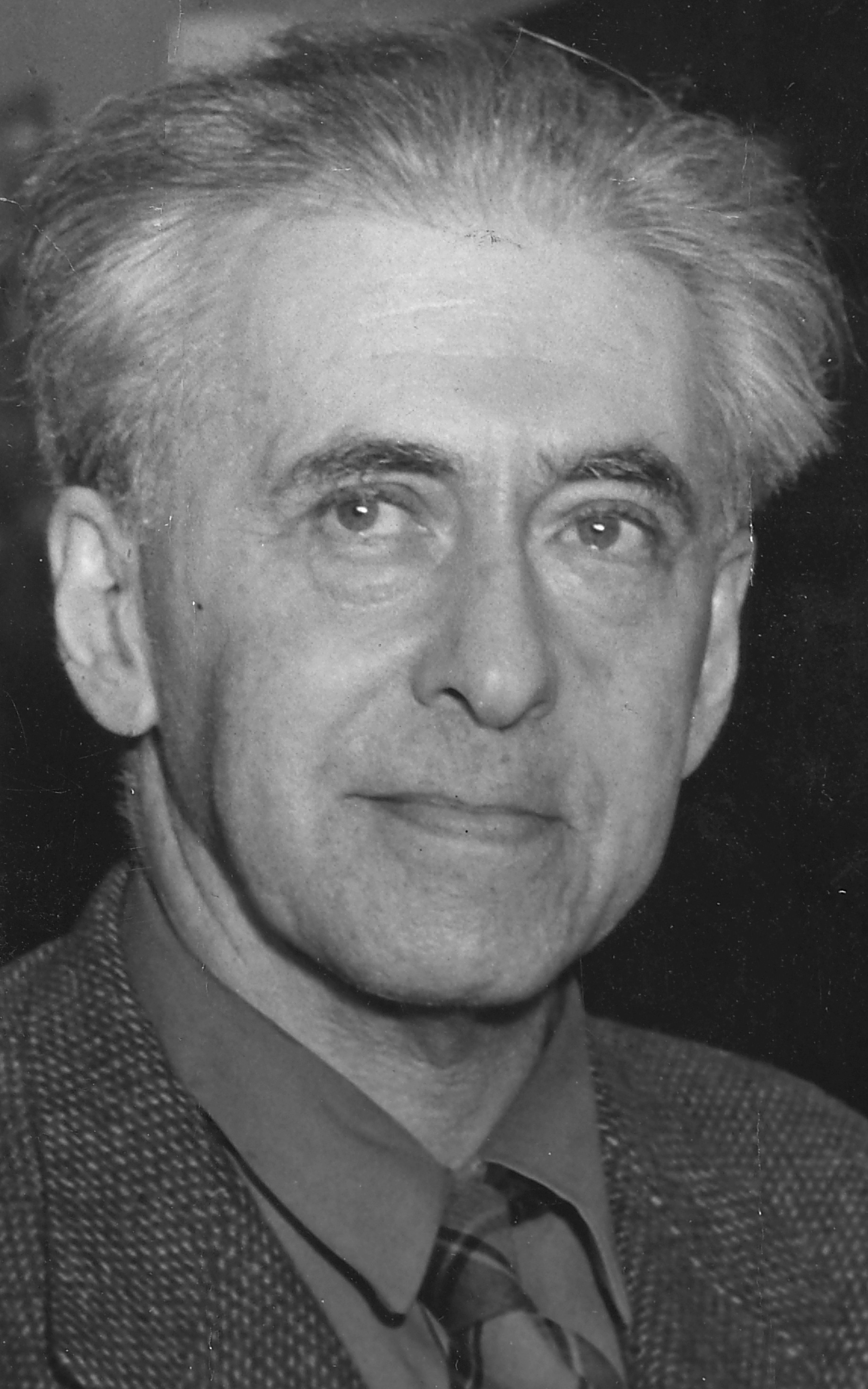
Ehrenburg in 1959

As Pablo Picasso’s close acquaintance since 1914, Ehrenburg played a pivotal role in organizing Picasso’s first ever exhibition in the USSR which opened on 21 October 1956 in Pushkin Museum and three weeks later was transferred to the Hermitage Museum in Saint Petersburg. Picasso’s first exhibition, which meaningfully coincided with the Hungarian Revolution and the Georgian Demonstrations, became a conduit for discussions of creative freedom and expression endemic to the Khrushchev Thaw period. The exhibition emboldened young Soviet non-conformist artists in their search for art beyond Socialist Realism.

In 1960, four years after the 1956 exhibition, Ehrenburg helped to push through the Soviet censorship the first ever book on Picasso to be printed in the USSR, written by Andrey Sinyavsky and Igor Golomshtok. The book “Pablo Picasso” contained a huge article written by Ehrenburg with his memories about meeting Picasso in Paris since 1914 and at the First International Peace Congress held in Paris in 1949, and Ehrenburg’s memories about the 1956 exhibition. The book “Pablo Picasso” contained more than 40 illustrations of Picasso’s main canvases to be first printed in the USSR and made a lasting impression on the Soviet general public and professional artists.

=== Death and legacy ===
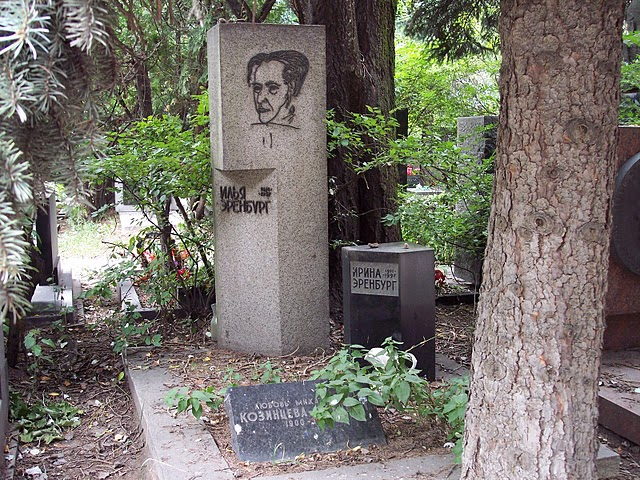
Ilya Ehrenburg's grave with a wire reproduction of his portrait by Picasso

Ehrenburg died in 1967 of prostate and bladder cancer, and was interred in Novodevichy Cemetery in Moscow, where his gravestone is etched with a reproduction of his portrait drawn by his friend Pablo Picasso.

In 1968, Polish-American writer and journalist S.L. Shneiderman published a Yiddish biography of Ehrenburg, whom he had met in interwar Paris and in Spain. In his biography, Shneiderman defended Ehrenburg from accusations of collaboration with Stalin in the destruction of Soviet Yiddish culture.

== English translations ==
- The Love of Jeanne Ney, Doubleday, Doran and Company 1930.
- The Extraordinary Adventures of Julio Jurenito and his Disciples, Covici Friede, NY, 1930.
- A Soviet Writer Looks at Vienna, Lawrence, London, 1934.
- The Fall of Paris, Knopf, NY, 1943. [novel]
- Russia At War, Hamish Hamilton, London, 1943
- The Tempering of Russia, Knopf, NY, 1944.
- European Crossroad: A Soviet Journalist In the Balkans, Knopf, NY, 1947.
- The Storm, Foreign Languages Publishing House, Moscow, 1948.
- The Thaw, Henry Regnery Company, Chicago, 1955.
- The Ninth Wave, Lawrence and Wishart, London, 1955.
- The Stormy Life of Lasik Roitschwantz, Polyglot Library, 1960.
- A Change of Season, (includes The Thaw and its sequel The Spring), Knopf, NY, 1962.
- Chekhov, Stendhal and Other Essays, Knopf, NY, 1963.
- Memoirs: 1921–1941, World Pub. Co., Cleveland, 1963.
- Life of the Automobile, URIZEN BOOKS Joachim Neugroeschel translator 1976.
- The Second Day, Raduga Publishers, Moscow, 1984.
- The Fall of Paris, Simon Publications, 2002.
- My Paris, Editions 7, Paris, 2005

"The D.E.Trust", M-Graphics, Boston, 2025

== See also ==
- Outline of the Russian Revolution and Civil War
- Bibliography of the Russian Revolution and Civil War
- Bibliography of Stalinism and the Soviet Union
- Index of Old Bolsheviks
- Index of articles related to the Russian Revolution and Civil War

== Sources ==
- Clark, Katerina (2011). Moscow, the Fourth Rome. Cambridge: Harvard University Press. ISBN 978-0-674-06289-4.
- Gilburd, Eleonory (2018). To See Paris and Die: The Soviet Lives of Western Culture. Cambridge: Harvard University Press. ISBN 978-0-674-98071-6.
- Goldberg, Anatol (1984). Ilya Ehrenburg: Writing, Politics and the Art of Survival. Weidenfeld and Nicolson.
- Laychuk, Julian L. (1991). Ilya Ehrenburg. New York: Herbert Lang. ISBN 978-3-261-04292-7.
- Sicher, Efraim (1995). Jews in Russian Literature After the October Revolution: Writers and Artists Between Hope and Apostasy. Cambridge: Cambridge University Press. ISBN 9780521481090.
- Shneiderman, S.L. Ilye Erenburg [Eng: Ilya Ehrenburg]. New York: Yidisher Kempfer, 1968.
- Rubenstein, Joshua (1999). Tangled Loyalties: The Life and Times of Ilya Ehrenburg. Tuscaloosa: University of Alabama Press. ISBN 978-0-8173-0963-3.
