= Peter Benenson =

British lawyer and human rights activist (1921–2005)

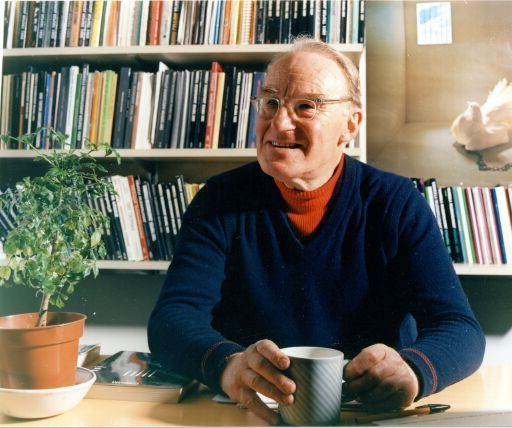
- Born: Peter James Henry Solomon; 31 July 1921; London, England
- Died: 25 February 2005 (aged 83); Oxford, England
- Resting place: Nuneham Courtenay graveyard
- Education: Balliol College, Oxford
- Known for: Founding the global human rights organisation Amnesty International
- Spouse(s): Margaret Anderson (?–1972; divorced; 2 children); Susan Booth (1973–2005; his death; 2 children)
- Parent(s): Flora Benenson; Harold Solomon

Peter Benenson (born Peter James Henry Solomon; 31 July 1921 – 25 February 2005) was a British barrister, human rights activist and the founder of the human rights group Amnesty International (AI); a global movement that claims to have more than 10 million members in over 150 countries and territories, who campaign to end abuses on human rights and to secure the release of political prisoners.

He refused all honours for most of his life, but in his 80s, largely to please his family, he accepted the Pride of Britain Award for Lifetime Achievement in 2001. In the 1980s, he became the chairman of Association of Christians Against Torture. Also, in the 1990s Peter Benenson organized aid for Romanian orphans. He also founded a group to aid victims of celiac disease which he had.

== Early life ==
Benenson was born in London to a large Jewish family, the only son of British-born Harold Solomon and Russian-born Flora Benenson; Peter Benenson adopted his mother's maiden name later in life. His father, an army officer, died from a long-term injury when Benenson was nine, and he was privately tutored by W. H. Auden before attending Eton College. At the age of sixteen, he helped to establish a relief fund with other schoolboys for children orphaned by the Spanish Civil War. He took his mother's maiden name of Benenson acceding to his dying grandfather’s wishes, the Russian financier Grigori Benenson (1860–1939).

He enrolled for study at Balliol College, Oxford, but World War II interrupted his education. He served in the Intelligence Corps at the Ministry of Information, where he met his first wife, Margaret Anderson. He worked at Bletchley Park during World War II in the Testery. He is listed as RSM Benenson in Room 41 as a cryptographer.

== Career ==
After demobilisation in 1946, Benenson began practising as a barrister before joining the Labour Party and standing unsuccessfully for election at Streatham in 1950 and for Hitchin in 1951, 1955, and 1959. He was one of a group of British lawyers who, in 1957, founded JUSTICE, the UK-based human rights and law reform organisation. In 1958, he fell ill and moved to Italy to convalesce. In the same year, he converted to the Roman Catholic Church.

Benenson was a member of the Fabian Society and wrote "The Future of Legal Aid" which was published by them in 1957.

=== Activism ===
Benenson had said he was shocked and angered by a newspaper report of two Portuguese people sentenced to prison for subversion during the regime of António de Oliveira Salazar. At the time, Portugal was ruled by the authoritarian Estado Novo regime, and anti-regime conspiracies were vigorously repressed by the Portuguese state police and deemed anti-Portuguese. He wrote to David Astor, editor of The Observer. On 28 May 1961, Benenson's article, entitled "The Forgotten Prisoners", was published. The letter asked readers to write letters showing support for all those imprisoned for their political or religious beliefs. To co-ordinate such letter-writing campaigns, Amnesty International was founded in London in July 1961 at a meeting of Benenson and six other men, who included a Conservative, a Liberal and a Labour MP. The response was so overwhelming that within a year various groups of letter-writers had formed in more than a dozen countries.

== Amnesty International ==
Initially appointed general secretary of AI, Benenson stood down in 1964 owing to ill health. By 1966, Amnesty International faced an internal crisis. The advisory position of president of the International Executive was then created for him. In 1966, after a controversial report alleging torture during the Aden Emergency went ultimately unpublished, he began to make allegations that the British government had infiltrated the governance of AI. An inquiry was set up which reported at Elsinore in Denmark in 1967. The allegations were rejected and Benenson resigned from AI.

While never again active in the organisation, Benenson was later personally reconciled with other executives, including Seán MacBride.

== Personal life ==
Benenson's marriage to his first wife Margaret Anderson ended in a divorce in 1972; he had two children to her, Natasha Benenson and Jilly Benenson. He married Susan Booth in 1973 and had two children, Manya Benenson and Joachim Benenson.

== Death ==
Benenson died of pneumonia on 25 February 2005 at the John Radcliffe Hospital, Oxford, aged 83, having been a resident of the nearby village of Nuneham Courtenay where he was buried.

== Sources ==
- Pincock, S.: Peter James Henry Solomon Benenson (obituary). Lancet, 2 April 2005; 365: 1224.

Non-profit organization positions
Preceded by None	President of Amnesty International; 1961–1966	Succeeded by Eric Baker
