= Porto Alegre Manifesto =

2005 World Social Forum proposal

The Porto Alegre Manifesto is a proposal for social change produced at the 2005 World Social Forum. It outlines "twelve... proposals, which [its authors] believe, together, give sense and direction to the construction of another, different world." The authors argue that "if they would be implemented, it would allow citizens to take back their own future. We therefore want to submit these fundamentals points to the scrutiny of actors and social movements of all countries." These proposals are divided into Economic Measures, Peace and Justice, and Democracy.

== Summary of twelve proposals ==
=== Economic measures ===
1. Debt cancellation for southern countries.

2. Implement international tax on financial transactions, i.e., Tobin tax.

3. Dismantle all tax havens and corporate havens (described as "paradises").

4. Universal right to employment, social protection and pensions.

5. Promote fair trade and reject all free trade agreements and World Trade Organization laws, emphasizing the importance of education, health, social services and cultural rights over commercial rights.

6. Guarantee of food security to all countries by promoting rural, peasant agriculture.

7. Outlaw patenting of knowledge on living things and privatization of "common goods for humanity", i.e., water.

=== Peace and justice ===
8. Use public policies to fight discrimination, sexism, xenophobia, antisemitism and racism and fully recognize the political, cultural and economic rights of indigenous peoples.

9. Take steps to end environmental destruction and the greenhouse effect using alternative development models.

10. Dismantle all foreign military bases and the removal of troops from all countries except those under the explicit mandate of the United Nations.

=== Democracy ===
11. Guarantee the right to information and the right to inform through legislation that would end concentration of media ownership, guarantee the autonomy of journalists, and favor alternative media.

12. Reform international institutions based on the Universal Declaration of Human Rights and incorporate the World Bank, International Monetary Fund and WTO into the United Nations.

== Signatories ==
The signatures of the manifesto (so-called "Group of Nineteen") are Aminata Traoré, Adolfo Pérez Esquivel, Eduardo Galeano, José Saramago, François Houtart, Boaventura de Sousa Santos, Armand Mattelart, Roberto Savio, Riccardo Petrella, Ignacio Ramonet, Bernard Cassen, Samir Amin, Atilio Borón, Samuel Ruiz García, Tariq Ali, Frei Betto, Emir Sader, Walden Bello, and Immanuel Wallerstein.
