= Asian Social Forum =

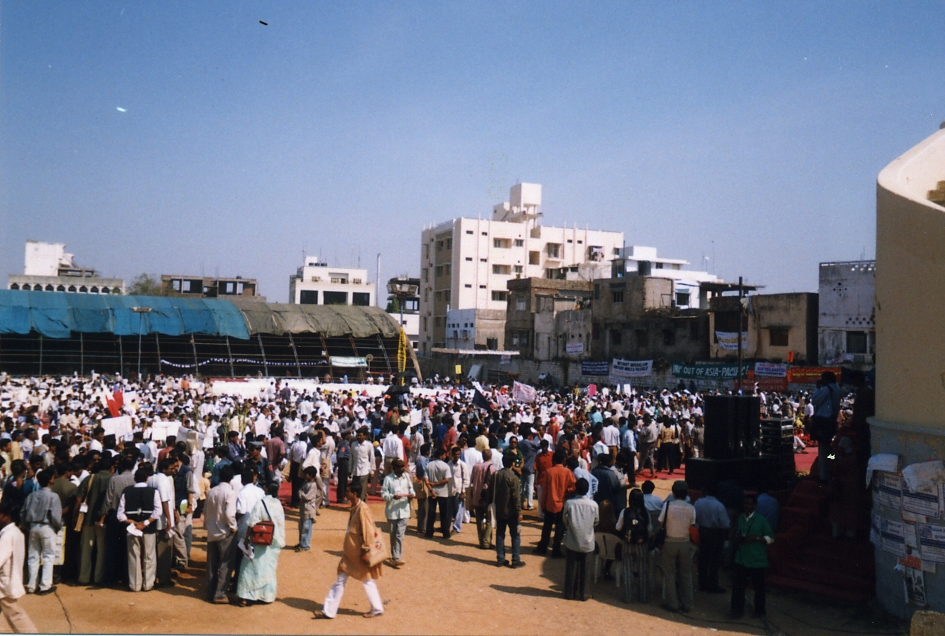
ASF main venue

The Asian Social Forum was a left-wing conference held by members of the alter-globalization movement (also known as the Global Justice Movement). It aims to allow social movements, trade unions, NGOs, refugees, peace and anti-imperialist groups, anti-racist movements, environmental movements, networks of the excluded and community campaigns mainly from the Asian region to come together and discuss themes linked to major Asian and global political issues. It emerged from the World Social Forum.

The conference was held between 2–7 January 2003 in Hyderabad, Andhra Pradesh, India. It was held at 90 or more venues. And was attended by 8,000 delegates.

From 2006, the World Social Forum is "polycentric," occurring in various parts of the world, continuing the same concept but without the title "Asian Social Forum." The Karachi Social Forum was held between 24 and 29 March 2006.

== Issues ==
The different groups involved have so far identified the following issues

- Dalit rights
- Water rights
- Housing rights
- Communalism
- free software
- Freedom of information
- 2002 Gujarat violence
- Women's rights
