= World Trade Organization Ministerial Conference of 2015 =

WTO trade conference in Nairobi, Kenya

Tenth Ministerial Conference of the World Trade Organization

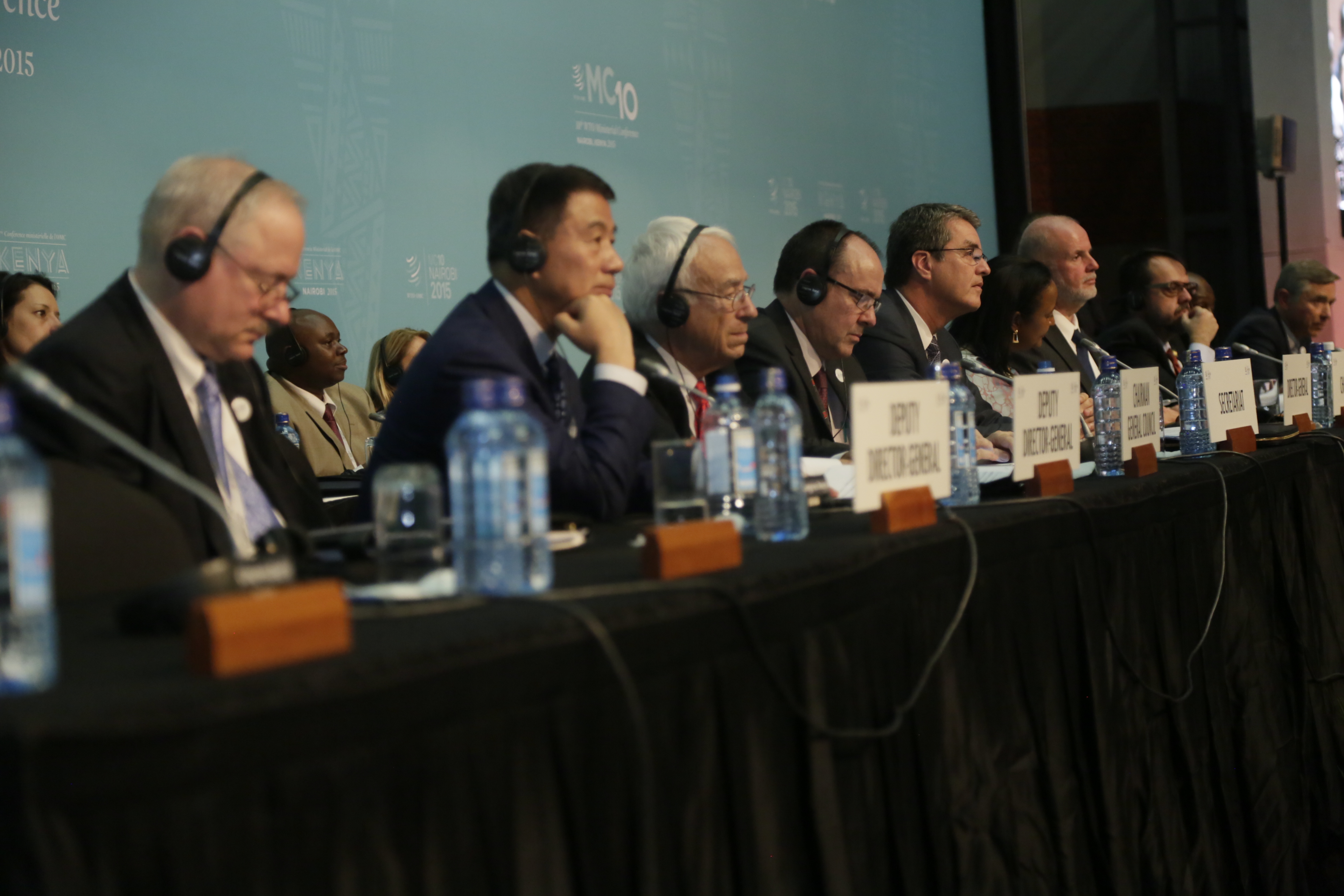
- Country: Nairobi, Kenya
- Previous event: Ninth Ministerial Conference of the World Trade Organization
- Next event: Eleventh Ministerial Conference of the World Trade Organization
- Participants: World Trade Organization member countries
- Major events: Accession of Afghanistan and Liberia; Adoption of Nairobi Package addressing Agriculture, Cotton and LDC's

The Tenth World Trade Organization Ministerial Conference was held in Nairobi, Kenya from 15 to 19 December 2015. The conference was chaired by the Kenyan Foreign Affairs Minister Amina Mohamed.

The conference agreed an extension to the 1996 Information Technology Agreement. Afghanistan and Liberia acceded to the WTO, bringing the total membership of the organization to 164, with the total number of least-developed countries who have joined since 1995 rising to nine.

The legislative package focuses on agricultural issues and Least Developed Countries (LDCs), specifically through the elimination of export subsidies by developed nations and the extension of strategic food stockpiles. Key provisions include the removal of customs duties on cotton produced by LDCs and a special safeguard mechanism allowing developing countries to raise agricultural tariffs under specific conditions.
