= Atilio Borón =

Argentine sociologist (born 1943)

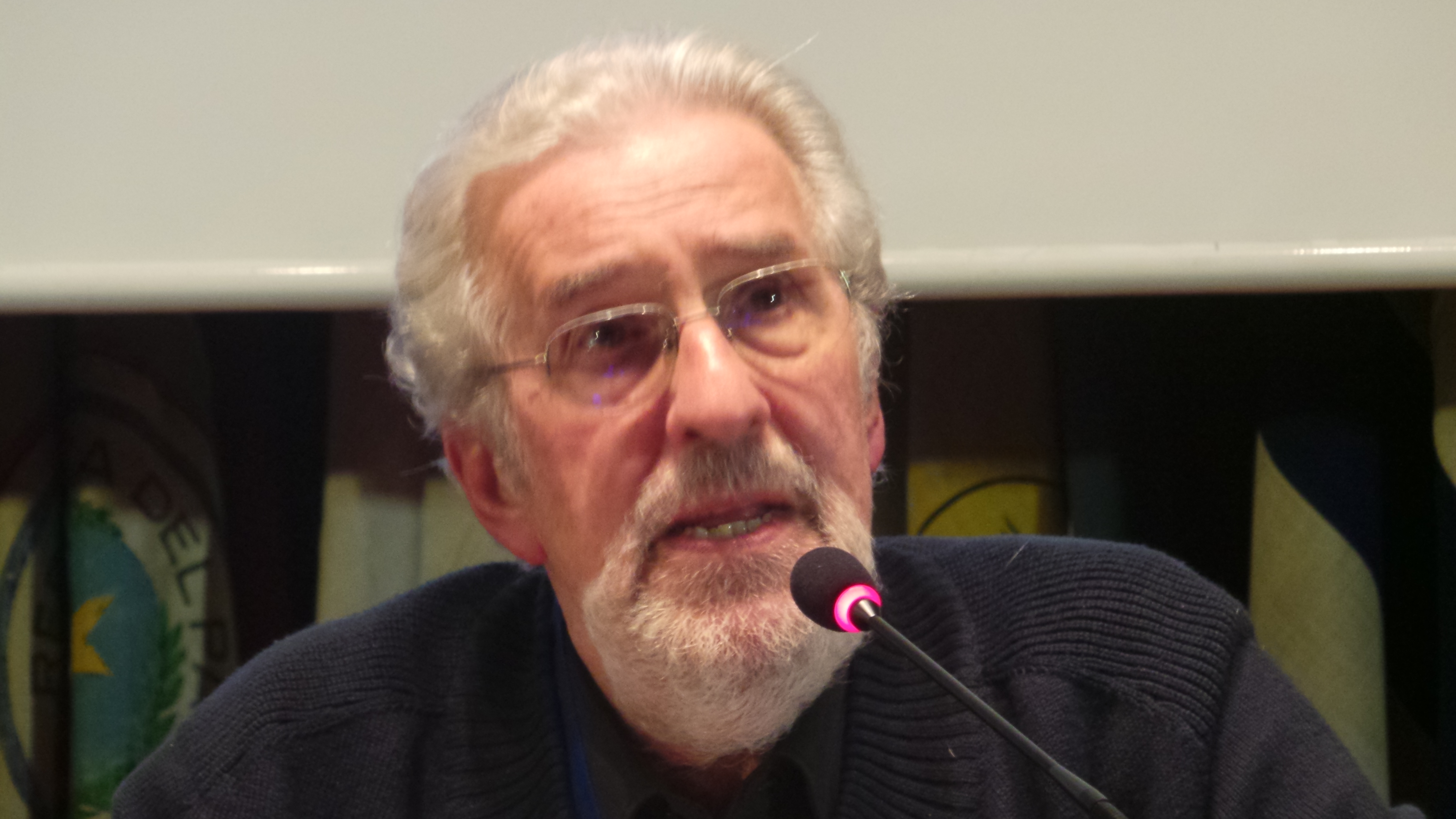
- Born: July 1, 1943 (age 81); Buenos Aires, Argentina
- Occupation: Sociologist

Atilio Borón is an Argentine Marxist sociologist.

== Biography ==
Atilio Borón received a PhD from Harvard University.

He worked as a Professor of Political Science at the Latin American Social Sciences Institute and at the University of Buenos Aires. He also served as Secretary General of CLACSO, an academic umbrella body for Latin America. In 2005, he signed the World Social Forum's Porto Alegre Manifesto.

At the Transnational Institute, he serves as Director of the Latin American Programme of Distance Education for Buenos Aires, Argentina, and a collaborator of the New Politics project. He also serves as director of the Center for European and Latin American Research in Buenos Aires. He also writes a column in a national Argentine newspaper.

He has called the United States a "terrorist threat to world peace". He has also been critical of Israel's systemic racism. He has voiced his disapproval of the American handling of Julian Assange. Borón has also condemned Barack Obama for ordering the murder of Muammar Gaddafi.

In 2009 he received the International José Martí Prize from UNESCO for his contribution to integration of Latin American and Caribbean countries.

== Bibliography ==
- The Right and Democracy in Latin America (co-edited with Douglas A Chalmers and Maria Do Carmo Campello de Souza, 1992)
- State, Capitalism, and Democracy in Latin America (1995)
- Peronismo y Menemismo: Avatares del Populismo En La Argentina (1995)
- Tiempos Violentos: Neoliberalismo, Globalizacion y Desigualdad En America Latina (1999)
- Tras El Buho de Minerva: Mercado Contra Democracia En El Capitalismo de Fin de Siglo (2000)
- The Clasicos En El Debate Latinoamericano (2002)
- Estado, Capitalismo y Democracia En America Latina (2004)
- Nueva Hegemonia Mundial: Alternativas de Cambio y Movimientos Sociales (2004)
- Las Reformas Educativas En Los Paises del Cono Sur (2005)
- Empire and Imperialism: A Critical Reading of Michael Hardt and Antonio Negri (2005)
- Que Hacer? (2005)
- La Teoria Marxista Hoy: Problemas y Perspectivas (2006)
- Politica y Movimientos Sociales En Un Mundo Hegemonico (with Gladys Lechini, 2006)
- Reflexiones Sobre El Poder, El Estado y La Revolucion (2007)
- Socialismo Siglo XXI: Hay Vida Despues del Neoliberalismo? (2008)
- América Latina en la Geopolítica del Imperialismo (2012)
- El hechicero de la tribu. Mario Vargas Llosa y el liberalismo en América Latina (Ediciones Akal, S.A., 2019)
