= World Social Forum =

Social movement organization

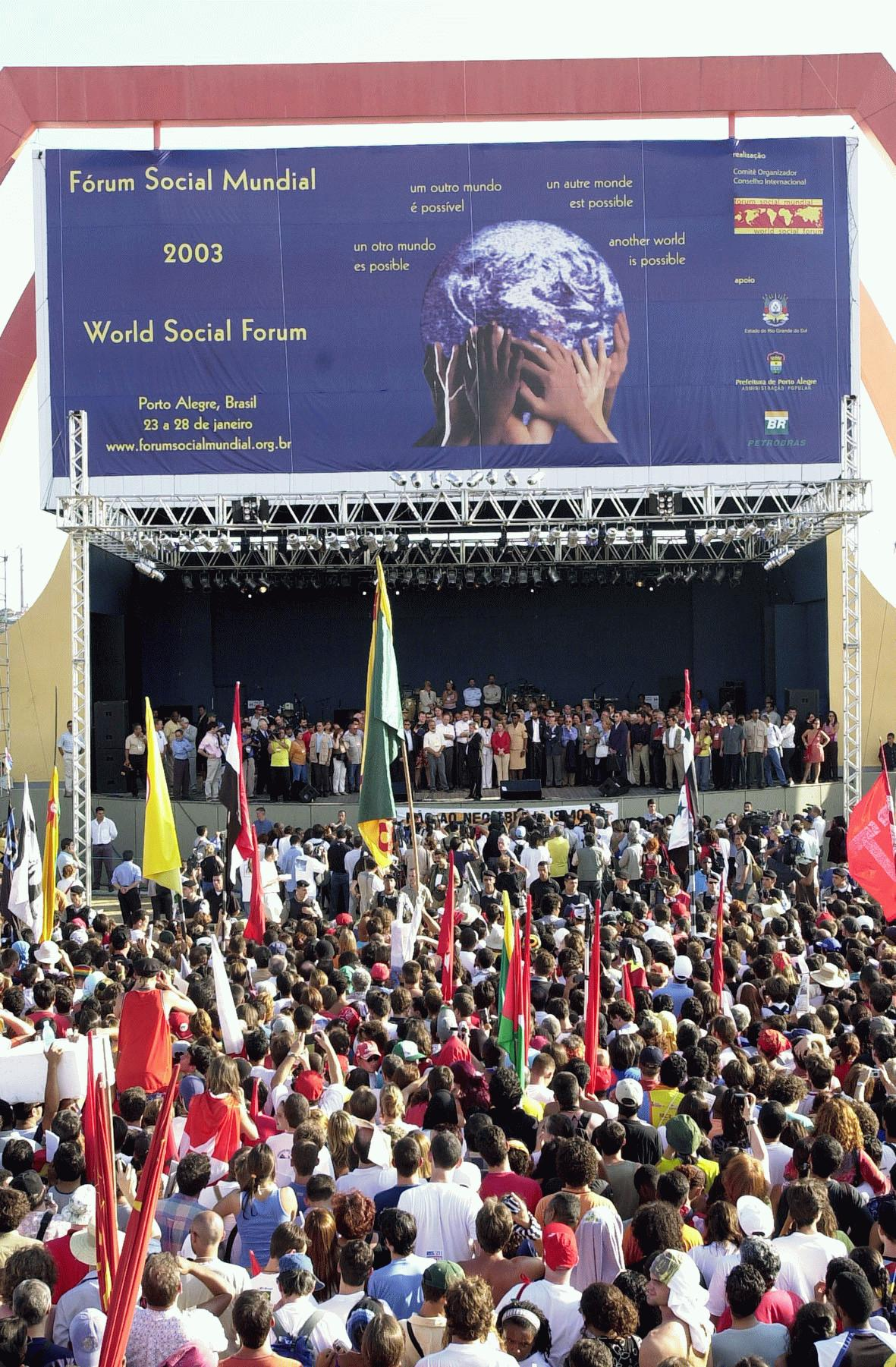
- World Social Forum 2003
- Formation: January 2001
- Founder: Oded Grajew; Chico Whitaker
- Headquarters: Porto Alegre, Brazil
- Region served: Worldwide
- Website: Official Website

The World Social Forum (WSF; Portuguese: Fórum Social Mundial [ˈfɔɾũ sosi'aw mũdʒiˈaw]) is an annual meeting of civil society organizations, first held in Brazil, which offers a self-conscious effort to develop an alternative future through the championing of counter-hegemonic globalization.

World-Social-Forum logo

The World Social Forum can be considered a visible manifestation of global civil society, bringing together non governmental organizations, advocacy campaigns, and formal and informal social movements seeking international solidarity. The World Social Forum prefers to define itself as "an open space – plural, diverse, non-governmental and non-partisan – that stimulates the decentralized debate, reflection, proposal building, experiences exchange and alliances among movements and organizations engaged in concrete action towards a more solidary, democratic and fair world; a permanent space and process to build alternatives to neoliberalism."

The World Social Forum is held by members of the alter-globalization movement (also referred to as the global justice movement) who come together to coordinate global campaigns, share and refine organizing strategies, and inform each other about movements from around the world and their particular issues. The World Social Forum is explicit about not being a representative of all of those who attend and thus does not publish any formal statements on behalf of participants. It tends to meet in January at the same time as its "great capitalist rival", the World Economic Forum's Annual Meeting in Davos, Switzerland. This date is consciously picked to promote alternative answers to world economic problems in opposition to the World Economic Forum.

== History ==
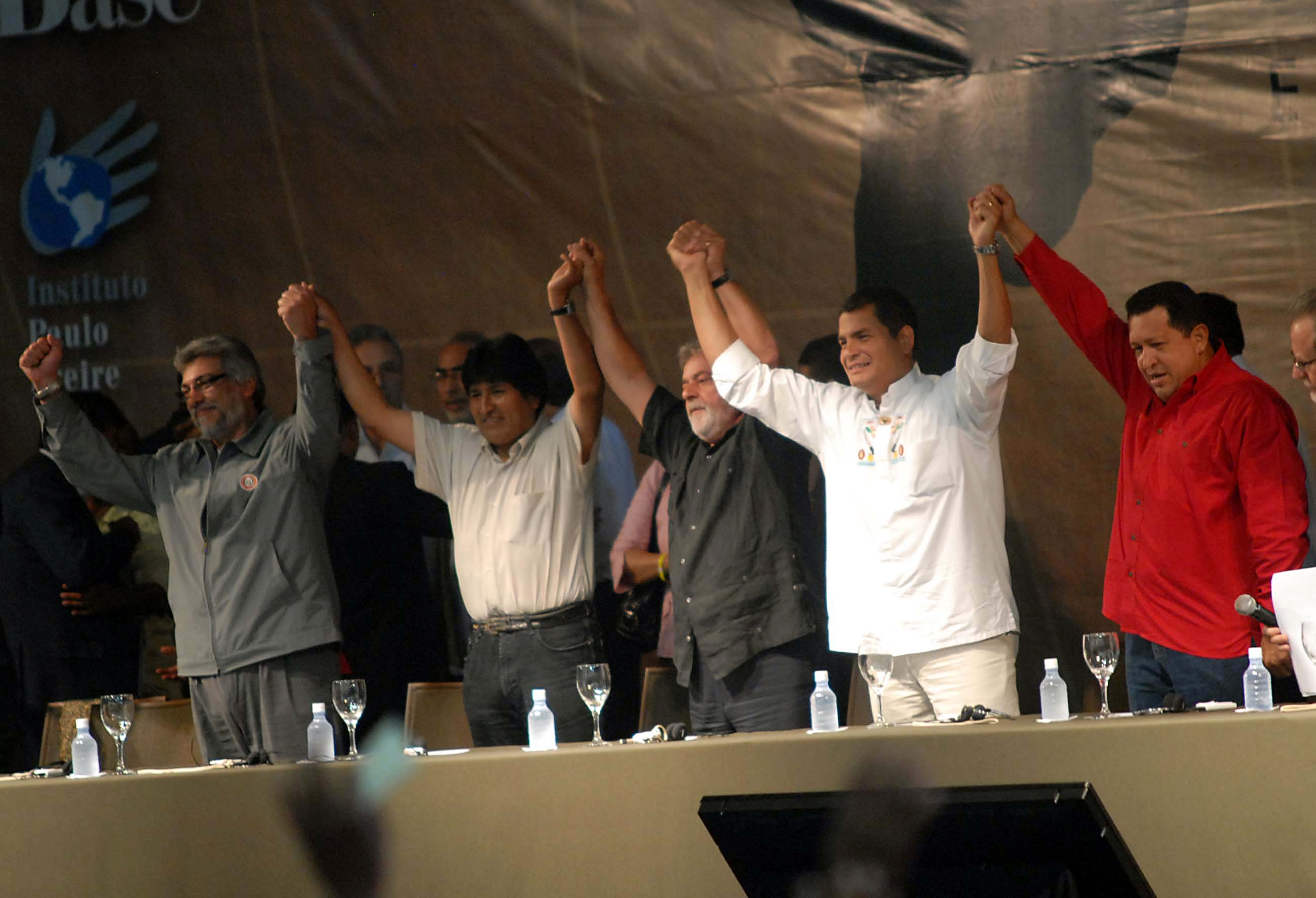
Fórum Social Mundial 2008-From left to right: Paraguayan President Fernando Lugo, Bolivian President Evo Morales of Bolivia, Brazilian President Luiz Inácio Lula da Silva, Ecuadorian President Rafael Correaand Venezuelan President Hugo Chavez at the Latin American Panel of the 2009 World Social Forum

The World Social Forum first met in 2001, but it had its roots in Latin American activism, namely the encuentro, a meeting which emphasizes dialogue and exchange of ideas among activists. Some of the founders of the WSF, were part of the First International Encuentro for Humanity and Against Neoliberalism in 1996, and decided to expand the idea and make it a global forum for activists of all stripes opposing hegemonic globalization and neoliberalism.

The World Social Forum can also part, trace its tradition of activism back to the Battle for Seattle November 1999, where anti-globalization activists protested a meeting of the World Trade Organization's latest trade negotiations.

One of the originators of the World Social Forum, Oded Grajew, of the Ethos Institute for Business and Social Responsibility, said in an interview with InMotion Magazine in 2004, "Then I had the idea. Why not create the World Social Forum, as we have the World Economic Forum, speaking about the people in the world? Why not have the World Social Forum—the social is more important than the economic—to have a space to show that we can have an alternative? We have choice. This is not the only way you can see the world, globalization. We have another way to see it. And, at the same time, force people to look, to make a choice. What is your choice? What is your vision of the world?"

Another one of the founders of the WSF, Cándido Grzybowski has said of the annual meetings, "The numerous recent crises are expressions of the contradictions and limitations of the form of global capitalism that has been imposed on humanity and the earth. The assertion that "another world is possible" is now an absolute necessity."

Since 2001, the United Nations has had a presence at the WSF through UNESCO, showing the institutional credibility achieved by the forum, seen by UNESCO as a "prime opportunity for dialogue and a laboratory of ideas for the renewal of public policies" through "critical reflection on the future of societies we want to create and for elaborating proposals in search of solidarity, justice, peace and human rights".

=== 2003 World Social Forum ===
The third WSF was again held in Porto Alegre, in January 2003. There were multiple parallel workshops, including, for example the Life After Capitalism workshop, which proposed focused discussion on anti-capitalism and participative possibilities for different aspects of social, political, economic, communication structures. Among the speakers was American linguist and political activist Noam Chomsky. Some credit this meeting of World Social Forum for the connections that made the global day of action on February 15, 2003 so successful. The global day of action was an international protest attended by an estimated 12 million people in 700 cities across 60 countries protesting the Bush Administration's plans to invade and occupy Iraq. At the time, the New York Times called international public opinion a superpower to counter the United States.

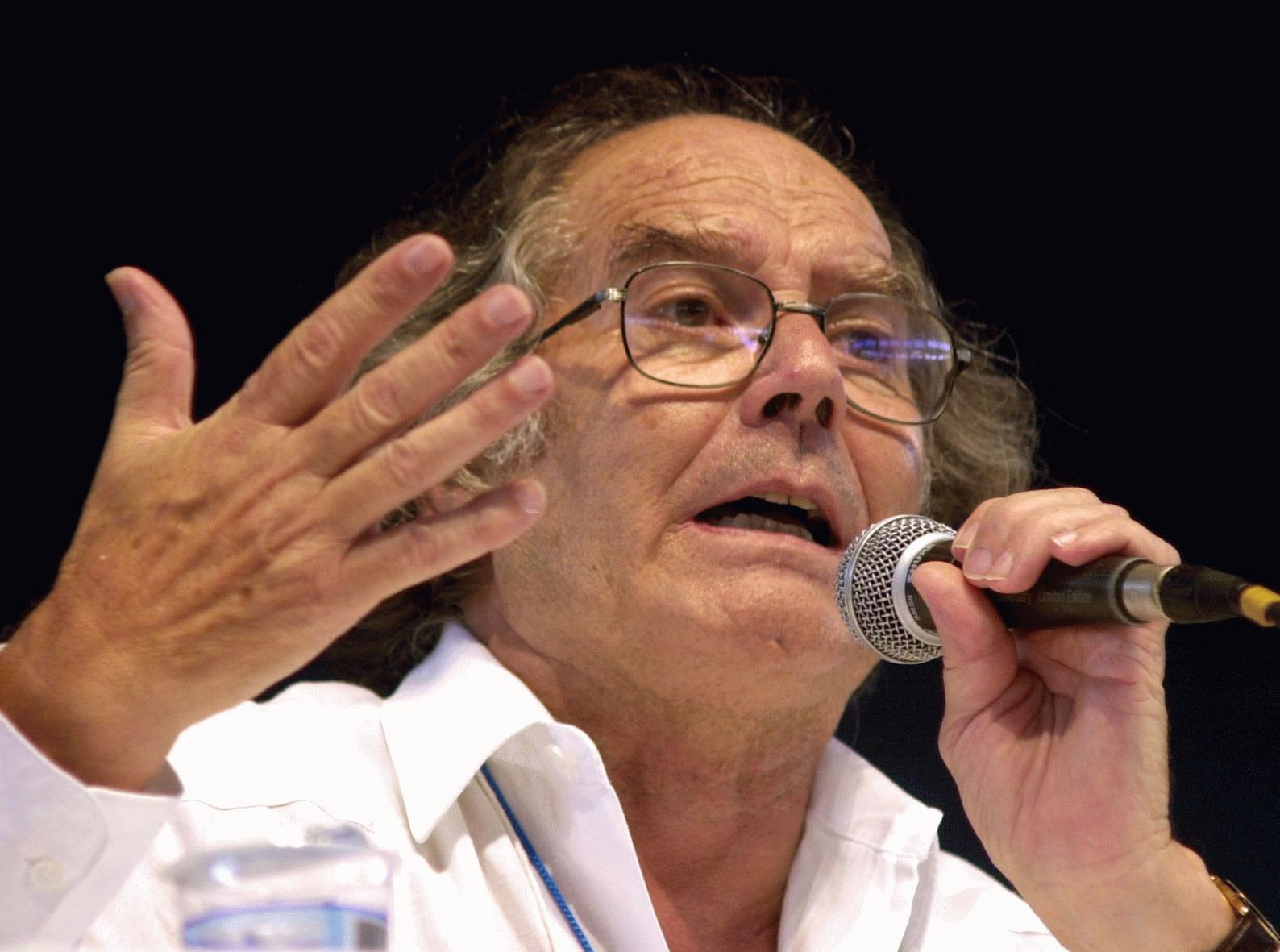
Nobel Peace Prize laureate Adolfo Pérez Esquivel

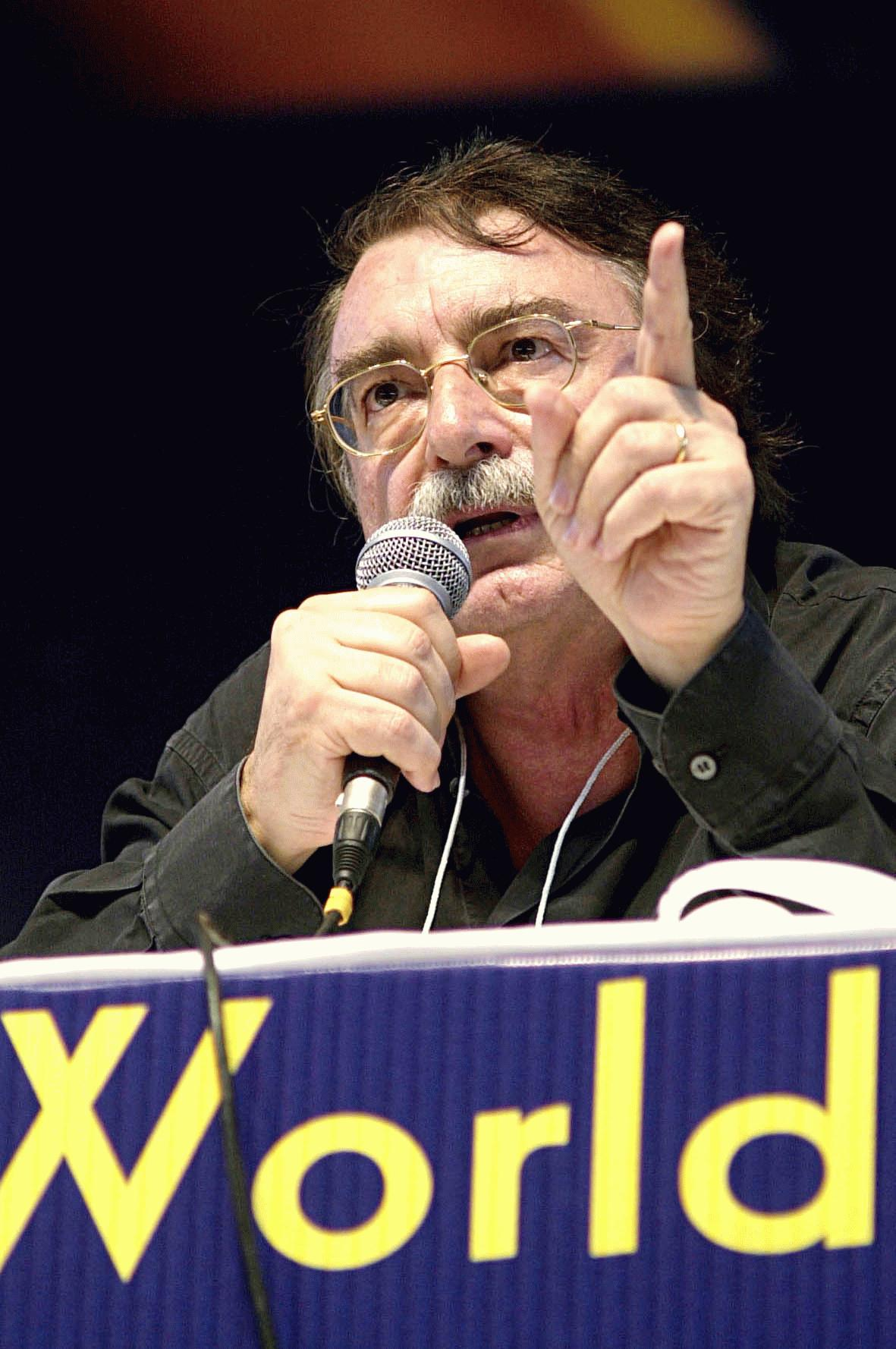
Ignacio Ramonet, then editor-in-chief of Le Monde diplomatique

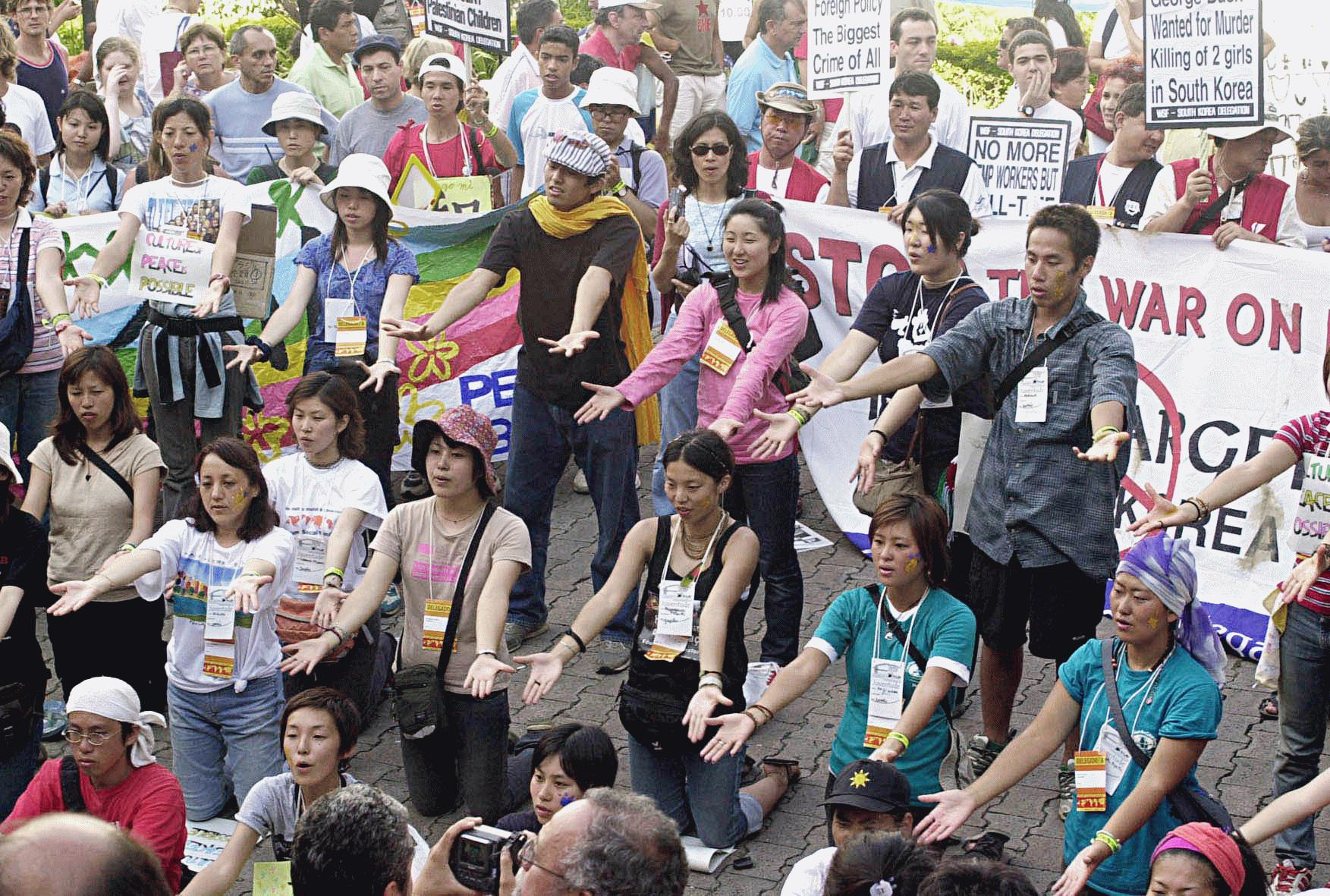
Protest by the Japanese delegation

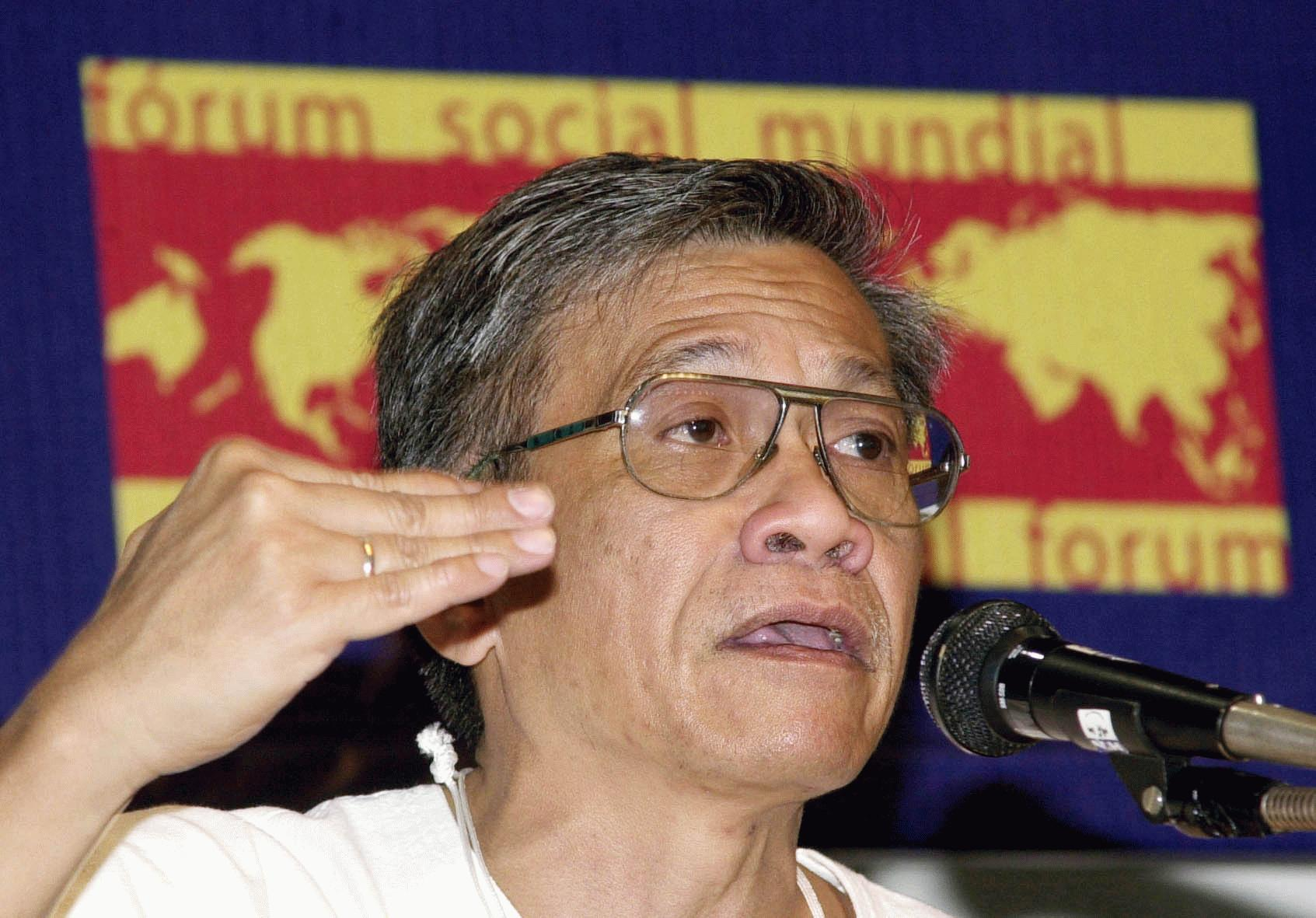
Walden Bello, executive director of the Focus on the Global South NGO

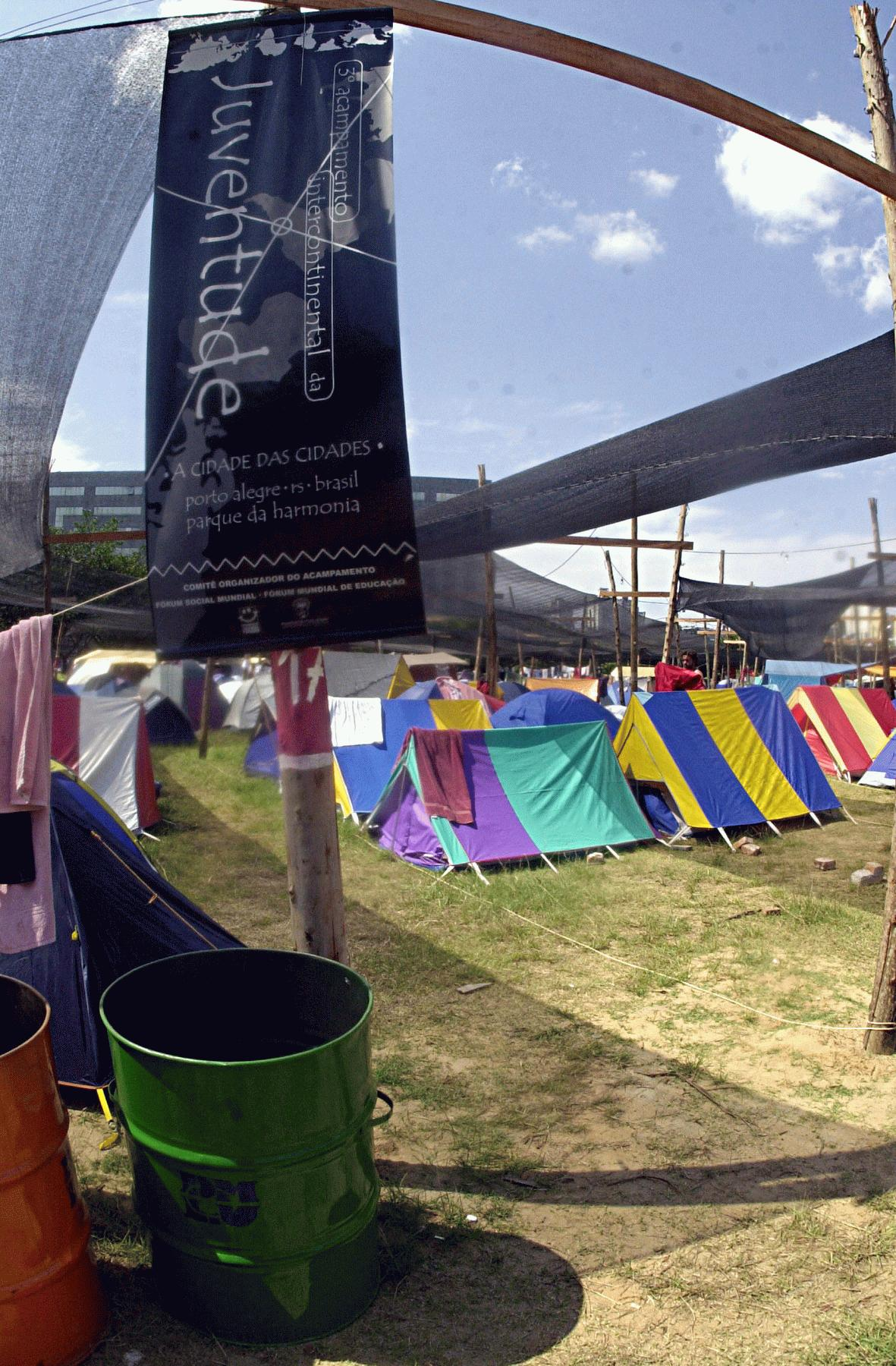
Youth camp

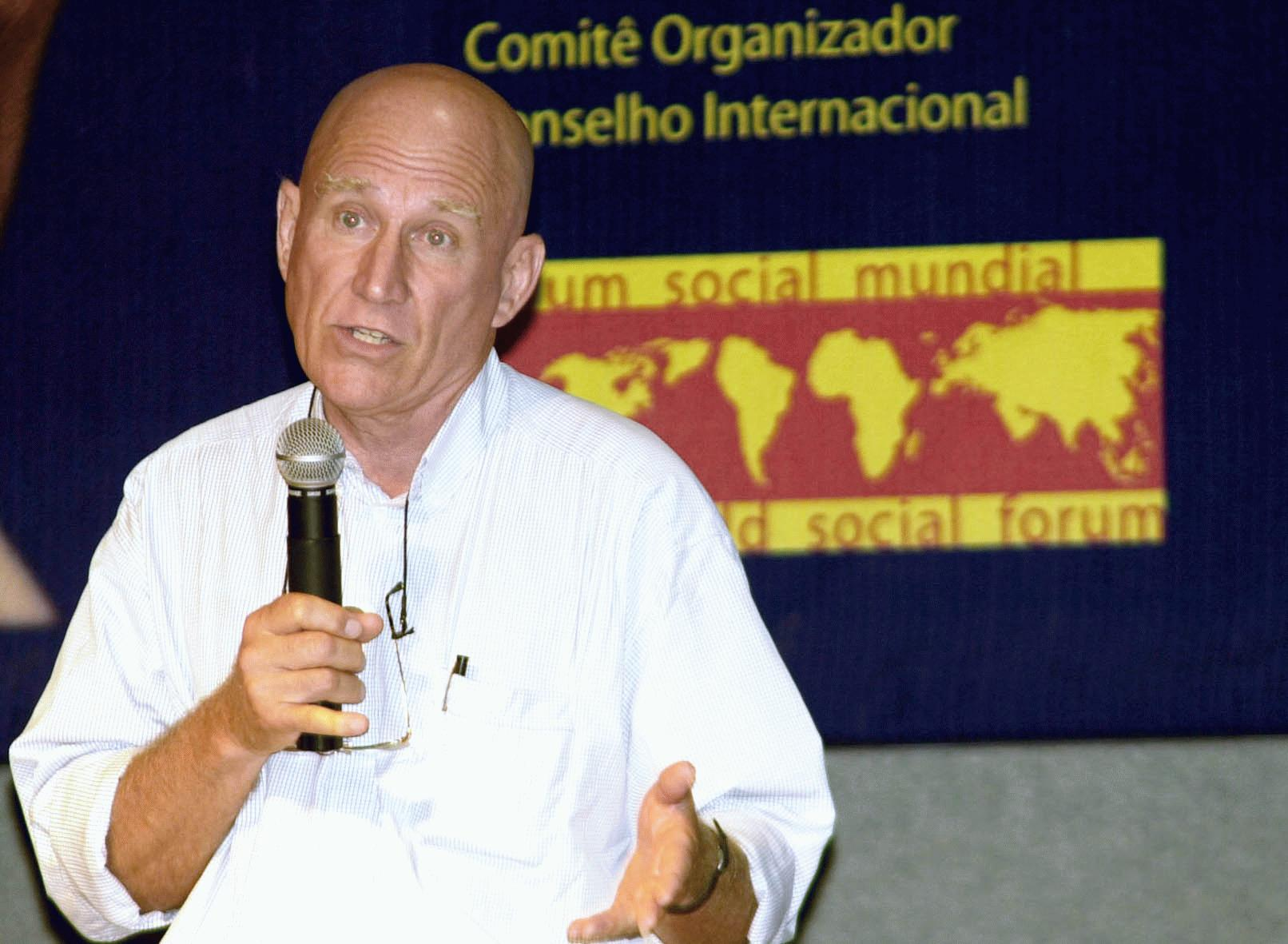
Social documentary photographer Sebastião Salgado

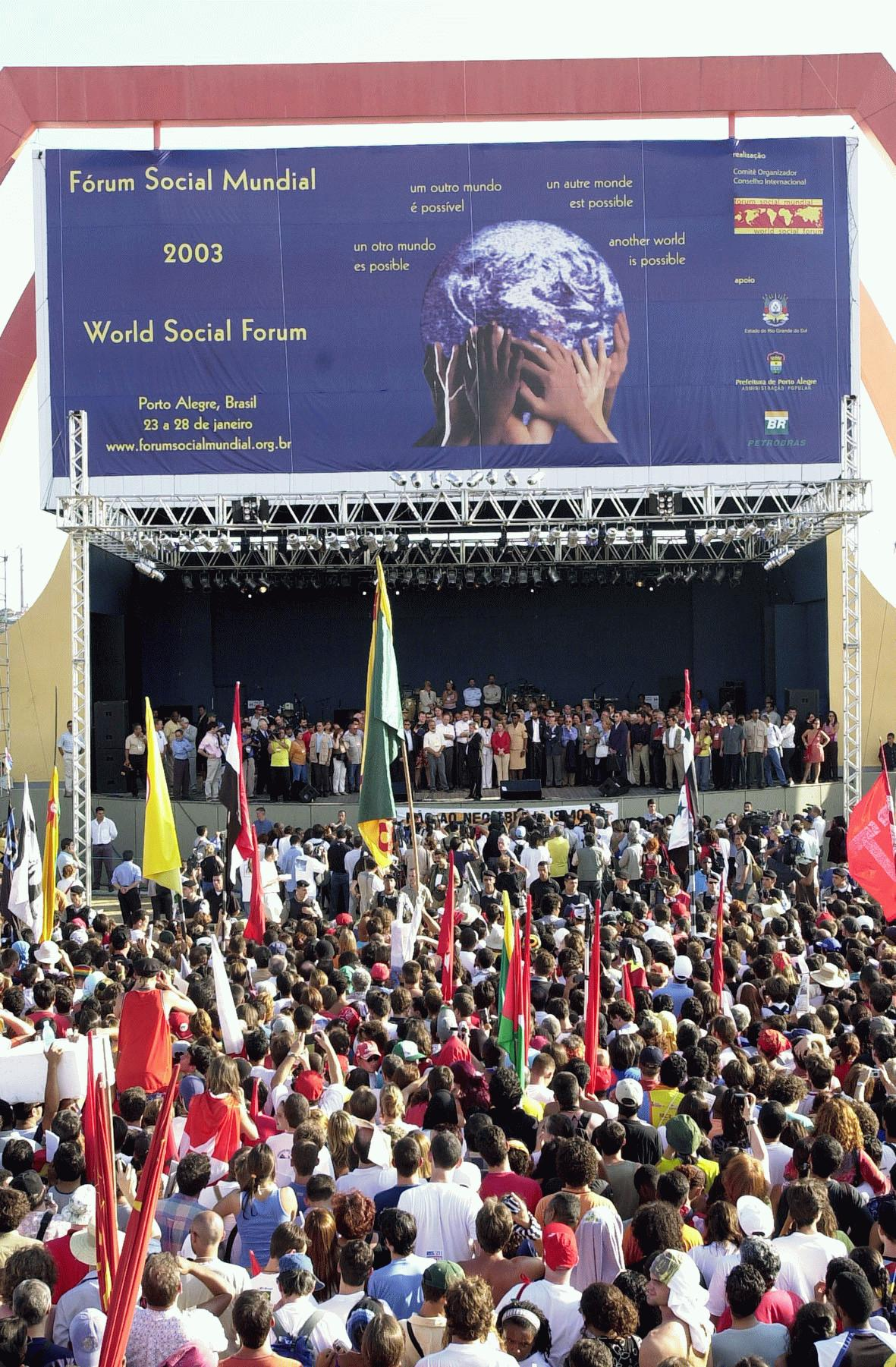
Crowd gathering

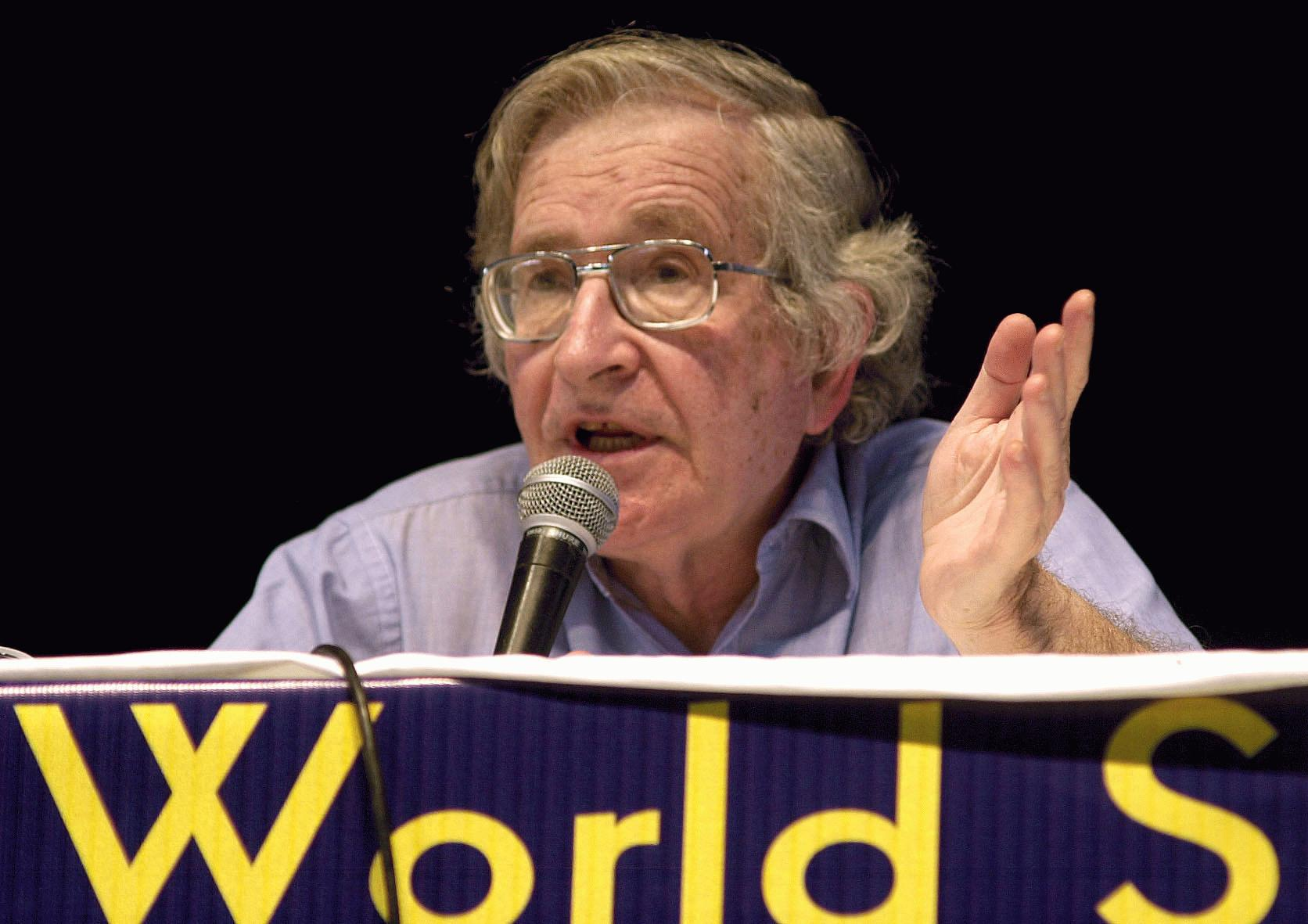
Professor and activist Noam Chomsky

=== 2004 World Social Forum ===
The fourth WSF was held in Mumbai, India, from 16 January to 21 January 2004. It was the first meeting of the World Social Forum held outside Brazil and its success has encouraged the WSF to expand in scope across the global South. Some credit it with inspiring the Asian Social Forum held in November of that year. The attendance was expected to be 75,000 and it shot over by thousands. The cultural diversity was one notable aspect of the forum. A notable decision that was taken was the stand on free software. One of the key speakers at the WSF 2004 was Joseph Stiglitz. In contrast to earlier meetings, which had focused more on Euro-centric political intellectualism, the 2004 meeting included marches, as well as colorful and lively demonstrations.

The 2004 meeting also saw the convening of the General Assembly of the Global Anti-War Movement, an idea that originated from the Asian Social Forum in November 2003, and broadly coalesced in response to the invasion of Iraq by the United States in 2003. The Assembly had few activists from the United States, but overwhelmingly tried to articulate that they opposed the policy, and not the country itself. The former director-general of UNESCO, Federico Mayor Zaragoza, said at the Forum, "We must state it clearly. We must say to President Bush that we do not agree with the way he controls the world. We must tell him that he has to govern with his mind, not with might."

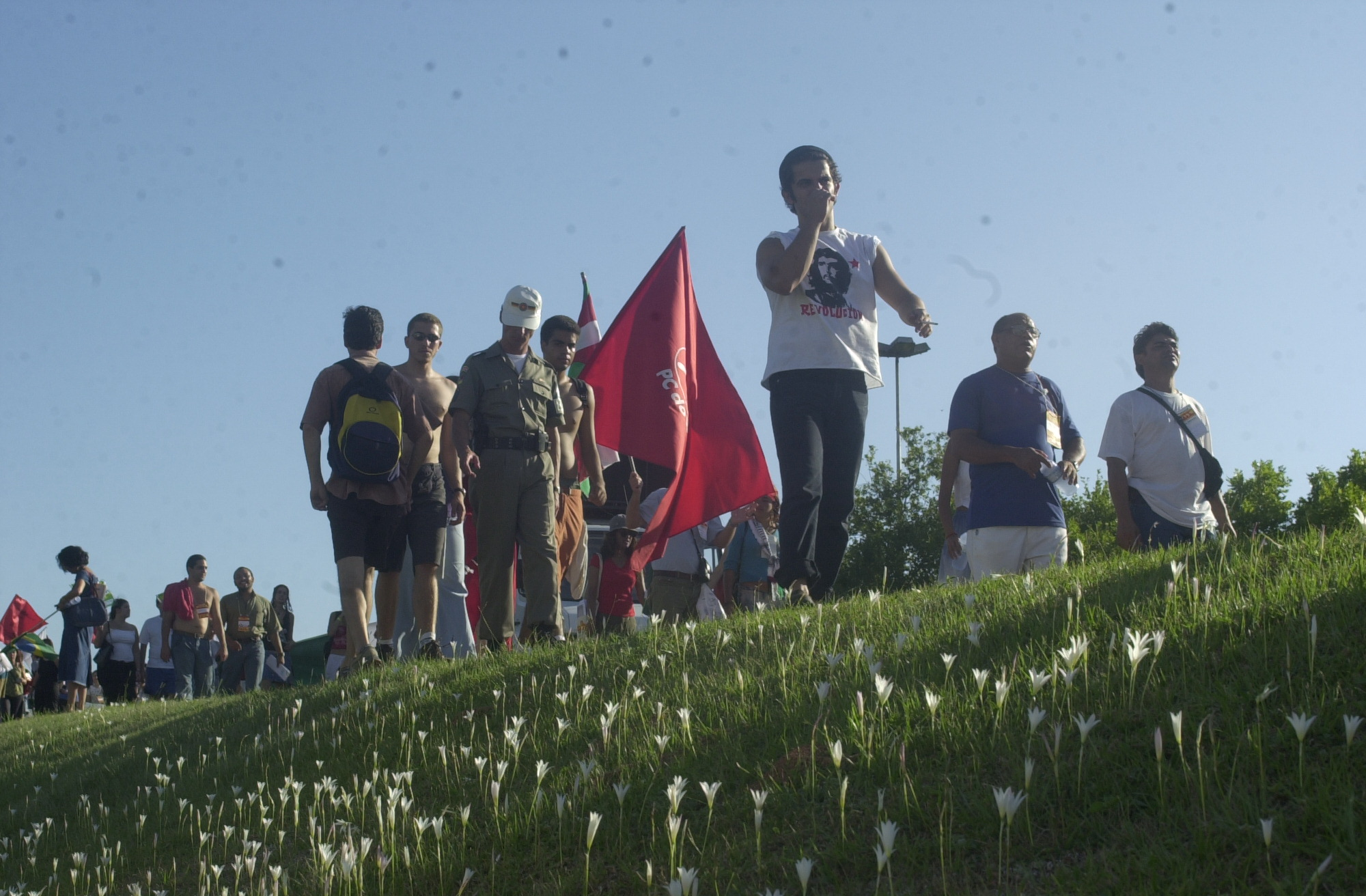
WSF-Brazil-che 2005

=== 2005 World Social Forum ===
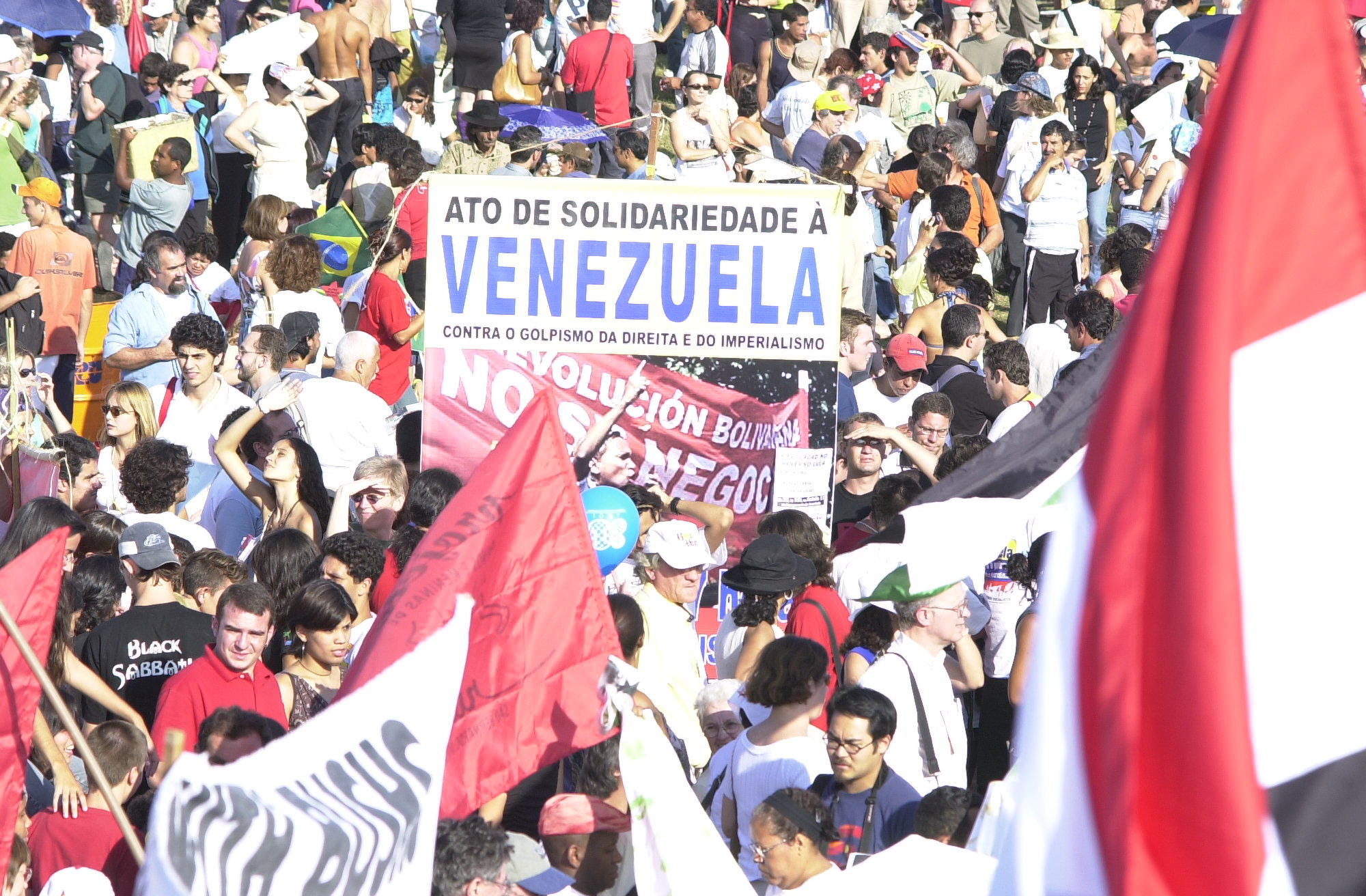
World Social Forum - Porto Alegre Brazil 2005

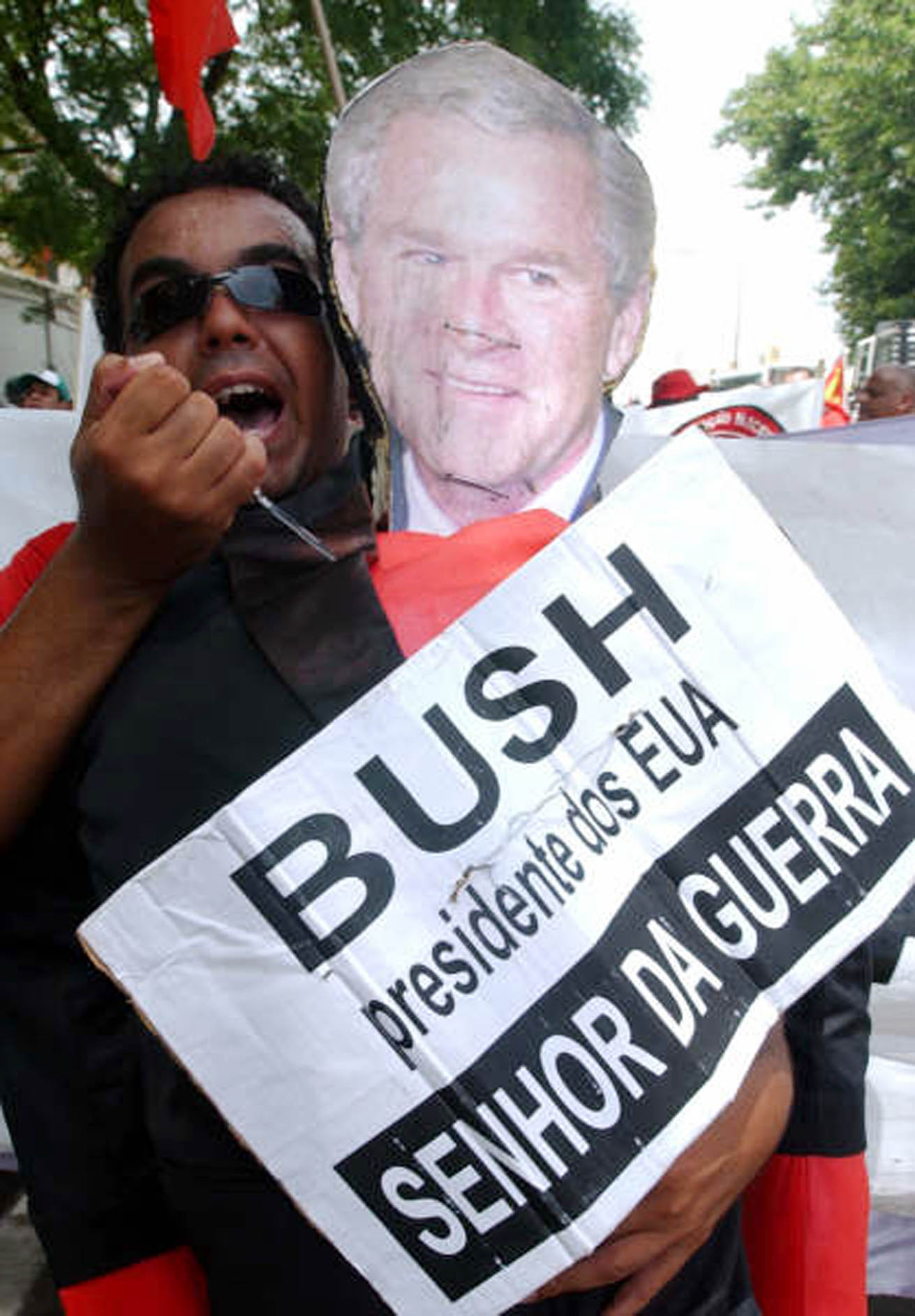
World Social Forum-2005-Brazil-killing-Bush

The fifth World Social Forum 2005 was held in Porto Alegre, Brazil between 26 January and 31 January. There were 155,000 registered participants at the Forum, with most coming from Brazil, Argentina, the United States, Uruguay, and France. A number of participants in the forum released the Porto Alegre Manifesto. Since Article 6 of the World Social Forum's Charter of Principles bars the event from attempting to represent all participants through formal statements, the Porto Alegre Manifesto was released on behalf of 19 activists. This 'Group of 19' includes Aminata Traoré, Adolfo Pérez Esquivel, Eduardo Galeano, José Saramago, François Houtart, Boaventura de Sousa Santos, Armand Mattelart, Roberto Savio, Riccardo Petrella, Ignacio Ramonet, Bernard Cassen, Samir Amin, Atilio Borón, Samuel Ruiz García, Tariq Ali, Frei Betto, Emir Sader, Walden Bello, and Immanuel Wallerstein.

=== 2006 World Social Forum ===
The sixth World Social Forum was "polycentric", held in January 2006 in Caracas, Venezuela and Bamako, Mali, and in March 2006, in Karachi, Pakistan. The Forum in Pakistan was delayed to March because of the Kashmir earthquake that had recently occurred in the area.

=== 2007 World Social Forum ===
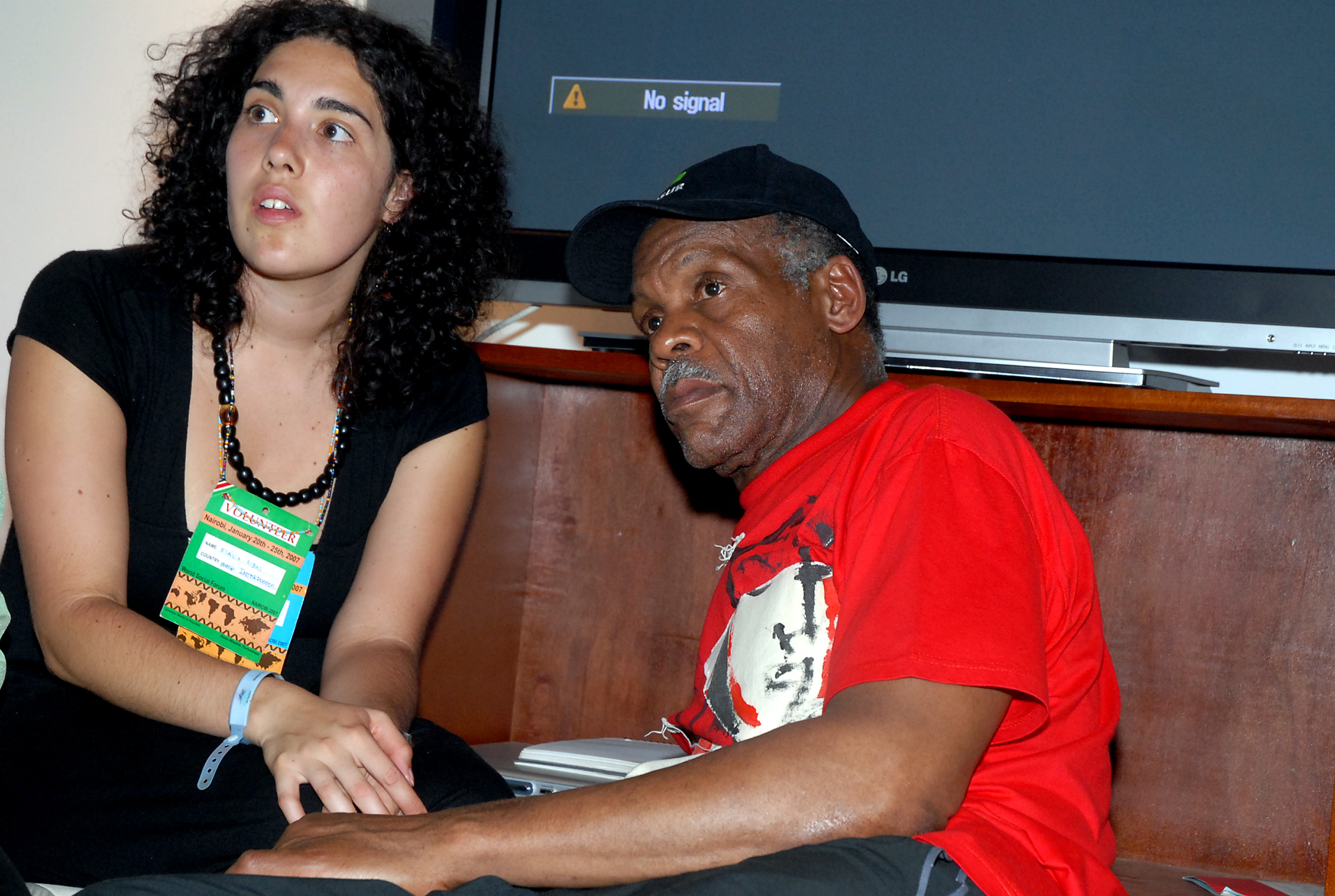
Danny Glover Forum Social Mundial Nairobi

The seventh World Social Forum was held in Nairobi, Kenya in January 2007. There were 66,000 registered attendees, and 1,400 participating organizations from 110 countries, making it the most globally representative WSF so far. It was criticized as being 'an NGO fair' and movements of the poor in Kenya and South Africa mounted vigorous protests against some of the NGOs that attended and, in their view, dominated the forum in the name of the African poor.

=== 2009 World Social Forum ===
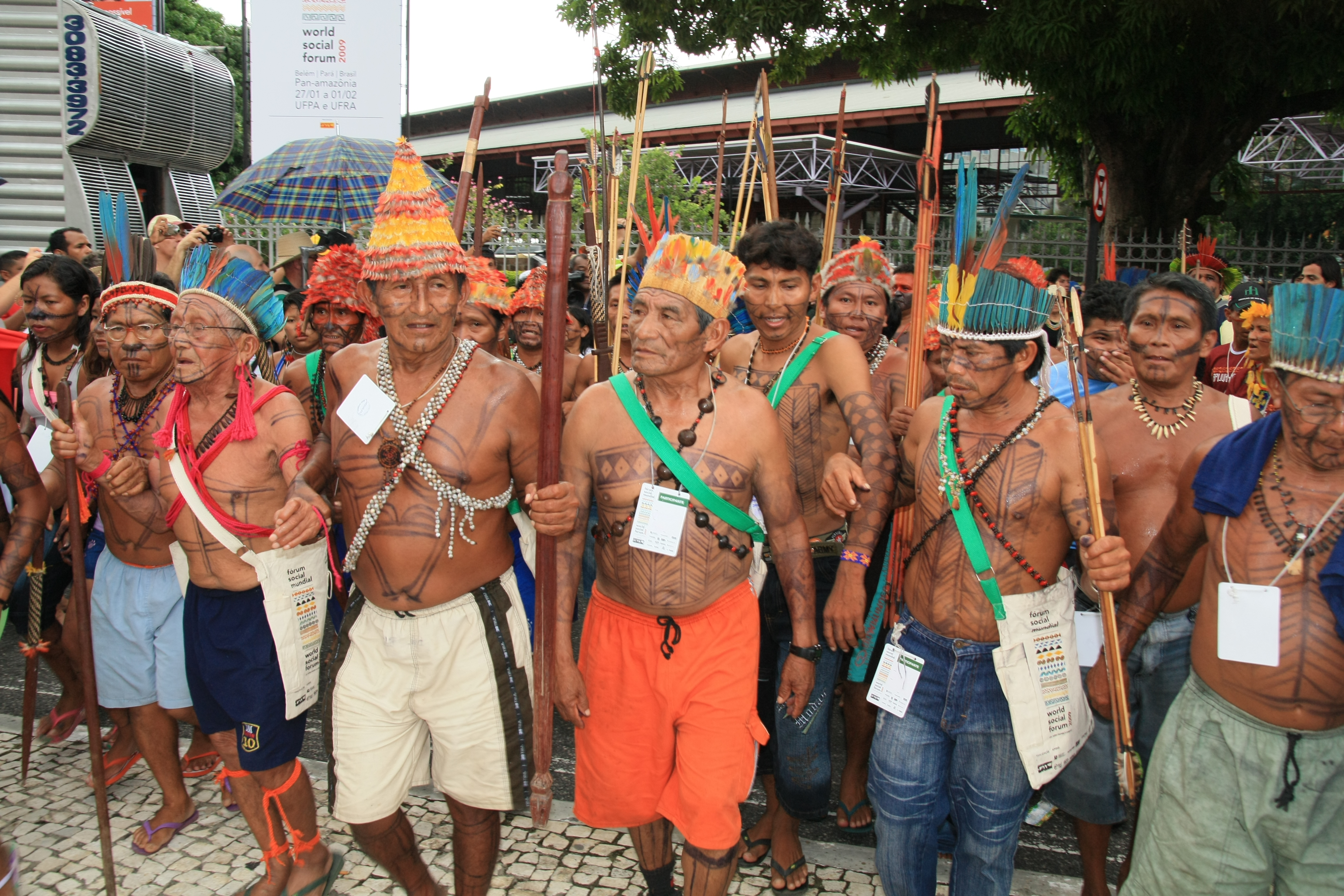
Forum Social Mundial 2009

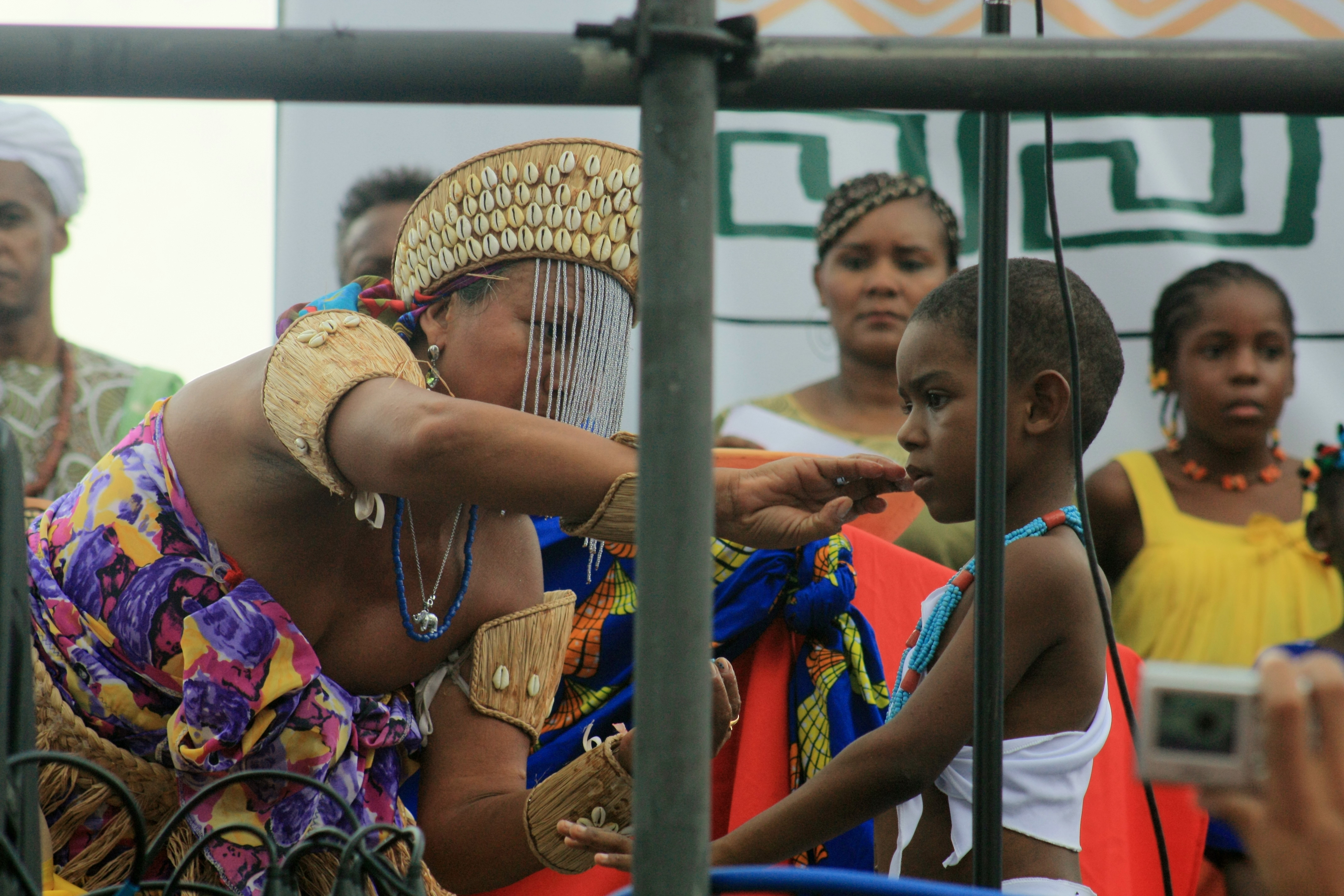

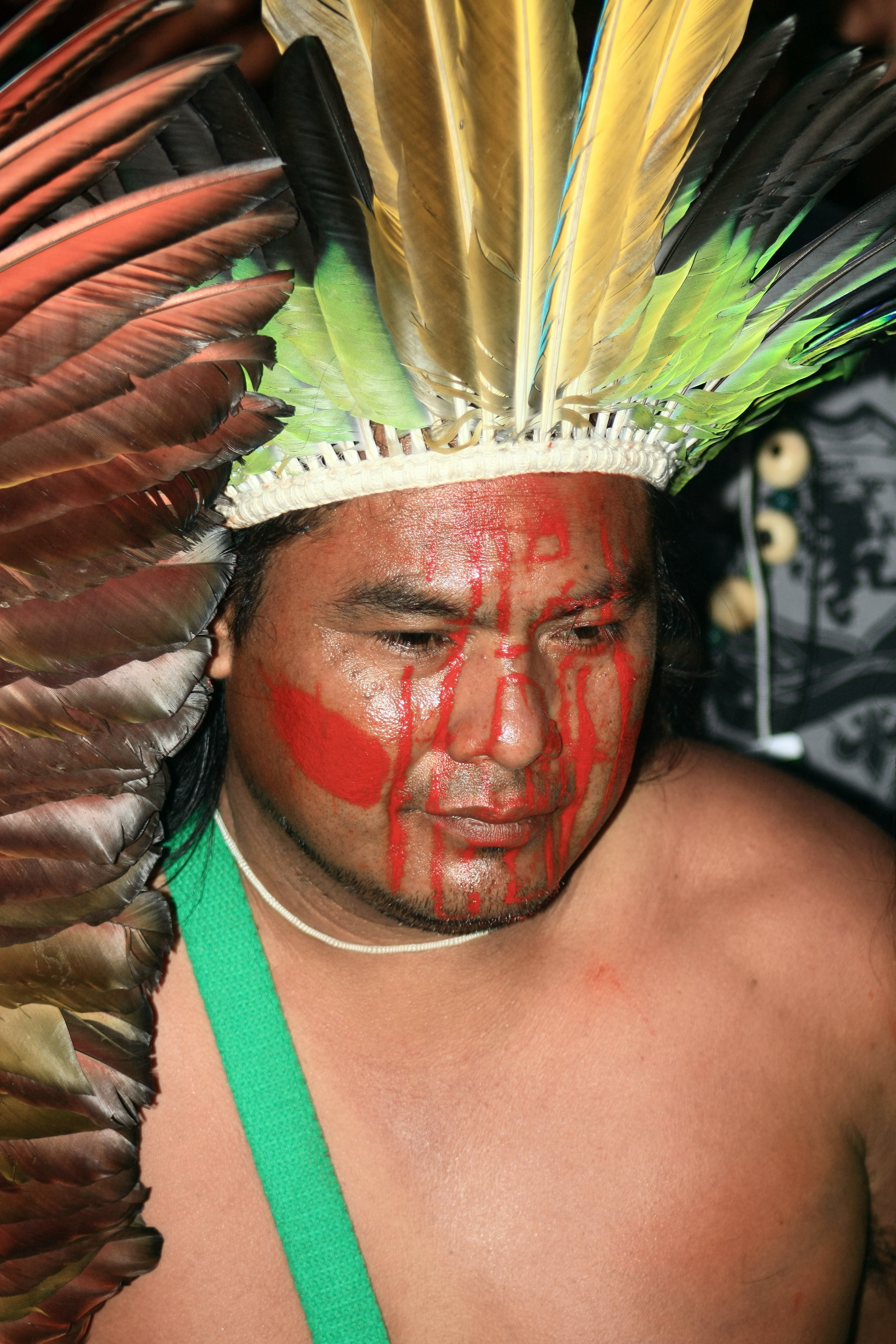

The ninth World Social Forum took place in the Brazilian city of Belém, located in the Amazon rainforest, between January 27 and February 1, 2009. About 1,900 indigenous people, representing 190 ethnic groups attended the event, to raise the issue of stateless peoples, and the plights that they face. The Escarré International Centre for Ethnic Minorities and Nations helped to organize the tent for the Collective Rights of Stateless Peoples, who are marginalized in an international system that recognizes only states as political units. Various stateless ethnic groups represented were the Basques, Kurds, Palestinians, Roma, Tibetans, Mapuche, Saharawi and Australian Aborigines.

=== 2010 World Social Forum ===
The tenth edition of the World Social Forum was another decentralized affair, with about 35 national, regional and local forums taking place across the world. In Porto Alegre, the flagship space for the WSF, events and speakers were held from January 25–29, entitled "FSM 10 Years: Greater Porto Alegre". The big event held in Porto Alegre was the International Seminar "10 Years Later: Challenges and proposals for another possible world", which featured over 70 intellectuals from around the world. One of the notable regional forums was the US Social Forum held in Detroit, Michigan and attended by about 18,000 people.

=== 2011 World Social Forum ===
The 2011 World Social Forum was hosted in Dakar, Senegal and ran from 06 to 11 February.

=== 2012 World Social Forum ===
The 2012 World Social Forum was hosted in Porto Alegre, Brazil and ran from 24 to 30 January.

=== 2013 World Social Forum ===
The thirteenth edition of the World Social Forum took place in Tunis from 26 to 30 March 2013.

=== 2015 World Social Forum ===
The fourteenth edition of the World Social Forum took place in Tunis from 23 to 28 March 2015. It led to the creation of the Internet Social Forum.

=== 2016 World Social Forum ===
The fifteenth edition of the World Social Forum took place in Montreal from 9 to 14 August 2016. It was a multilingual event which featured organizations from around the world.

=== 2018 World Social Forum ===
The sixteenth edition of the World Social Forum took place in Salvador, Bahia, Brazil, from March 13 to 17, 2018. Having representatives of 120 countries.

=== 2021 World Social Forum ===
The 2021 World Social Forum was hosted virtually from 23 to 31 January 2021. Representatives from 144 countries attended the forum, with 1,371 organizations participating. The digital events attracted over 78,000 visits.

=== 2022 World Social Forum ===
The 2022 World Social Forum was held in a hybrid format, with in-person events in Mexico City, and virtual events from 1 to 6 May 2022. Preliminary data from the World Social Forum reported attendance from 500 organizations, 2,080 participants, and over 31,230 online visitors.

=== 2024 World Social Forum ===
The 2024 World Social Forum took place in Kathmandu from 15 to 19 February 2024.

== Regional Social Forums ==
The WSF has prompted the organizing of multiple regional social forums, including the Americas Social Forum, European Social Forum, the Asian Social Forum, the Mediterranean Social Forum and the Southern Africa Social Forum. There are also a number of local and national social forums, such as the Norwegian Social Forum, Iraqi Social Forum, Italian Social Forum, India Social Forum, Liverpool Social Forum and the Boston Social Forum. The first-ever United States Social Forum took place in Atlanta in June 2007. In 2010 Detroit, Michigan, hosted the United States Social Forum during June 22–26.

Regional forums have taken place in the Southwest, Northwest, Northeast, Midwest and Southeast regions of the United States. The first Canadian Social Forum took place in June 2010.

Most, though not all, social forums adhere to the WSF Charter of Principles drawn up by the World Social Forum. The goal of these forums is to decentralize and allow far more people to engage in the open forum atmosphere of the World Social Forum without needing very much money for travel expenses. All of the various social forums in this mold include international attendees and are in no way specifically focused on the problems of a single region of country.

== Criticisms ==
=== 2001 Monsanto Incident ===
On January 26, 2001 a number of activists with Brazil's Movimento dos Sem-Terra (MST) reacted in protest to the growing role of Monsanto in global agribusiness, which was considered by the group to be unethically using their seed patents to harm the rights of rural peoples, tore up an experimental plot of transgenic crops in Não-me-Toque, 300 kilometres (190 mi) from Porto Alegre, where the World Social Forum was taking place at the time. Three days later, Jose Bove, a French citizen, was arrested by Brazilian authorities as the World Social Forum ended on January 29, 2001. Connections between the Movimento dos Sem-Terra and the World Social Forum are not well known.

=== Role of NGOs ===
The WSF has, especially in recent years, been strongly criticised for replacing popular movements with non-governmental organizations (NGOs). A delegation from the South Africa-based Abahlali baseMjondolo criticised the event's 2009 iteration as "dominated by" non-governmental organizations. The group also argued in 2007 that the participating NGOs would sometimes compete with popular movements for access to the forum and for influence there.

The 2007 World Social Forum in Nairobi, Kenya was criticized as an "NGO fair" by Firoze Manji, as he believed that the large number of international NGOs crowded out less formal groups of activists. He also asserted that not all the attendees were properly represented, with the bigger and wealthier NGOs having far more space to talk and lead the events.

Raúl Zibechi argues that there is a "crisis" of the World Social Forum in that it has been "weakened" as it has been "taken over" by "those who were most capable of 'leading' assemblies, professionals from universities and NGOs."

South African politician Andile Mngxitama sees the World Social Forum as mostly dominated by Northern NGOs, donors and activists, and argues that Southern representation is largely organized via Northern donors and their NGOs. Mngxitama also describes how popular organizations in the global South are systematically marginalized or included in a deeply subordinated manner.

Many grassroots movements in the global South boycott the forum and the NGOs that gate-keep participation in the forum and some actively oppose it as just one more space of domination.

=== Role of corporations ===
There was also criticism of the way that CelTel had exclusive rights at the Kenyan event, the virtual monopoly of a local hotel offering food at rates that the average Kenyan could not afford, and the physical and financial exclusion of local business.

=== Organization (2020) ===
A demographic transformation of the organisational background has taken place since a decade ago when critical voices were raised. As of 2020, preparatory meetings for the 2021 World Social Forum were run by a younger generation of female and male organisers while the founders (Oded Grajew and Chico Whiteker) usually did not intervene. Communicating languages were mainly Spanish and Portuguese (because of multiple Latin American organisers), and also English and French. New individuals, social groups and movements were invited to co-organise events in 2021; new ecological movements run by young generations, for example.

== See also ==
- Anti-globalization movement
- Category:Social forums – other social forums
- Liberty
- Social equality
