= Mediterranean Social Forum =

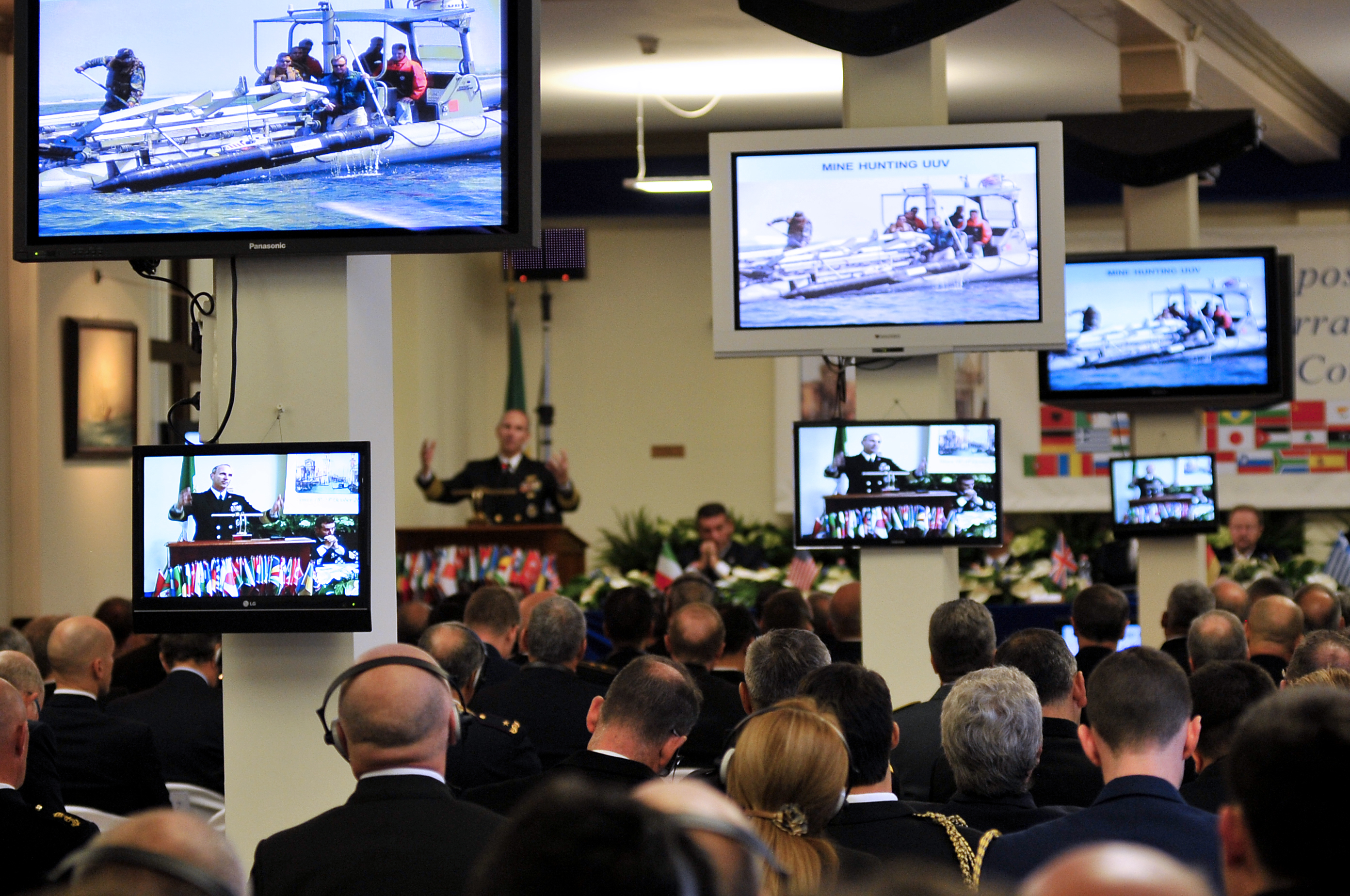
VENICE (Oct. 17, 2012) Chief of Naval Operations (CNO) Adm. Jonathan Greenert delivers remarks at the 9th Regional Seapower Symposium for the Navy of the Mediterranean and Black Sea Countries at the Italian Naval War College. The Regional Seapower Symposium was attended by representatives from 41 countries and provides a forum for international maritime forces to discuss ideas and different approaches to national defense. America’s Sailors are Warfighters, a fast and flexible force deployed worldwide. Join the conversation on social media using #warfighting. (U.S. Navy photo by Mass Communication Specialist 2nd Class Kyle P. Malloy/Released) 121017-N-YQ566-132 Join

The Mediterranean Social Forum (FSmed) is the first interregional Social Forum, created between movements from Europe, Maghreb and Mediterranean Middle East. FSmed was established in 2001.

== See also ==
- World social forum
- European Social Forum
