= Aminata Traoré (author) =

Malian author, politician and activist

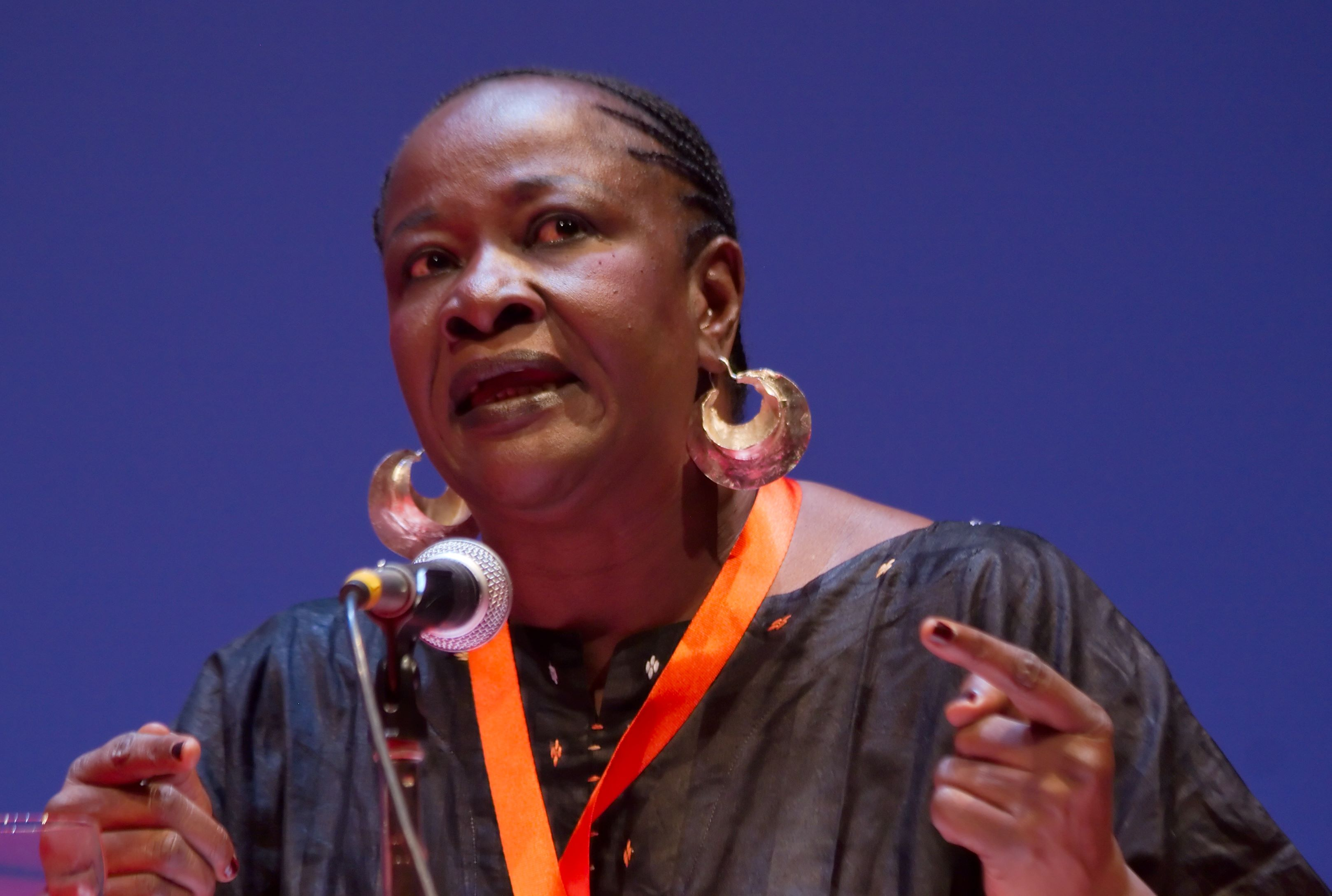
- Aminata Traoré in 2008 at the Libération forum in Grenoble

Minister of Culture and Tourism of Mali
- In office 1997–2000
- President: Alpha Oumar Konaré
- Prime Minister: Ibrahim Boubacar Keïta

Personal details
- Born: Aminata Dramane Traoré; 1947 (age 78–79) Bamako, Mali

Aminata Dramane Traoré (born 1947) is a Malian author, politician, and political activist. She served as the Minister of Culture and Tourism of Mali from 1997 to 2000 and also worked as coordinator of the United Nations Development Programme. She is the current Coordinator of Forum pour l'autre Mali and Associate Coordinator of the International Network for Cultural Diversity and was elected to the board of the International Press Service in July 2005. She is a member of the scientific committee of the Fundacion IDEAS, Spain's Socialist Party's think tank.

== Views ==
Traoré is a prominent critic of globalization and the economic policies of the most developed nations. Specifically, she has voiced opposition to the Western countries' subsidization of their own cotton farmers, which leaves West African countries at a disadvantage in competing for space in Western markets. Traoré is one of the signatories, or members of the Group of Nineteen, of the Porto Alegre Manifesto issued at the 2005 World Social Forum.

She defended Ahmed Sékou Touré, the long-time president of neighbouring Guinea, saying his bad reputation as a dictator and his attempts at exterminating the Fulas from the Fouta Djalon in Guinea were due to propaganda and misinformation.

== Published works ==
- 1999 L'étau. L'Afrique dans un monde sans frontières. Babel Actes Sud.
- 2002 Le Viol de l'Imaginaire. Fayard/Actes Sud.
- 2005 Lettre au Président des Français à propos de la Côte d'Ivoire et de l'Afrique en général. Fayard.
- 2008 L'Afrique humiliée. Fayard.
- 2012 L'Afrique mutilée. Taama Editions.

== Awards ==
- 1995 – Ciwara Prize of Excellence
- 1996 – Knight of the National Order of Mali
- 2004 – Prince Claus Cultural Award (Netherlands)
- 2006 – Official of the National Order of Mali
- 2008 – Commentator of the National Order of Mali
