= World Trade Organization Ministerial Conference of 2022 =

WTO trade conference in Geneva, Switzerland

Twelfth Ministerial Conference of the World Trade Organization

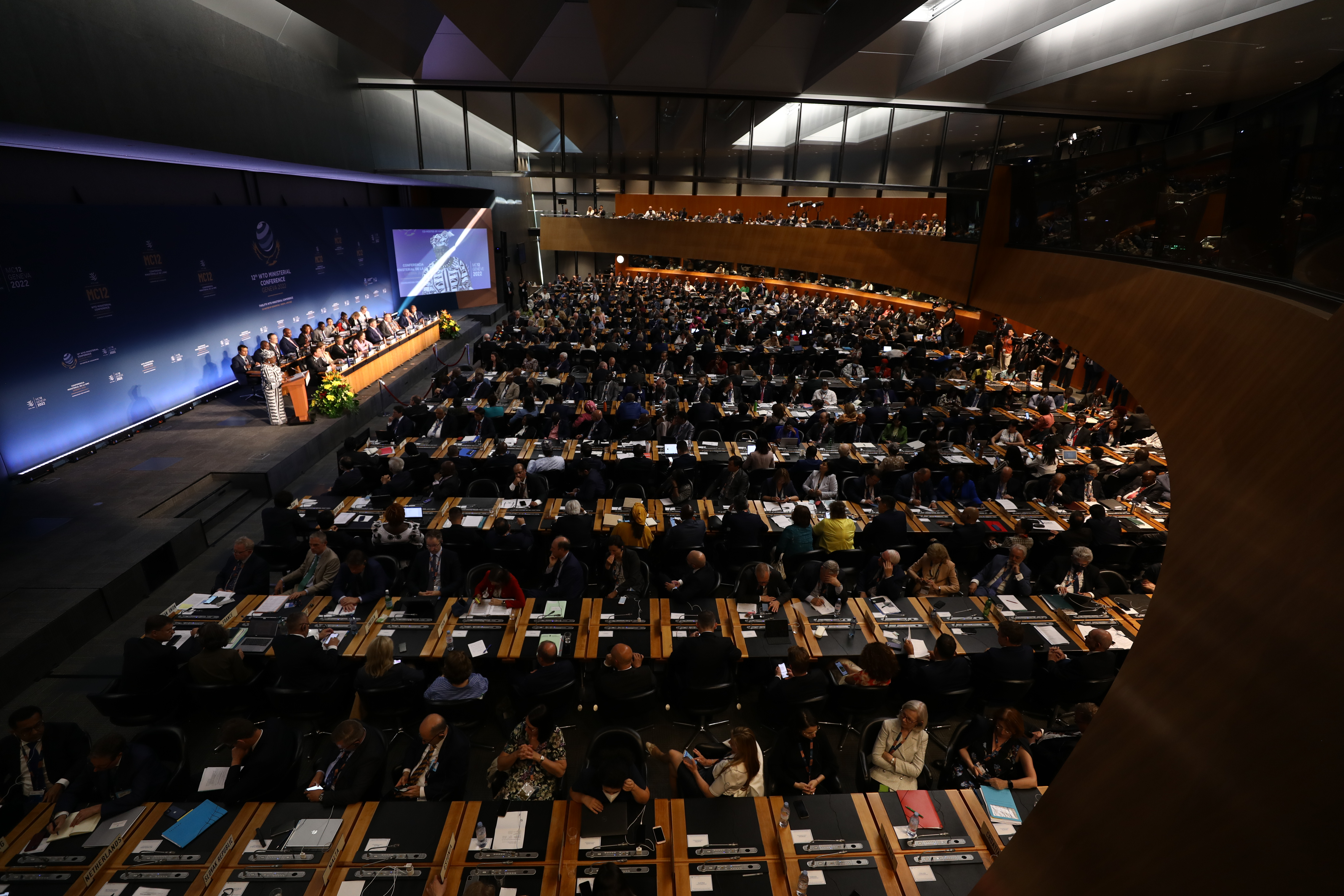
- Country: Geneva, Switzerland
- Previous event: Eleventh Ministerial Conference of the World Trade Organization
- Next event: Thirteenth Ministerial Conference of the World Trade Organization
- Participants: 164 member countries

The Twelfth Ministerial Conference (MC12) of the World Trade Organization (WTO) was a landmark event, marking the first Ministerial Conference held in nearly five years due to the COVID-19 pandemic. It brought together trade ministers and senior officials from all 164 WTO member countries to discuss and negotiate critical global trade issues.

== Background ==
- Originally scheduled for June 2020 in Kazakhstan, MC12 was postponed due to the pandemic's travel restrictions and economic disruptions.
- In April 2021, a rescheduled conference in Geneva was again postponed due to a new COVID-19 variant.
- Finally, in April 2022, WTO members confirmed MC12 would take place in Geneva, marking a crucial step towards reviving international trade dialogue.

== Key Areas of Discussion ==
- WTO Response to the COVID-19 Pandemic: Members adopted a Ministerial Declaration on the WTO's response, including a temporary waiver of certain intellectual property rights for COVID-19 vaccine production. This aimed to accelerate vaccine production and access, particularly in developing countries.
- Fisheries Subsidies Negotiations: After years of negotiations, MC12 delivered a historic agreement to prohibit harmful fisheries subsidies that contribute to overfishing and illegal, unreported, and unregulated (IUU) fishing. This decision was seen as a significant step towards promoting sustainable fishing practices and protecting marine resources.
- Agriculture Issues: Discussions focused on public stockholding for food security, aiming to balance the needs of developing countries to maintain adequate food reserves with concerns about potential trade distortions.
- WTO Reform: Members engaged in discussions on how to improve the WTO's effectiveness and efficiency in addressing contemporary trade challenges. This included discussions on streamlining dispute settlement mechanisms and enhancing the organization's responsiveness to evolving needs.
- Moratorium on Customs Duties on Electronic Transmissions: Members reaffirmed their commitment to the existing moratorium on customs duties on electronic transmissions, promoting continued growth in the digital economy.

== Outcomes ==
- MC12 was widely considered a success for the WTO, demonstrating its ability to deliver concrete outcomes on critical issues despite challenging circumstances.
- The agreements on fisheries subsidies, the WTO's response to the pandemic, and food security were seen as particularly significant advancements in addressing global challenges.
- MC12 re-energized multilateral trade discussions and paved the way for further progress on various trade issues.

== Additional Information ==
- MC12 was co-hosted by Kazakhstan and chaired by Mr. Timur Suleimenov, Deputy Chief of Staff of Kazakhstan's president.
- The conference served as a crucial platform for fostering international cooperation and advancing the global trade agenda in a post-pandemic world.
