= Riccardo Petrella =

Italian political scientist and economist (born 1941)

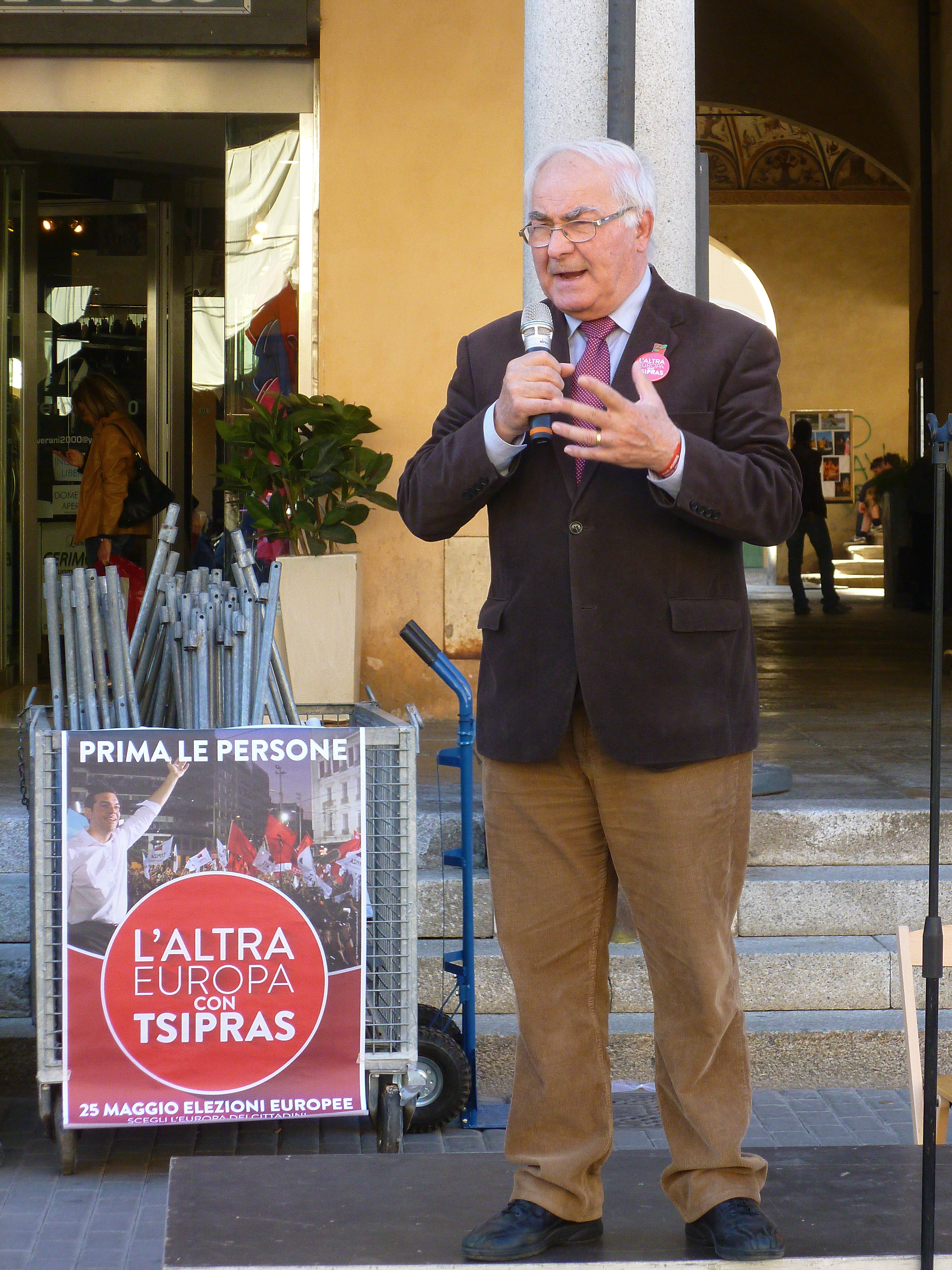
- Born: August 5, 1941 (age 85); La Spezia

Academic background
- Education: University of Florence

Academic work
- Discipline: Political science, economics
- Institutions: University of Louvain

Riccardo Petrella (born on 5 August 1941 in La Spezia) is an Italian political scientist and economist; he has a doctorate in political sciences from the University of Florence). Currently professor emeritus at the University of Louvain, he participates in a tradition that unites Christianity, personalism and solidarity principles. In 1991, he founded the Lisbon Group, which was composed of 21 academic, business, media and cultural decision-makers, so as to enhance the critical analyses of the current globalization. He is also a member of the World Social Forum and the Porto Alegre Manifesto.

== Biography ==
Petrella was nominated doctor honoris causa at the University of Umeå, University of Roskilde, Catholic University Brussels, the University of Mons, the Polytechnical Institute of Grenoble and the University of Québec in Montréal. He worked as a scientific secretary during the years 1967 to 1975, then he became Director of the European Centre for research coordination in Social Sciences in Vienna (Austria). From 1976 to 1978, he was a senior researcher in the International Council of Social Sciences in Paris (France) and also a fellow of the Ford Foundation He led the FAST programme (Forecasting and Assessment in Science and Technology) in the European Commission in the time frame December 1978 – 1994. From 1982 onwards he has been working as a visiting professor and afterwards as a full professor in economics at the University of Louvain, where he taught particularly global economics. Since 2006 he attained the status of professor emeritus. He was also visiting professor at the [VUB Free University of Brussels] from 1999 till 2005, and lectured on human ecology at the Accademia di Architettura de Mendrisio (CH). In 1991, he established the Lisbon Group. He established the International Committee for a global water contract in 1997 (of which he is the general secretary). Starting 2003, he took the initiative to set up the University of the Public Good, of which the experimental works took off in Italy (water Faculty) and in Belgium (Faculty of the conversion).

== Publications ==
- La renaissance des cultures régionales en Europe, 1978
- The Limits to Competition, 1993
- Le bien commun : éloge de la solidarité, édition Labor, coll. « Quartier libre », 1996
- L'eau : res publica ou marchandise ? (2003)
- The Water Manifesto, 1998
- Désir d'humanité : le droit de rêver, 2004
- Pour une nouvelle narration du monde, 2007
- In the name of Humanity, 2015

Most of his books have been published in several languages.
