= Sally Burch =

British-Ecuadorian Internet activist

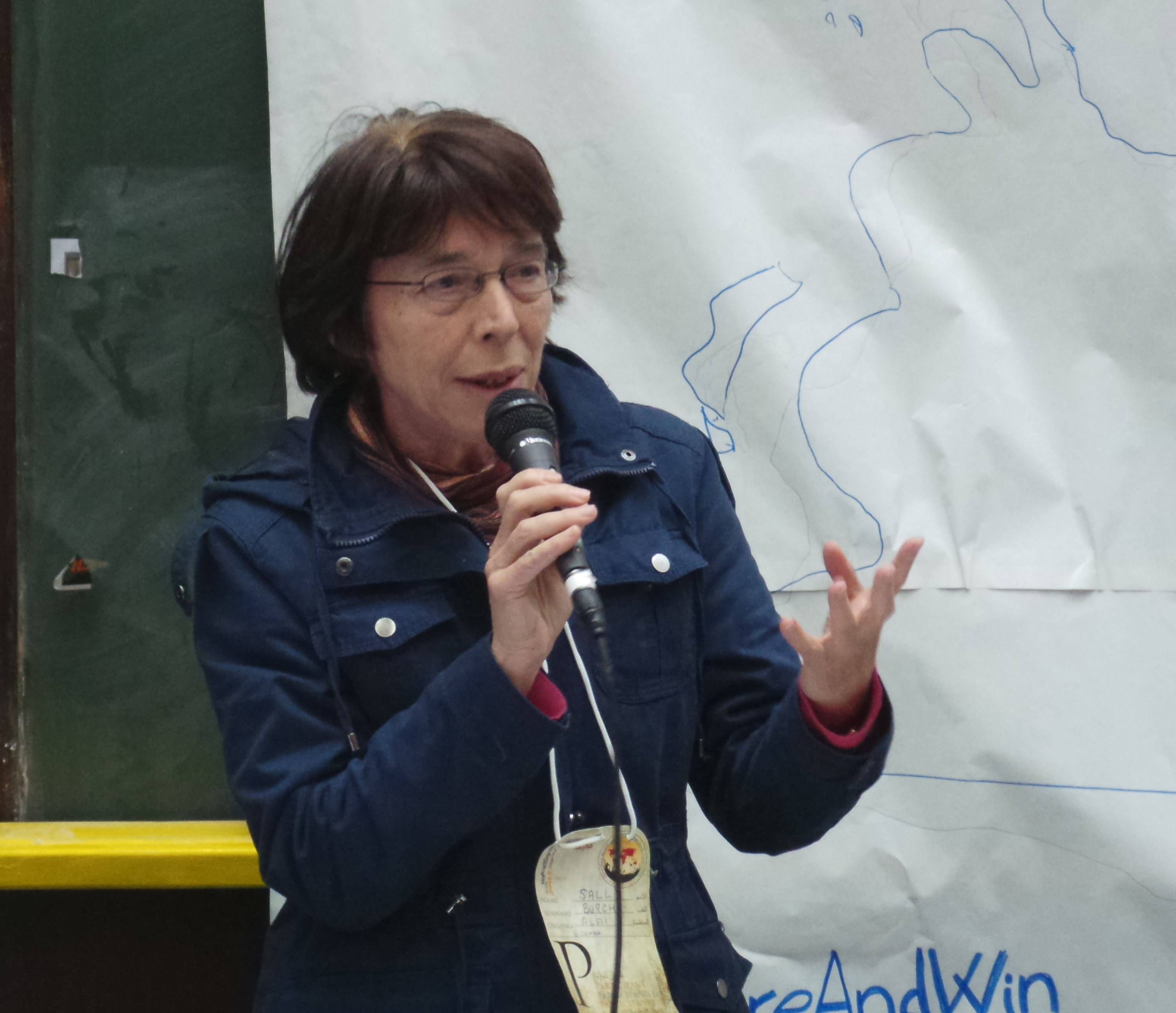
- Born: 1949 (age 76–77); London, UK
- Education: University of Warwick & Concordia University
- Occupations: journalist, activist

Sally Burch (born 1949) is a British-Ecuadorian journalist and communication rights activist, executive director of the Agencia Latinoamericana de Información and a member of the coordinating group of the Internet Social Forum.

== Life ==
Burch was born in 1949 in London. She has a degree in literature from the University of Warwick and a diploma in journalism from Concordia University in Montreal. While studying journalism in Canada, she was a co-founder in 1977 of the Latin American Information Agency (ALAI) which denounced the then Latin American dictatorships.

An activist for women's rights and communication rights from 1975 to 1983 while residing in Canada, in 1983 she moved to Ecuador. Between 1990 and 1993 she was responsible for the creation of the Ecuadorian network "Ecuanex", a non-profit electronic communication corporation that in 1990 constituted a network aimed at disseminating access to new Information and Communication Technologies (ICTs) to increase Ecuador's development.

From 1993 to 1995, she was the global coordinator of the Global Program to Support Women's Networks for the Association for Progressive Communications, a pioneering initiative to encourage women to use the Internet as part of the World Conference for Women in Beijing which was held in 1996. A noted feature was the use of an "Information Super Highway" website; the conference boasted its own internet server and over 130,000 hits. Burch discussed the nature of cyberspace, "where common interest groups gather to exchange information".

Between 2002 and 2003, she directed the "Working Group on Contents and Themes" of the World Summit on the Information Society that took place in Geneva and from 2001 to 2003, she was Coordinator of the Civil Society Working Group on Contents and Themes of the World Summit on the Information Society, organized by the United Nations.

Burch has written concerning media corporations and championing the right of citizens to information and to communication and on the citizens' internet. She is a member of the coordinating group of the Internet Social Forum and in September 2017 she led the Dialogues for a Citizens' Internet NuestrAmérica towards the Internet Social Forum, held in Quito.

== Deportation from Argentina ==
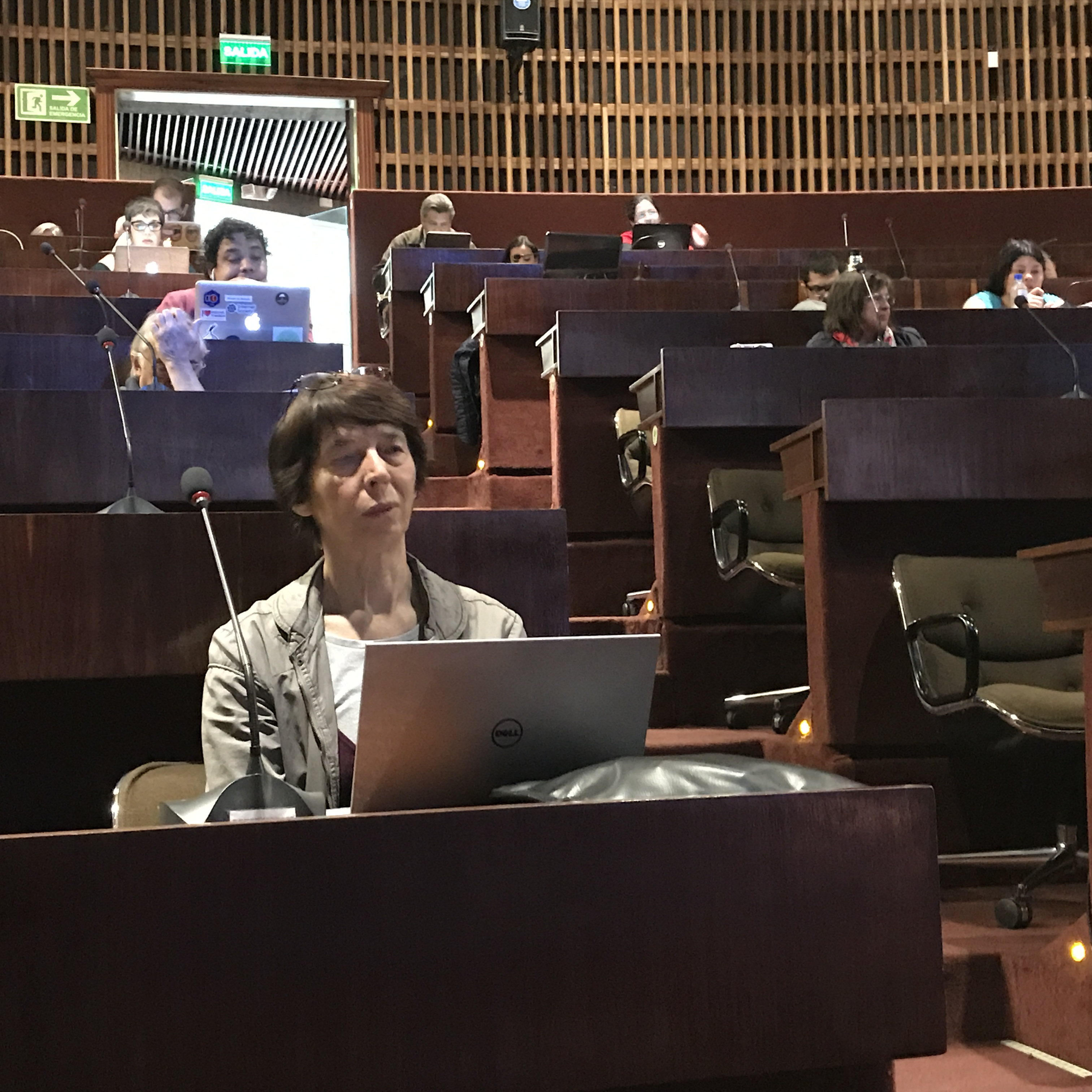
Burch at an international meeting on the Citizens' Internet in Quito in 2017

On 8 December 2017, Burch traveled to Argentina to cover the Ministerial Conference of the World Trade Organization (WTO) and other forums in Buenos Aires as the executive director of the Latin American Information Agency. The government said that she was on a list of over 60 people who were not welcome in Argentina. Officials prevented her from entering Argentina because she would be "disruptive" and she was deported back to Ecuador where she lives. The head of Attac Norway, Petter Titland was also deported to Brazil on the grounds that his actions would also be disruptive.

The Ecuadorian Foreign Ministry issued a statement in which it "regrets the decision of the Argentine immigration authorities to deport the Anglo-Ecuadorian citizen Sally Burch, executive director of the Latin American Information Agency."
