= World Trade Organization Ministerial Conference of 2017 =

Annual event in December 2017 in Argentina

Eleventh Ministerial Conference of the World Trade Organization

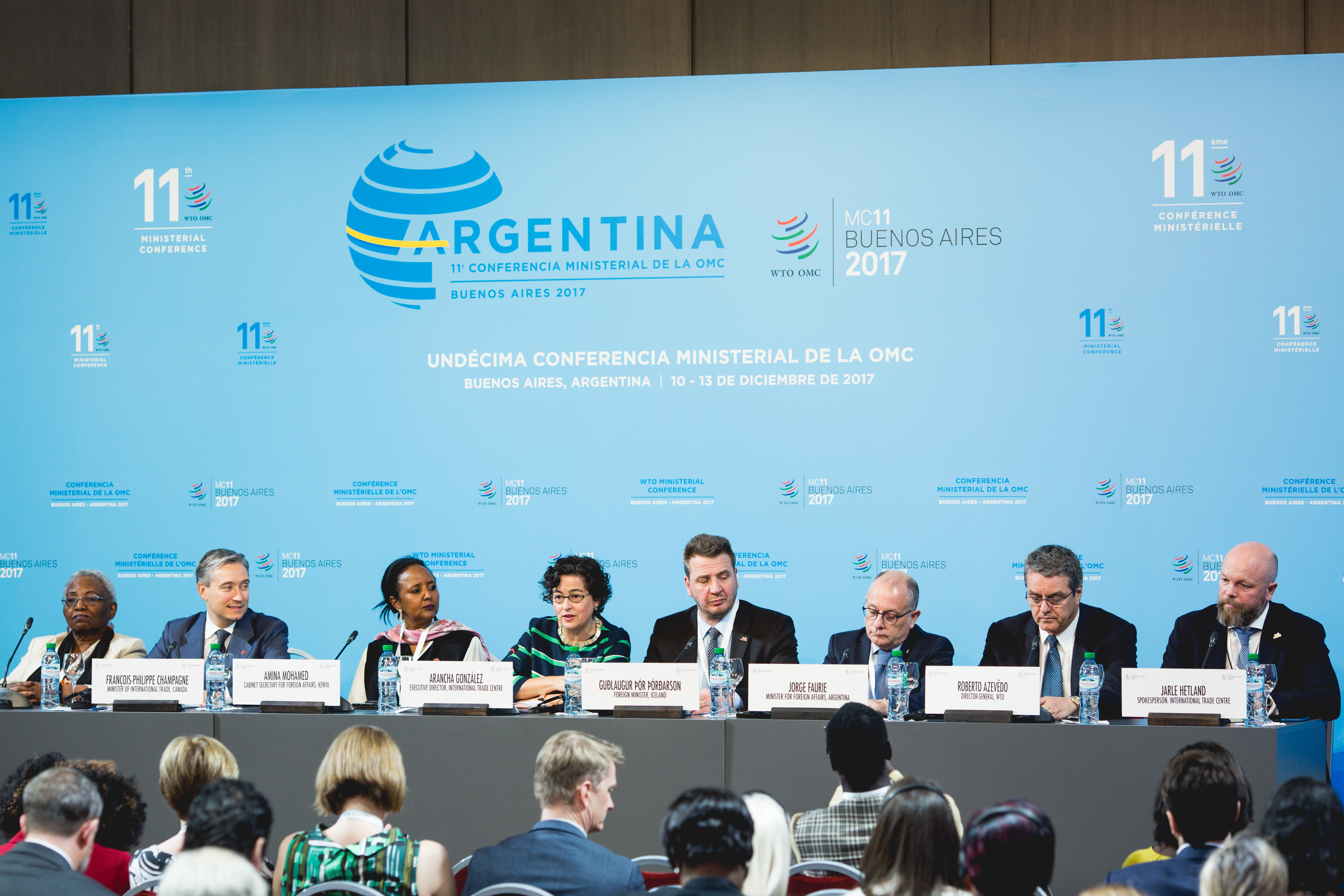
- Begins: 11 December 2017
- Ends: 13 December 2017
- Country: Buenos Aires, Argentina
- Previous event: Tenth Ministerial Conference of the World Trade Organization
- Next event: Twelfth Ministerial Conference of the World Trade Organization
- Participants: World Trade Organization member countries

The 11th World Trade Organization Ministerial Conference was held in Buenos Aires, Argentina, from 11 to 13 December 2017. It was chaired by Minister Susana Malcorra of Argentina. The Conference ended with a number of ministerial decisions, including on fisheries subsidies and e-commerce duties, and a commitment to continue negotiations in all areas. The conference also led to the formation of working party to enable faster induction of South Sudan in the WTO.

== Security ==
The Argentine government prevented journalist Sally Burch from entering Argentina and she was deported to Ecuador where she lives. The head of Attac Norway, Petter Titland was also deported to Brazil on the grounds that his actions would also be disruptive.
