= Information Technology Agreement =

Treaty enforced by the World Trade Organization

- Information Technology Agreement parties
- Signed: 13 December 1996
- Effective: 1 July 1997
- Depositary: World Trade Organization

The Information Technology Agreement (ITA) is a plurilateral agreement enforced by the World Trade Organization (WTO) and concluded at the WTO's Singapore Ministerial Conference in 1996. The agreement was set out in the Ministerial Declaration on Trade in Information Technology Products issued at the conference, and entered into force 1 July 1997. The declaration referred to "the key role of trade in information technology products in the development of information industries and in the dynamic expansion of the world economy".

Since 1997, a formal Committee under the WTO watches over the following of the Declaration and its Implementations. The aim of the treaty is to lower all taxes and tariffs on information technology products by signatories to zero.

The agreement was expanded at the Nairobi Ministerial Conference in 2015. According to a 2017 study in the World Trade Review, the 2015 ITA expansion was "the most successful attempt at trade liberalization under the auspices of the WTO since its inception in 1995". The study attributes the success of the negotiations to four factors: "a narrower scope without a single undertaking approach, a negotiating group that contained many but not all WTO members, a focus on tariffs rather than non-tariff barriers, and avoiding a nationalistic opposition".
