= Internet Social Forum =

Organization

The Internet Social Forum emerged from the World Social Forum (WSF) as a means to envision the role of the internet in help shape a new world on broadly similar lines to the WSF. It was founded in March 2015 at the Tunis WSF Conference.

Leading voices in its creation were Africa - Alex Gakaru, Asia - Rishab Bailey, Europe - Norbert Bollow, North America - Michael Gurstein and in South America - Sally Burch.

== Four demands ==
Four demands were included in the Tunis Call for a People's Internet:

- "Decisive action to curb the indiscriminate mass surveillance being implemented by corporations, security agencies and governments."
- "Decentralization --to the greatest extent possible-- of the Internet's technical, data and economic structures; and access to a net-neutral Internet, as a right, which would include support for community-owned networks and public infrastructure. We also defend the freedom of people-to-people communication."
- "Harnessing the Internet revolution to build global solidarity among people's movements, and enable them to share their experiences globally and learn from one another."
- "A people's Internet must be driven first and foremost by the people. An Internet driven by big business, hand-in-hand with big government does not represent the public interest. We will defend the right of grassroots organizations and social movements, alongside other civil society actors, to have a seat at any global negotiations on the governance of the Internet."
