= Emir Sader =

Brazilian sociologist

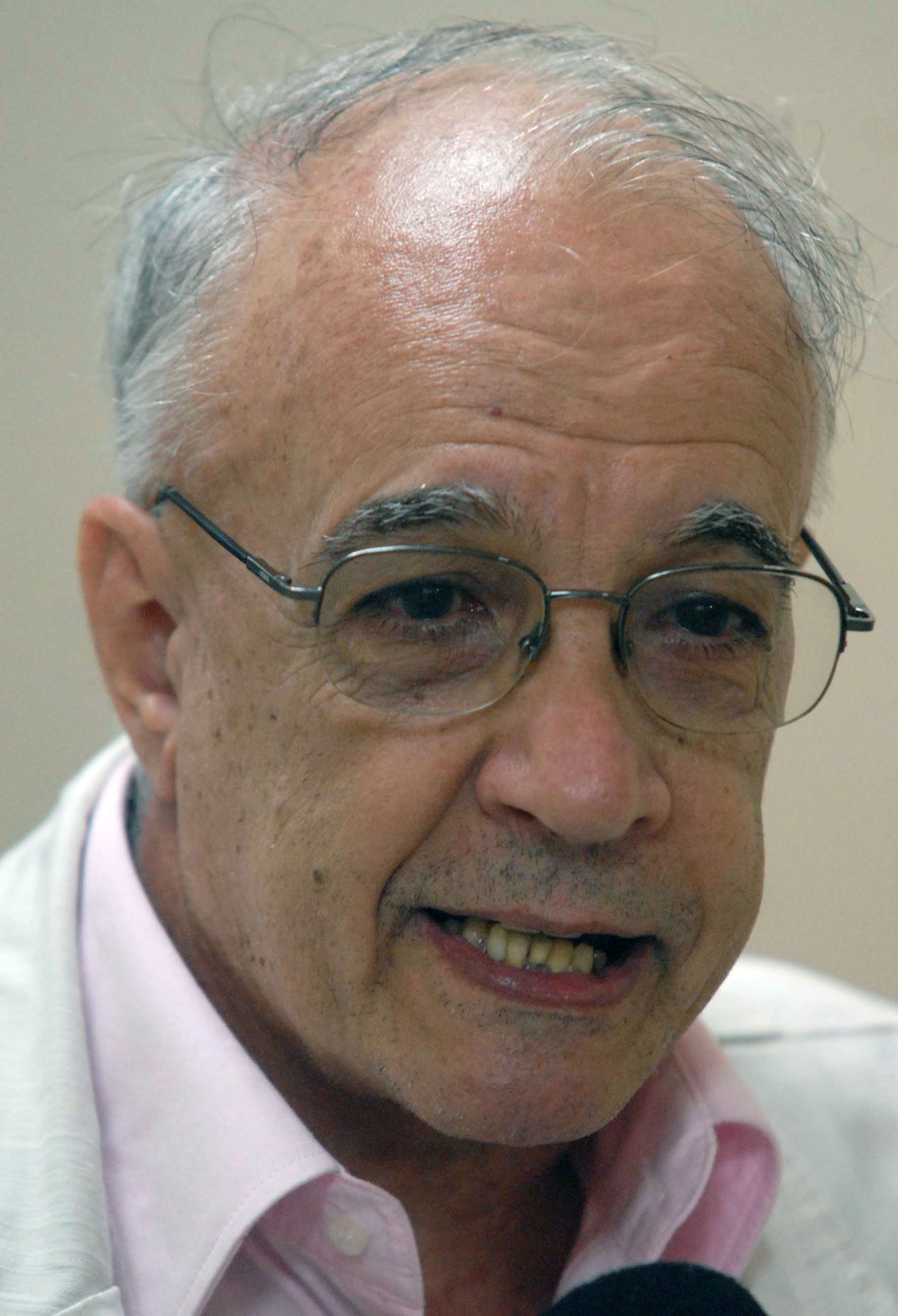
- Born: July 13, 1943 (age 83)

Academic background
- Education: University of São Paulo

Academic work
- Discipline: Sociologist, politician scientist

Emir Simão Sader (born July 13, 1943) is a Brazilian sociologist and political scientist of Lebanese origin.

== Biography ==
Sader received all his higher education credentials from the University of São Paulo. He did his bachelor's degree in philosophy, his master's degree in political philosophy and his doctoral degree in political science. He also worked at the University of São Paulo as a professor of philosophy and later of political science. He also worked as a professor of political science at University of Campinas in Brazil and as a researcher at the Center for Socioeconomic Studies at the University of Chile. After his retirement from the University of São Paulo, he joined the State University of Rio de Janeiro as director of the Public Policies Laboratory (LPP). He currently teaches Sociology at the State University of Rio de Janeiro and serves as the executive secretary of the Latin American Council of Social Sciences

Known to be a Marxist thinker, Sader has worked with national and foreign publications. He was a member of the editorial board of the New Left Review, a 160-page journal published every two months from London that examines world politics; the global economy, state powers and protest movements; contemporary social theory, history and philosophy; cinema, literature, heterodox art and aesthetics. NLR is also published in Spanish. Sader's contributions to the NLR include The Worker's Party in Brazil (1987); Beyond Civil Society (2002); Taking Lula's Measure (2005); and The Weakest Link? Neoliberalism in Latin America (2008).

Between 1997 and 1999, Sader chaired the Latin American Sociological Association (LASA), the largest professional association in the world for individuals and institutions engaged in the study of Latin America. Sader was also one of the World Social Forum organizers (WSF). First held in Brazil, the WSF is an annual meeting of civil society organizations. One of the main goals behind organizing the WSF is an effort to develop an alternative future through the championing of counter-hegemonic globalization . Nonetheless, Sader grew more critical of the WSF for their exclusion of political parties. He believed that in confining themselves to the social sphere, the WSF is "unable to create the instruments needed to fight political hegemony."

In 2005 Sader published an article on the website of the news agency Carta Maior in response to a statement made by Senator Jorge Bornhausen. Representing the PFL, Liberal Front Party (renamed to Democrats), the senator was asked if he was unhappy with the political crisis of corruption facing Brazil then. He responded that he was happy because "we would be free from this race for the next 30 years," in reference to politicians from the Worker's Party, President Lula's party. Sader's article accuses Santa Catarina state's Senator Jorge Bornhausen of being elitist, bourgeois, fascist and racist. Reacting against the article, Bornhausen filed a criminal defamation lawsuit against the professor, based on the defamation provisions of the 1967 Press Law. In October 2006 Sader was sentenced to one year of prison and to dismissal from his position as a professor with the University of Rio de Janeiro. Following those events intellectuals headed by Antônio Cândido circulated a petition in support of Sader and condemning the sentence . According to the manifesto, the judicial decision goes against freedom of expression, inhibiting and criminalizing "critical thinking", and "university autonomy ." Due to compulsory legal provisions, the prison sentence was converted to community service for 8 hours a week for the same period.

In 2011, Sader was nominated for the presidency of the Casa de Rui Barbosa Foundation. The foundation is a federal public institution, linked to the ministry of culture, founded to promote intellectual work and to preserve national memory. After his nomination, Sader was critical of Ana Buarque de Hollanda, the minister of culture with Folha de S. Paulo newspaper, because of her silence in reaction to the budget cuts imposed on the ministry of culture. Some believe that Sader's criticisms played a part in the abortion of his nomination.

Sader's experience is mainly in the area of political science, with emphasis on state and government. His work mainly focuses on the following: Brazil, Lula, Latin America, and politics. He is the author of The Revenge of History and The New Mole among others.

== Selected publications ==
Among Sader's publications in English are;

- The Workers' Party in Brazil, New Left Review, 93,102 (1987)
- Without fear of being happy: Lula, the Workers Party and Brazil, Verso Books (1991), ISBN 9780860915232
- Beyond civil society, New Left Review, 17, 87 (2002)
- Taking Lula's measure, New Left Review, 33, 59. (2005)
- The Weakest Link? Neoliberalism in Latin America, New Left Review, 5, 31 (2008)
- The new mole: Paths of the Latin American left, Verso Books (2011), ISBN 9781844676927
