= Global Justice =

Global Justice may refer to:

- Global justice, a concept
- Global Justice (Kim Possible), a fictional organization
- Global justice movement
- Global Justice (organization)
