= Global Action for Children =

Global Action For Children
- Founded: September 2004 - December 2010

Global Action for Children (GAC) was a highly effective nonpartisan coalition dedicated to improving the lives of orphans and vulnerable children in the developing world active from 2004 - 2010.

GAC's mission was to increase funding in the US foreign assistance budget and ensure it was spent effectively so children living in adversity have the healthcare, education, food, community support they need to grow up safe and healthy. In fall of 2006 The Jolie-Pitt Foundation recognized GAC's work with a $1M grant and Angelina Jolie served as Honorary Board Chair. GAC was supported by The Jolie-Pitt Foundation, The Gates Foundation, FXB International and other donors.

GAC Leadership Council Included: Africa Faith and Justice Network, American Jewish World Service, Center for Health and Gender Equity, The Children's Project, Church Women United, Church World Service, Episcopal Church USA, Lutheran Church of America, FXB International, Global AIDS Alliance, Global Justice, Hope for African Children Initiative, Keep a Child Alive, Mothers Acting Up, Progressive National Baptist Convention, Religious Action Center of Reformed Judaism, RESULTS, Save Africa's Children, Student Global AIDS Campaign, Student Campaign fort Child Survival, United Methodist Church General Board of Church and Society

GAC's unique strength was derived from the effectiveness and diversity of the charitable, faith-based, nongovernmental, and student organizations that comprise its Leadership Council, and the ability to mobilize a broad range of constituencies.

GAC was a nonpartisan, independent voice for children that did not accept any U.S. government funding. That independence allowed GAC to adhere to its mission, avoid advocating out of self-interest, and take bold action on issues affecting children without fear of financial repercussions. Many in the child health community looked to GAC to be a strong, independent voice.

GAC areas of focus: securing support of the international community for children who had lost one or more parents or were made vulnerable due to AIDS, TB, Malaria, conflict, or natural disaster. Additional areas of focus were universal basic education, keeping children with family and community (community care), early childhood development, child survival and immunizations, supporting children in conflict, gender equity, and prevention of child marriage and child sexual abuse.

Jennifer Delaney led GAC from September 2004 - October 2009. Kathleen Guy served as executive director from October 2009 – 2010.

While Global Action for Children ceased operations in December 2010, GAC's work on behalf of OVC continues to impact the lives of millions of children around the globe. GAC's leadership in securing a 10% of The President's Emergency Plan for AIDS Relief (PEPFAR) for OVCs and the passage The Assistance for Orphans and Vulnerable Children Act of 2005 leaves a legacy of billions of dollars in US Foreign Assistance for vulnerable children and their families in developing countries, and a framework on how the funding should be spent to most effectively serve that population. First authorized in 2003, the program has been reauthorized three times: in 2008, 2013, and most recently in December 2018. PEPFAR has provided care for more than 6.3 million orphans and vulnerable children (OVC).

Advocacy Strategy

- Global Action for Children worked to improve policies and increase funding for orphans and vulnerable children (OVC) in developing countries.
- Policy outreach - GAC collected and analyzed information about the issues that affected orphans and vulnerable children from partners in the field. The findings were taken to policymakers to persuade them to allocate funds for programs that protect the world's children.
- Media outreach - GAC educated media on the OVC crisis and placed op-eds national media outlets to influence members of Congress. GAC also engaged their constituents in key districts to work with local media to improve coverage of the OVC crisis.
- Coalition building - GAC frequently convened diverse groups of NGOs, technical advisors, academics, government officials and service provider to improve programing for orphans and vulnerable children in developing countries.
- Grassroots and Grasstops mobilization - GAC engaged in a wide variety of political strategies: training constituents in important congressional districts, National Press outreach from a wide variety of stakeholders, leveraging the influence GAC honorary Chairperson Angelina Jolie, and other influential supporters for public and back channel advocacy.

Timeline

2003

- Future partners of GAC worked together to get an earmark of 10% of U.S. global AIDS funding for the care and support of orphans and vulnerable children within U.S. Leadership against HIV/AIDS, Tuberculosis, and Malaria Act of 2003
- Founded as a coalition of nongovernmental, faith-based, and student organizations to lobby members of Congress

2004

- Assistance for Orphans and Other Vulnerable Children in Developing Countries Act (PL-109-95) introduced, the result of GAC and Congressional allies working together

2005

- Assistance for Orphans and Other Vulnerable Children in Developing Countries Act (PL-109-95) legislation signed into law November 8, 2005 by President Bush

2006

- Jolie-Pitt Foundation recognized GACs advocacy work by contributing $1 million, along with other commitments from FXB International, and other donors
- GAC led more than 30 stakeholders including academics, technical experts and NGO partners in creating Civil Society Recommendations for the Implementation of PL-109-95

2007

- GAC and UNICEF held a summit in Brussels on establishing an AIDS Free Generation network
- GAC office became an independent 501c3 and officially launched as an organization
- GAC influenced the Bush Administration's appeal to Congress to increase the funding of PEPFAR from $15 million to $30 million, with 10 percent allocated to orphan care.
- GAC and UNICEF's Unite for Children Unite Against AIDS campaign published the AIDS Free Generation strategy report
- GAC successfully co-leads AIDS Free Generation advocacy efforts to lobby UNAIDS to broaden the definition of vulnerable child so that more children received wrap around services.
- GAC convinces Pastor Rick Warren of the Saddleback Church to ask then Candidate Barack Obama about his commitment to helping the world most vulnerable children in a televised presidential discussion

2008

- Bill and Melinda Gates Foundation made its first grant to GAC and The Jolie-Pitt Foundation, FXB International, and other donors committed a second series of funding to GAC
- GAC convened a series of meetings with Civil Society including NGO's, technical experts and academics and USG officials to provide input on improving policies and program for OVCs
- GAC led advocacy efforts for the reauthorization of the 10% earmark for OVC in the U.S. Leadership against HIV/AIDS, Tuberculosis, and Malaria Act of 2003
- GAC held "Children's Champion's Awards at the Newseum Honoring Sens. Richard Lugar (R-IN), Chris Dodd (D-CT), Barbara Boxer (D-CA) with Dr. Jim Kim of FXB Center for Health and Human Rights at Harvard University as the keynote speaker.
- GAC named one of the best run charities in the Washington DC are by The Catalogue of Philanthropy for Greater Washington DC

2009

- Founding Executive Director Jennifer Delaney resigned to care for a critically ill family member
- Kathleen Guy announced as Executive Director

2010

- GAC dissolves at the end of the year

External links

Angelina Jolie calls for more Funding for Orphans

GAC Annual Report 2008

GAC Launch, Washington Press Club
