= Hans-Joachim Niemann =

German philosopher (born 1941)

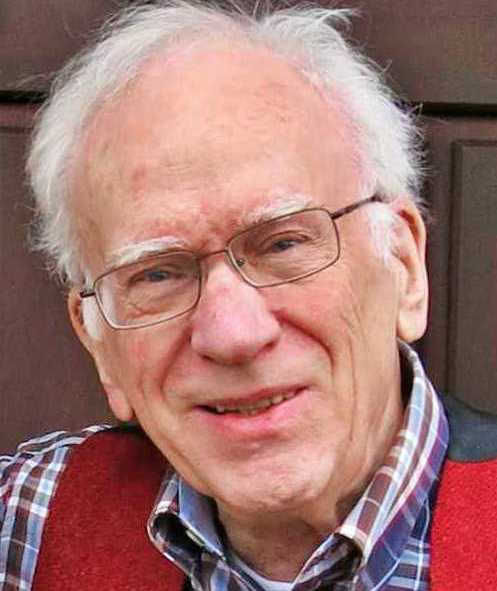
Hans-Joachim Niemann, 2020, 79 years old

Hans-Joachim Niemann (born 26 April 1941 in Kiel) is a German philosopher and PhD chemist, who has become known especially as a translator and editor of works by Karl Popper, including first editions and first translations. As a scholarly writer, he first published scientific papers, then many essays and several books on Karl Popper's philosophy and Critical Rationalism, including a 400-page Lexicon of Critical Rationalism. His Popper studies helped to establish Karl Popper as a major ethicist and as an important biophilosopher.

== Life ==
Niemann studied from 1962 to 1964 at Kiel University, LMU Munich, and Marburg University Philosophy and Physics. In 1965, he began studying Chemistry at the University of Tübingen and graduated in 1972 with the Dr. rer. nat. degree. He then researched and published on light-induced chemical reactions. Based on the knowledge acquired in the process, he became head of the unit for uranium enrichment using laser light (uranium laser isotope separation) at Kraftwerk Union, a joint subsidiary of Siemens and AEG. As inventor and co-inventor, he was granted about thirty domestic and foreign patents.

In 1984, Niemann switched from technology and natural science to philosophy. Since 1991, now in his sixth decade, he has published five books and more than a hundred essays on Critical Rationalism and translated books and writings of Karl Popper into German.

This was preceded by studies (1984–1990, partly private, partly at the University of Erlangen) of Analytic Philosophy and Critical Rationalism. He then became an assistant lecturer at the University of Bamberg (1993–1999), where he taught Vienna Circle, Critical Rationalism (Karl Popper, Hans Albert) and Popper's critics (Thomas Kuhn, Paul Feyerabend, Imre Lakatos), as well as the ethics of Bertrand Russell, John Leslie Mackie and Hans Jonas. During the summer semester of 1994, he gave a guest lecture on Rational Decision Making at the University of Passau.

During a visit to Kenley/UK, Niemann met Karl Popper personally in February 1994. His correspondence with Popper (1991–1994) is documented in the Karl-Popper-Archive and accessible in ResearchGate. Popper judged his work kindly. About his 1992 book manuscript Vernunft als Wille zur Problemlösung (Reason as the Will to Solve Problems) Popper wrote: "It seems to me excellent; and I wish to congratulate you heartily on it... fundamentally everything you have to say seems to me excellent – hitting the nail on the head – and not accidental! (Also, it is all very original.)" Popper also praised Niemann's simple and unpretentious style.

Popper biographer Friedel Weinert sees Niemann, along with David Miller, Jeremy Shearmur, and Hans Albert, among the few who currently continue Critical Rationalism. Reinhard Neck calls Niemann "one of the most active writers and researchers in the field of critical rationalism."

Niemann is co-founder of the Society for Critical Philosophy Nuremberg.He lives in Poxdorf near Erlangen (Germany).

=== Interviews ===
- Erlanger Tagblatt, Saturday 23. 8. 2008, section Erlangen, page 5, (Univ.-Bibliothek Erlangen: H05/Film.Z 120).
- Giuseppe Franco, Ethik und Alltagsdenken. Ein Gespräch mit Hans-Joachim Niemann über den Kritischen Rationalismus, Part 1: Aufklärung und Kritik 1 (2009), pp. 152–170. Part 2: Aufklärung und Kritik 2 (2009), pp. 107–123. Both parts in: G. Franco (ed.), Dem Anderen Recht geben, Klagenfurt-Vienna: kitab 2010, pp. 110–165.

== Research ==
=== Popper as a major ethicist ===
Karl Popper did not write a book on ethics. Niemann proved, based on archival material and many essays scattered throughout Popper's writings, that he, contrary to his reputation, was an important ethical theorist who advocated three major ethical concepts: (1) Negative Utilitarianism, i.e., avoiding concrete suffering instead of striving for indefinable happiness. (2) Epistemological ethics, i.e., first solve the factual problems associated with any ethical problem in order to avoid discussions about values as much as possible. And (3) problem-oriented ethics, i.e., treating values, moral laws, and principles of action as objective attempts to solve problems.

Niemann has also summarized and commented on Popper's moral philosophy from many of his scattered contributions. He counts Popper among the great moral philosophers.

=== Popper as an important biophilosopher ===
In 2012–2022, Niemann worked out another lesser known side of Popper: Karl Popper as a major biophilosopher. He showed this in his English written book Karl Popper and the Two New Secrets of Life (Niemann (2014)) and in many papers in which he refers to and comments on Popper's biological work. In these studies, Niemann draws not only on Popper's previously known work, but also on seven German first publications translated and edited by him as well as on new archival material from which he edited and published for the first time four of Popper's English writings concerning biology.

=== The first edition of Popper's Medawar Lecture ===
Niemann's work was well received, even by biologists, especially the above-mentioned 2014 published book in which Popper's long kept closed First Medawar Lecture 1986 is reprinted. Popper had delivered the lecture titled A New Interpretation of Darwinism to the Royal Society in the presence of four Nobel laureates. It had caused a great stir at that time, partly because one of the Nobel laureates, Max Perutz, got into an argument with Popper after the lecture about whether or not biochemical and biological processes could be explained in purely chemical-physical terms. Since Popper's lecture was not published at that time and was to remain locked as 'closed material' in the Popper-Archive until 2029, it was largely forgotten. In 2012, Niemann was able to get Popper's former assistant and heir to his copyrights, Melitta Mew, to allow him to publish it ahead of time: in 2013 appeared the German translation; in 2014 the original English version. For an account of the long road from Popper's 1986 Medawar Lecture to its publication, see Niemann (2014), pp. 58–62.

=== Popper and his improvement of the Modern Synthesis ===
Independently of Popper, some evolutionary biologists had begun to correct and reformulate Neo-Darwinism, but Popper's proposals are decades older The impact that the Medawar Lecture produced after its rediscovery in 2014 is described by Denis Noble, a pioneer of systems biology: He agrees with Popper that Darwinism is incomplete unless one includes the preferences of living things. Neither biology nor biochemistry could be understood in purely physical-chemical terms unless the goals of organisms and organs were used to explain them. "He [Popper] proposed a radical interpretation of Darwinism, essentially rejecting the Modern Synthesis, by proposing that organisms themselves are the source of the creative processes in evolution, not random mutations in DNA. Popper suggested Darwinism was not so much wrong, but seriously incomplete. He also stated that biochemistry (and so a fortiori physiology) could not be reduced to physics and chemistry. Many points made in the recent special issue of The Journal of Physiology were therefore made nearly 30 years ago."

Noble agrees with Niemann's view that Popper found a third way of evolutionary theory and quotes him in the motto of his article: "The story of how humans and all living things came into existence is told in two widely believed versions: the Book of Genesis and Darwin's Origin of Species. It was the philosopher Karl Popper who presented us with a third story, no less important."

=== Plea for Popper's World 3 ===
In several essays, Niemann argues for taking seriously Popper's world 3 philosophy, which had been devalued by many philosophers, including critical rationalists, as metaphysics or old-age philosophy. Using many of Popper's scattered World 3 works, as well as unpublished archival material and the two monographs on World 3 (both in Popper (2012)), he compiles 'The Chronology of a Lifelong Interest': showing that Popper had been working towards this World 3 theory since he was 18 years old. In Niemann (2019) the importance of this theory and its future potential is elaborated.

=== Popper's 'Theory of Knowledge' as a new philosophical discipline ===
In Popper's London lecture 'Towards an Evolutionary Theory of Knowledge' (1989)), the term "theory of knowledge" is used for the first time for something quite different from epistemology. Popper had elaborated it already earlier without calling it a "theory of knowledge", mainly in his works on World 3. Niemann showed that with this kind of theory of knowledge (in German 'Wissenstheorie') Popper has founded a new philosophical discipline. It is not about processes of cognition nor methods of cognition that are supposed to lead to the truest possible knowledge, but about (1) objective knowledge, which is objectified in myths, traditions, and books, and which in the course of evolution has become increasingly important for man, for his self-consciousness, and for the development of his personality. And it is (2) about whether plants and biological cells have knowledge in the non-subjective sense, stored digitally in DNA and analogously in the cell. Above all, however, Popper's new theory of knowledge is concerned with (3) whether linguistic world-3-knowledge preserved in books and other media has a reality of its own and obeys laws of its own, and whether it can act on man and on new ideas that come to his mind, thus enabling his transcendence. In this way, theory of knowledge means according to Popper two rather different things: (A) epistemology (in German Erkenntnistheorie) and (B) evolutionary theory of knowledge (in German Wissenstheorie).

=== Problem-Solving Ethics ===
Since 1993, Niemann developed from Popper's epistemological problem-solving scheme of 1937 a general problem-solving scheme that makes objective judgments possible everywhere in life, but especially in ethics and morality. Niemann considers, unlike Popper, an objectively decidable and even scientific ethics possible, which in the field of ethical values, social norms and ethical maxims and principles, like other sciences, can lead to verifiable and therefore generally accepted results.

=== Science seeks truth, technology seeks repeatability ===
In the field of critical-rational epistemology Niemann contributed to the solution of the so-called induction problem. He argues that while Popper is right with his dictum 'There is no such thing as certain knowledge', we can still be sure that no stone falls from the bottom to the top. Niemann's answer to this inner conflict is: Science seeks truth and erroneously relies on the principle of induction; while Technology seeks repeatability (to ensure security, and safety) and rightly relies on the constancy of nature.

==== A contribution to the correspondence theory of truth ====
Niemann analyzed Popper's and Alfred Tarski's concept of truth and their correspondence theory of truth. Truth as the linguistic correspondence with physical facts is ascertainable, but the actual correspondence between the linguistic world and the physical world is inexplicable. "The Aim of Science" (title of the 5th chapter in Popper's Objective Knowledge, Routledge 1979), can therefore not be the absolute truth as in Popper, but only, as in Hans Albert, the more accurate of several alternative theories.

=== The theory of possibility spaces ===
In Popper's 1988 theory of propensities in his book A World of Propensities (Thoemmes 1990) and in archival notes, possibility spaces were only hinted at and not elaborated on. These fragments and Popper's interpretation of biological evolution as a perpetual reoccupation of newly discovered possibility spaces served Niemann as a starting point for a theory of real possibility spaces.

== Publications ==
=== Books ===
- H.-J. Niemann, Die Strategie der Vernunft. Rationalität in Erkenntnis, Moral und Metaphysik (The Strategy of Reason. Rationality in cognition, morality, and metaphysics), Vieweg, Braunschweig-Wiesbaden 1993, series Wissenschaftstheorie, Band 38. ISBN 3-528-06522-2
- H.-J. Niemann, Lexikon des Kritischen Rationalismus (Lexicon of critical rationalism), Mohr Siebeck, Tübingen 2004, study edition 2006. ISBN 3-16-149158-0
- H.-J. Niemann, Die Strategie der Vernunft. Problemlösende Vernunft, rationale Metaphysik und Kritisch-Rationale Ethik (The strategy of reason. Problem-solving reason, rational metaphysics, and critical-rational ethics), enlarged 2nd edition of Niemann (1993) with three new appendices, Mohr Siebeck, Tübingen 2008. ISBN 978-3-16-149878-7
- H.-J. Niemann, Die Nutzenmaximierer. Der aufhaltsame Aufstieg des Vorteilsdenkens (The Utility Maximisers. The stoppable rise of selfishness), Mohr Siebeck, Tübingen 2011. ISBN 978-3-16-150856-1
- H.-J. Niemann, Karl Popper and the Two New Secrets of Life, Mohr Siebeck, Tübingen 2014, English in the original, ISBN 978-3-16-153207-8
- H.-J. Niemann, Fallende Groschen soll man nicht aufhalten (The dropping penny shall not be stopped), Amazon Kindle Publ. (hardcover and eBook) 2016. ISBN 978-1-5239-8418-3

=== Essays, lectures, book chapters, patents ===
According to ResearchGate (January 2023), Niemann has authored 83 journal articles and 27 book chapters, and he has filed 14 patents. His topics are mainly ethics, critical rationalism, philosophy of science, biophilosophy, Karl Popper, and Hans Albert. See also the ORCID directory 'Niemann'.

=== English first editions of Karl Popper writings ===
- Karl Popper, A New Interpretation of Darwinism. The First Medawar Lecture (1986), Niemann (2014), Appendix A, pp. 115–128.
- Karl Popper, Lamarckism and DNA (1973), Niemann (2014), Appendix B, pp. 130–131.
- Karl Popper, A World without Natural Selection but with Problem Solving, Niemann (2014), Appendix C, pp. 132–133.
- Karl Popper, Letter to a Friend (1989), concerning biological questions, Niemann (2014), Appendix D, pp. 134–138.

=== German first editions of Karl Popper books ===
Published by Mohr Siebeck (Tübingen), Niemann translated and edited six books of Karl Popper:

- Objective Knowledge (1972)
- Quantum Theory and the Schism in Physics (1982)
- Realism and the Aim of Science (1983)
- Knowledge and the Body-Mind Problem (1994)
- The Myth of the Framework (1994)
- A World of Propensities (1990)

See the corresponding German Wikipedia page.

He also translated and edited 22 essays and lectures of Karl Popper in German language: See the corresponding German Wikipedia page: Essays of Karl Popper.

=== Wikibooks (extensible by everyone) ===
- Hans Albert. A German study guide.
- Be reasonable! – A crash course on Critical rationalism (in German).
- Norbert Hoerster. A German study guide.

== Bibliography ==
List and abbreviations of works cited several times

- Franco (2019): Franco G. (ed.), Handbuch Karl Popper, Springer, Wiesbaden 2019.
- Niemann (1993): H.-J. Niemann, Die Strategie der Vernunft. Rationalität in Erkenntnis, Moral und Metaphysik (The strategy of reason. Rationality in cognition, morals, and metaphysics), Vieweg, Braunschweig-Wiesbaden 1993, Serie Wissenschaftstheorie, Vol. 38. ISBN 3-528-06522-2
- Niemann (2004): H.-J. Niemann, Lexikon des Kritischen Rationalismus, Mohr Siebeck, Tübingen 2004, study edition 2006. ISBN 978-3-16-149158-0
- Niemann (2008): H.-J. Niemann, Die Strategie der Vernunft. Problemlösende Vernunft, rationale Metaphysik und Kritisch-Rationale Ethik (The strategy of reason. Problem-solving reason, rational metaphysics and critical-rational ethics), enlarged 2nd edition of Niemann (1993) with three new appendices, Mohr Siebeck, Tübingen 2008. ISBN 978-3-16-149878-7
- Niemann (2014): H.-J. Niemann, Karl Popper and the Two New Secrets of Life, Mohr Siebeck, Tübingen 2014. ISBN 978-3-16-153207-8
- Niemann (2017): H.-J. Niemann, Über Wunder und Utopien – Eine Welt voller Möglichkeitsräume (On wonders and utopias – A world full of possibility spaces), Aufklärung und Kritik 3 (2017), pp. 7–38.
- Niemann (2019): H.-J. Niemann, Karl Poppers Spätwerk und seine Welt 3 (Karl Popper's late work and his world 3), in Franco (2019), pp. 101–118. doi:10.1007/978-3-658-16239-9_6
- Niemann (2020): H.-J. Niemann, Utopias, Wonders, and a World of Possibilities. A Short Introduction into the Theory of Possibilism, a revised translation of Niemann (2017), available in Researchgate, Preprint, doi:10.13140/RG.2.2.30300.62084
- Niemann (2022): H.-J. Niemann, Nachwort des Herausgebers (Editor's Afterword), in Popper (2022), pp. 617–653.
- Noble (2014), D. Noble, Secrets of life from beyond the grave, Physiology News 97, Winter 2014, p. 34–35.
- Popper (1986): Karl Popper, A New Interpretation of Darwinism. The First Medawar Lecture (1986), in: Niemann (2014), Appendix A.
- Popper (1990): K. R. Popper, A World of Propensities, Bristol, Thoemmes 1990.
- Popper (2012): K. R. Popper, Wissen und das Leib-Seele-Problem (Knowledge and the Body-Mind Problem), vol. 12 of the series Karl R. Popper. Gesammelte Werke in deutscher Sprache, ed. and transl. by H.-J. Niemann, Mohr Siebeck, Tübingen 2012, ISBN 978-3-16-150290-3. Part I: Karl Popper, Wissen und das Leib-Seele Problem (Knowledge and the Body-Mind Problem), ed. and transl. by H.-J. Niemann. Part II: Das Ich und sein Gehirn (The Self and Its Brain), newly translated by H.-J. Niemann from a partial translation by E. Schiffer.
- Popper (2016): K. R. Popper, Freiheit und intellektuelle Verantwortung (Freedom and Intellectual Responsibility), vol. 14 of the series Karl R. Popper. Gesammelte Werke in deutscher Sprache, ed. and partly newly translated by H.-J. Niemann, Mohr Siebeck, Tübingen 2016, ISBN 978-3-16-152744-9
- Popper (2022): K. R. Popper, Objektive Erkenntnis. Ein evolutionärer Entwurf (Objective Knowledge. An Evolutionary Approach), vol. 11 of the series Karl R. Popper. Gesammelte Werke in deutscher Sprache, edited and newly translated by H.-J. Niemann, 4th edition, expanded by seven new appendices, Mohr Siebeck, Tübingen 2022. ISBN 978-3-16-150678-9
