= Lancelot Law Whyte =

Scottish philosopher, theoretical physicist, historian and financier

Lancelot Law Whyte (4 November 1896 – 14 September 1972) was a Scottish philosopher, theoretical physicist, historian of science and financier.

== Early life and career ==
Lancelot Law Whyte, the son of Dr. Alexander Whyte, was born in Edinburgh, Scotland into the privileged childhood of a great house; Alexander Whyte was at the time a renowned Presbyterian minister. Lancelot received his education at Bedales School in England. He was a soldier during the First World War, returning to enter Trinity College, Cambridge and studying physics under Ernest Rutherford. Subsequently, he studied at Göttingen University in Germany. Whyte’s interest developed as much along lines of human evolution and philosophy as that of theoretical physics.

To earn a living, White entered industry and banking in Britain, but he returned to Germany for a year, where he met Albert Einstein. Back in Britain, in 1935 Whyte met Frank Whittle, one of the pioneers of the turbojet engine, and became a backer of the development of this invention, the eventual result being the British Air Ministry's initial commitment to the development of turbojet-powered planes, nearly five years later.

== Unified field theory ==
He claimed to have worked with Albert Einstein on the unified field theory. He further claimed that this work was based on the theory of the 18th century natural philosopher Roger Boscovich.

Whyte proposed something he called "the unitary principle" to unify physics theories. Experimental work on this theory was carried out by Leo Baranski.

== Evolution ==
Whyte was the author of the book Internal Factors in Evolution (1965). He proposed that Darwin's theory of natural selection is limited to external factors, and internal factors are a second directive agency in evolution. Whyte proposed the term "internal selection." John Tyler Bonner in the American Scientist positively reviewed the book. According to Bonner:

[Internal selection] is simply that there are two kinds of selection; an external Darwinian one and an internal one which is independent of the adaptability of the organism to a particular environment. The internal selection takes place by the machinery of the organism passing upon whether or not a particular mutation can survive considering the nature of internal milieu.

In 2014 the philosopher Hans-Joachim Niemann wrote about Whyte:

Whyte's ideas were beyond the long-established tracks but do not sound too far-fetched today. He postulated the existence of »directive factors« in the machinery of the cell. These factors control mutations as well as an »internal selection«, a particular kind of evolution separately optimizing processes in the cell. Whyte’s »internal selection« explained »the directions of evolutionary change by internal organizational factors«. His model demonstrates why some well-corroborated genes are protected, and why, on the other hand, sensible variations of certain traits are supported by well-directed mutations of the related genes. The cell is the conductor, and the genome is its score to be interpreted wisely.

Other scientists have been more critical. Biologist Robert E. Hillman gave the book a negative review, commenting "in a weak and ill-supported effort to deemphasize the role of natural selection in evolution Whyte has detracted from what could have been a fine analysis and philosophical discussion of the latest advances in the chemical basis of heredity and evolution."

== Works ==
=== Scientific papers ===
- Z. Phys., 56, 809, 1929. 'On the characteristics of a unified physical theory. I. The presence of a universal constant with the dimensions of a length.' (In German.)
- Z. Phys., 61, 274, 1930. 'Ditto. II. Rulers, clocks, and a possible alternative to 4-co-ordinate representation.' (In German.)
- Libr. of Xth Int. Congr. of Phil., Amsterdam, 1948. I. 298. 'One-way Processes in Biology.'
- Nature, 163, 762, 1949. 'Tendency towards Symmetry in Fundamental Physical Structures.'
- Nature, 166, 824, 1950. 'Planck's Constant and the Fine-Structure Constant.'
- Br. J. Philos. Sci., 1, 303, 1951. 'Fundamental Physical Theory. An Interpretation of the Present Position of the Theory of Particles.'
- Br. J. Philos. Sci., 3, 256, 1952. 'Angles in Fundamental Physics.'
- Am. Math. Mon., 59, 606, 1952. 'Unique Arrangements of Points on a Sphere.'
- Br. J. Philos. Sci., 3, 243, 1952. 'The Electric Current. A Study of the Role of Time in Electron Physics.'
- Br. J. Philos. Sci., 3, 349, 1953. 'Has a Single Electron a Transit Time?’
- Phil. Mag., 44, 1303, 1953. 'The Velocities of Fundamental Particles.'
- Br. J. Philos. Sci., 4, 160, 1953. 'Light Signal Kinematics.'
- Am. J. Phys., 21, 323, 1953. 'Dimensional Theory: Dimensionless Secondary Quantities.’
- Br. J. Philos. Sci., 5, 1, 1954. ‘A Dimensionless Physics ?’
- Nature, 174, 398, 1954. ‘Velocity of Electron Pulses.’ (With D. Gabor and D. L. Richards.)
- Br. J. Philos. Sci., 4, 337, 1954. ‘Geodesics and the Space and Time of Physical Observations.’
- Ann. Sci., 10, 20, 1954. ‘On the History of Natural Lengths.’
- Brain, 77 (I), 158, 1954. ‘Hypothesis regarding the Brain Modifications underlying Memory.’
- Br. J. Philos. Sci., 5, 332, 1955. ‘Note on the Structural Philosophy of Organism.’
- Br. J. Philos. Sci., 6, 107, 1955. ‘One-Way Processes in Physics and Bio-Physics.’
- Nature, 179, 284, 1957. ‘Boscovich and Particle Theory.’
- Nature, 180, 513, 1957. ‘Chirality.’
- Br. J. Philos. Sci., 7, 347, 1957. ‘On the Relation of Physical Laws to the Processes of Organisms.’
- Notes and Records, Roy. Soc. London, 13, 38, 1958. ‘R. J. Boscovich, 1711–1787, and the Mathematics of Atomism.’
- Nature, 182, 198, 1958. ‘Chirality.’
- Nature, 182,230, 1958. Report of Bicentenary Meeting, ‘Boscovich’s Theoria Philosophise Naturalis, 1758.
- Br. J. Philos. Sci., 9, 133, 1958. ‘The Scope of Quantum Mechanics.’

=== Books ===
- Archimedes, or the Future of Physics, Lancelot Law Whyte. Kegan Paul, Trench, Trubner & Co., LTD., London. 1927.
- Critique of Physics, Lancelot Law Whyte. Kegan Paul, Trench, Trubner & Co., LTD., London. 1931.
- The Next Development in Man, Lancelot Law Whyte. The Cresset Press, London. 1944.
- Everyman Looks Forward, Lancelot Law Whyte. The Cresset Press, London. 1946.
- The Unitary Principle in Physics and Biology, Lancelot Law Whyte. The Cresset Press, London. 1949.
- Accent on Form: An Anticipation of the Science of Tomorrow (World Perspectives, Volume Two), Lancelot Law Whyte. Harper & Brothers Publishers. 1954.
- The Unconscious before Freud: A History of the Evolution of Human Awareness, Lancelot Law Whyte. Basic Books, New York. 1960.
- Essay on Atomism: From Democritus to 1960, Lancelot Law Whyte. Nelson. 1961.
- The Atomic Problem: A Challenge to Physicists and Mathematicians, Lancelot Law Whyte. Allen & Unwin. 1961.
- Focus and Diversions, Lancelot Law Whyte. The Cresset Press, London. 1963.
- The Universe of Experience: A World View Beyond Science and Religion, Lancelot Law Whyte. Harper & Row Publishers. 1963.
- Internal Factors in Evolution, Lancelot Law Whyte. Braziller, New York. 1965.
- Aspects of Form: Symposium on Form in Nature and Art, Lancelot Law Whyte (editor). Lund Humphries Publishers, London. 1968.
- Hierarchical Structures, Lancelot Law Whyte (Editor). Elsevier. 1969.

== See also ==
- Classical unified field theories
