= Leo J. Baranski =

American scientist and researcher (1926–1971)

Leo John Baranski (1926 – August 9, 1971) was a scientist and researcher known for his work in resonance frequencies, relativity, and energy technologies. His contributions to theoretical physics, particularly in the development of Unified Field Theory (UFT), focused on energy transmission and biological interactions within scientific frameworks.

== Early life and education ==
Baranski's early life is not well documented, and there are limited records regarding his upbringing. He was a graduate of the College of Wooster, Ohio, and later earned an M.A. degree from Roosevelt University in Chicago before completing his Ph.D. at Princeton University in 1959. At Roosevelt University, he became the first student to achieve an all-"A" record at the graduate level. During his doctoral studies, he set a record for earning a perfect score on Princeton’s Ph.D. qualifying examination in the graduate psychology department.

Following his academic studies, Baranski taught psychology at Grinnell College, Iowa, and Los Angeles State College. From 1962 to February 1964, he was employed as a research specialist at North American Aviation Inc., contributing to scientific research. In July 1962, he was invited as a guest speaker at the Unification of the Sciences section of the Swiss Academy of Sciences in recognition of his contributions to the philosophy of science. He was also nominated for the 1962 California Scientist of the Year Award.

Baranski authored Scientific Basis for World Civilization, Unitary Field Theory, published by Christopher Publishing House in 1960. This work examines the origin, evolution, and future of the universe, life, and human society, integrating scientific, philosophical, and internationalist perspectives. His research extended into observer physics, where he explored fundamental principles of energy, motion, and information storage. Baranski's interdisciplinary approach combined elements of physics, psychology, and biology, reflecting his broad academic background. He planned two additional books: *The Experimental Methods for Determining the Structure Underlying Psychological Processes* and *A Provisional Universal Psychology*.

He and his wife, a research chemist, had three children and resided in Pasadena, California. A memorial scholarship in Baranski’s name has been established at California Lutheran University, reflecting recognition of his contributions.

== Career and contributions ==
Baranski worked for North American Aviation Inc., an aerospace company precursor to Boeing involved in several technological developments, including NASA's Apollo missions and aircraft such as the RS-70 bomber and X-15 rocket plane. His research also explored energy technologies related to resonance frequencies, studying potential applications of adenosine triphosphate (ATP) in power systems.

His studies on energy transmission proposed that specific frequencies could interact with biological systems in ways that might support or hinder cellular function. Additionally, he researched long-distance energy transmission and its feasibility for various technological applications.

Baranski was also involved in Unified Field Theory (UFT), a framework that sought to unify different scientific principles by exploring the connections between energy, biological processes, and relativity, while integrating psychological perspectives into physics. He collaborated with Lancelot Law Whyte (1896–1972), a Scottish physicist and philosopher known for his work on unified field theory and the "unitary principle," a framework to unify physical theories. Baranski contributed to experimental research related to this principle, focusing on its applications in energy transmission and resonance frequencies. Their collaboration aimed to expand Whyte’s theoretical foundations but was cut short by Baranski’s passing in 1971, followed by Whyte’s death in 1972.

== Political views ==
Baranski's political philosophy was deeply influenced by his scientific background and his belief in the transformative power of technology. He advocated for a technocratic approach to governance, emphasizing the integration of scientific advancements into policy-making to address societal challenges. Baranski believed that energy technologies and resonance frequencies could be harnessed to create more efficient and equitable societal structures, reducing reliance on traditional economic models.

Aligned with certain liberal ideals, Baranski championed intellectual freedom and the democratization of scientific knowledge. He argued that technological advancements should be accessible to the public rather than controlled by private institutions or government entities. His writings suggested that liberal governance, when combined with scientific rationalism, could lead to more equitable and progressive societal frameworks.

Despite his focus on scientific applications in politics, Baranski remained largely apolitical in public discourse, choosing to channel his efforts into academic research and technological innovation.

== Controversy and conspiracy theories ==
Baranski's experiments allegedly explored frequencies that could either enhance cellular regeneration or disrupt biological processes, leading to concerns about their misuse.

Various theories emerged regarding the circumstances of his death in 1971. Some sources suggest that his research posed a threat to established scientific paradigms, leading to efforts to obscure his contributions. Others argue that his work was simply ahead of its time and failed to gain mainstream recognition due to its unconventional nature.

Conspiracy theorists suggest that Baranski’s research into resonance frequencies may have intersected with classified military projects, potentially involving energy-based weaponry or advanced communication systems. Some sources speculate that his findings on biological interactions with electromagnetic fields could have influenced covert scientific programs.

Despite these claims, no definitive evidence has surfaced to confirm that Baranski’s work was actively suppressed or erased from scientific records. His contributions remain a subject of debate among researchers and conspiracy theorists alike.

== Legacy ==
Baranski died on August 9, 1971, at the age of 45. His untimely death left many of his pioneering ideas and inquiries about resonance frequencies, energy transmission, and theoretical physics unexplored.
