= Obscurantism =

Practice of obscuring information

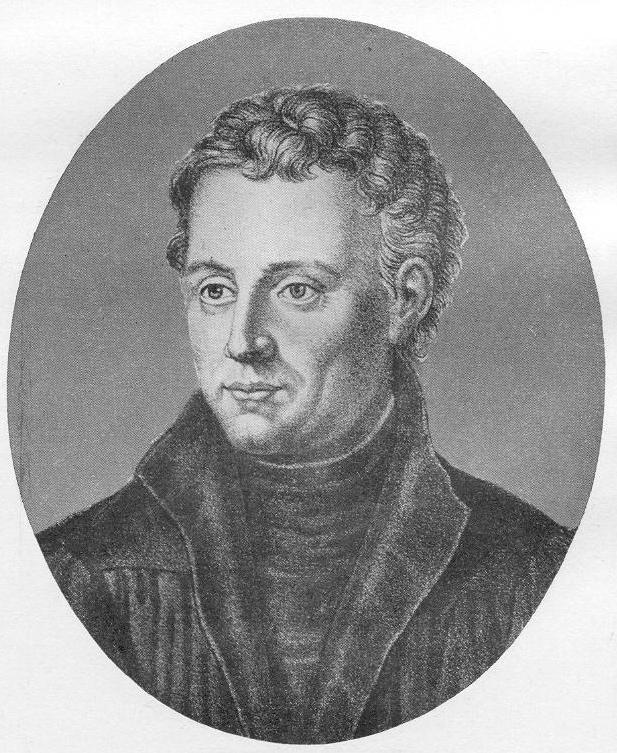
The term "obscurationism" was coined during debates involving scholar Johannes Reuchlin (1455–1522).

Obscurantism, also called obscurationism, is a polemical charge of deliberately presenting information in an abstruse and imprecise manner that limits further inquiry and understanding of a subject. Obscurantism has been defined as anti-intellectual opposition to the dissemination of knowledge and as writing characterized by deliberate vagueness.

In the 18th century, Enlightenment philosophers applied the term obscurantist to any enemy of intellectual enlightenment and the liberal diffusion of knowledge. In the 19th century, in distinguishing the varieties of obscurantism found in metaphysics and theology, from the "more subtle" obscurantism of the critical philosophy of Immanuel Kant and of modern philosophical skepticism, Friedrich Nietzsche said that: "The essential element in the black art of obscurantism is not that it wants to darken individual understanding, but that it wants to blacken our picture of the world, and darken our idea of existence."

== Restricting knowledge ==
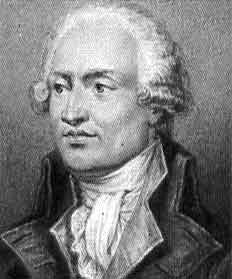
The Marquis de Condorcet, an 18th century philosopher, considered obscurantism as a contributing cause of the French Revolution in 1789.

In restricting education and knowledge to a ruling class, obscurantism is anti-democratic in its components of anti-intellectualism and social elitism, which exclude the majority of the people, deemed unworthy of knowing the facts about their government and the political and economic affairs of their city-state.

In 18th century monarchic France, the political scientist Marquis de Condorcet charged the aristocracy with "obscurantism" and indifference to the social problems that provoked the French Revolution (1789–1799), which violently overthrew the aristocracy and deposed the monarch, King Louis XVI (r. 1774–1792).

In the 19th century, the mathematician William Kingdon Clifford, who was an early proponent of Darwinism, worked to eliminate obscurantism in England after hearing clerics—who privately agreed with him about evolution—publicly denounce evolution as un-Christian heresy.

=== Leo Strauss ===
==== Political philosophy ====
In the 20th century, the American conservative political philosopher Leo Strauss and his neo-conservative adherents adopted the notion of government by the enlightened few as political strategy. He noted that intellectuals, dating from Plato, confronted the dilemma of either an informed populace "interfering" with government, or whether it were possible for good politicians to be truthful and still govern to maintain a stable society—hence the noble lie necessary in securing public acquiescence. In The City and Man (1964), he discusses the myths in The Republic that Plato proposes effective governing requires, among them, the belief that the country (land) ruled by the state belongs to it (despite some having been conquered from others), and that citizenship derives from more than the accident of birth in the city-state. Thus, in the New Yorker magazine article "Selective Intelligence", Seymour Hersh observes that Strauss endorsed the "noble lie" concept: the myths politicians use in maintaining a cohesive society.

Shadia Drury criticized Strauss's acceptance of dissembling and deception of the populace as "the peculiar justice of the wise", whereas Plato proposed the noble lie as based upon moral good. In criticizing Natural Right and History (1953), she said that "Strauss thinks that the superiority of the ruling philosophers is an intellectual superiority and not a moral one ... [he] is the only interpreter who gives a sinister reading to Plato, and then celebrates him."

==== Esoteric texts ====
Leo Strauss also was criticized for proposing the notion of "esoteric" meanings to ancient texts, obscure knowledge inaccessible to the "ordinary" intellect. In Persecution and the Art of Writing (1952), he proposes that some philosophers write esoterically to avert persecution by the political or religious authorities, and, per his knowledge of Maimonides, Al Farabi, and Plato, proposed that an esoteric writing style is proper for the philosophic text. Rather than explicitly presenting his thoughts, the philosopher's esoteric writing compels the reader to think independently of the text, and so learn. In the Phædrus, Socrates notes that writing does not reply to questions, but invites dialogue with the reader, thereby minimizing the problems of grasping the written word. Strauss noted that one of writing's political dangers is students' too-readily accepting dangerous ideas—as in the trial of Socrates, wherein the relationship with Alcibiades was used to prosecute him.

For Leo Strauss, philosophers' texts offered the reader lucid "exoteric" (salutary) and obscure "esoteric" (true) teachings, which are concealed to the reader of ordinary intellect; emphasizing that writers often left contradictions and other errors to encourage the reader's more scrupulous (re-)reading of the text. In observing and maintaining the "exoteric—esoteric" dichotomy, Strauss was accused of obscurantism, and for writing esoterically.

=== Bill Joy ===
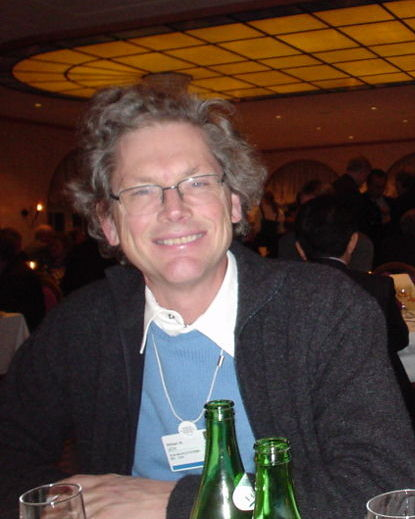
The computer scientist Bill Joy proposed controlling the public's access to certain data, information, and knowledge, because the public cannot handle the truth.

In the article "Why the Future Doesn't Need Us" (April 2000), the computer scientist Bill Joy, then chief scientist at Sun Microsystems, in the sub-title of the article proposed that: "Our most powerful twenty-first-century technologies—robotics, genetic engineering, and nanotech—are threatening to make humans an endangered species", and said that:

The experiences of the atomic scientists clearly show the need to take personal responsibility, the danger that things will move too fast, and the way in which a process can take on a life of its own. We can, as they did, create insurmountable problems in almost no time flat. We must do more thinking up front if we are not to be similarly surprised and shocked by the consequences of our inventions.

Critics readily noted the obscurantism in Joy's elitist proposal for limiting the dissemination of "certain knowledge" in order to preserve society. A year later, in the Science and Technology Policy Yearbook 2001, the American Association for the Advancement of Science answered Joy's propositions with the article "A Response to Bill Joy and the Doom-and-Gloom Technofuturists", wherein the computer scientists John Seely Brown and Paul Duguid said that Joy's proposal was a form of technological tunnel vision, and that the technologically derived problems are infeasible, for disregarding the influence of non-scientists upon such societal problems.

== Appeal to emotion ==
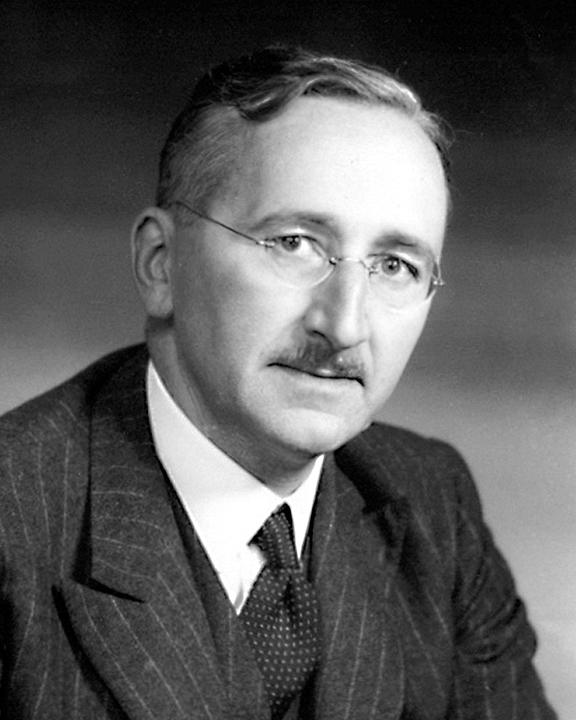
The economist Friedrich August von Hayek

In the essay "Why I Am Not a Conservative" (1960), the economist Friedrich von Hayek said that political conservatism is ideologically unrealistic, because of the conservative person's inability to adapt to changing human realities and refusal to offer a positive political program that benefits everyone in a society. In that context, Hayek used the term obscurantism differently, to denote and describe the denial of the empirical truth of scientific theory, because of the disagreeable moral consequences that might arise from acceptance of fact.

== Deliberate obscurity ==
The second sense of obscurantism denotes making knowledge abstruse, that is, difficult to grasp. In the 19th and 20th centuries obscurantism became a polemical term for accusing an author of deliberately writing obscurely, in order to hide his or her intellectual vacuousness. From that perspective, obscure (clouded, vague, abstruse) writing does not necessarily indicate that the writer has a poor grasp of the subject, because unintelligible writing sometimes is purposeful.

=== Aristotle ===
Aristotle

Aristotle divided his own works into two classifications: "exoteric" and "esoteric". Most scholars have understood this as a distinction of intended audience, where exoteric works were written for the public, and the esoteric works were more technical works intended for use within the Lyceum. Modern scholars commonly assume these latter to be Aristotle's own (unpolished) lecture notes or, in some cases, possible notes by his students. However, the 5th-century neoplatonist Ammonius Hermiae writes that Aristotle's writing style is deliberately obscurantist so that "good people may for that reason stretch their mind even more, whereas empty minds that are lost through carelessness will be put to flight by the obscurity when they encounter sentences like these".

In contemporary discussions of virtue ethics, Aristotle's Nicomachean Ethics (The Ethics) stands accused of ethical obscurantism, because of the technical, philosophic language and writing style, and their purpose being the education of a cultured governing elite.

=== Kant ===
Immanuel Kant employed technical terms that were not commonly understood by the layman. Arthur Schopenhauer contended that post-Kantian philosophers such as Johann Gottlieb Fichte, Friedrich Wilhelm Joseph Schelling, and Georg Wilhelm Friedrich Hegel deliberately imitated the abstruse style of writing practiced by Kant.

=== Hegel ===
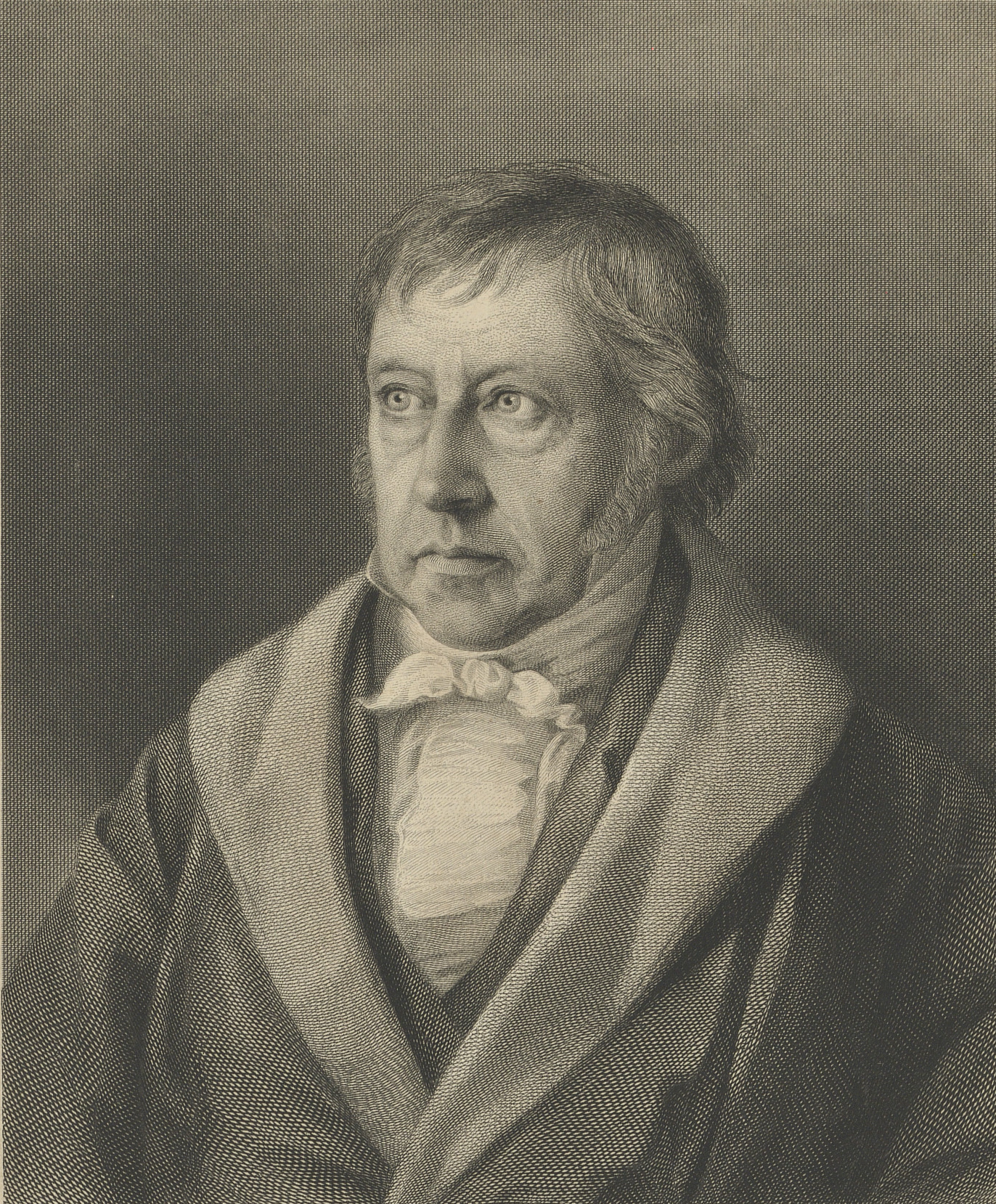
G. W. F. Hegel

G. W. F. Hegel's philosophy, and the philosophies of those he influenced, especially Karl Marx, have been accused of obscurantism. Analytic and positivistic philosophers, such as A. J. Ayer, Bertrand Russell, and the critical-rationalist Karl Popper, accused Hegel and Hegelianism of being obscure. About Hegel's philosophy, Schopenhauer wrote that it is "a colossal piece of mystification, which will yet provide posterity with an inexhaustible theme for laughter at our times, that it is a pseudo-philosophy paralyzing all mental powers, stifling all real thinking, and, by the most outrageous misuse of language, putting in its place the hollowest, most senseless, thoughtless, and, as is confirmed by its success, most stupefying verbiage".

Nevertheless, biographer Terry Pinkard notes: "Hegel has refused to go away, even in analytic philosophy, itself." Hegel was aware of his perceived obscurantism and perceived it as part of philosophical thinking: to accept and transcend the limitations of quotidian (everyday) thought and its concepts. In the essay "Who Thinks Abstractly?", he said that it is not the philosopher who thinks abstractly, but the layman, who uses concepts as givens that are immutable, without context. It is the philosopher who thinks concretely, because he transcends the limits of quotidian concepts, in order to understand their broader context. This makes philosophical thought and language appear obscure, esoteric, and mysterious to the layman.

=== Marx ===
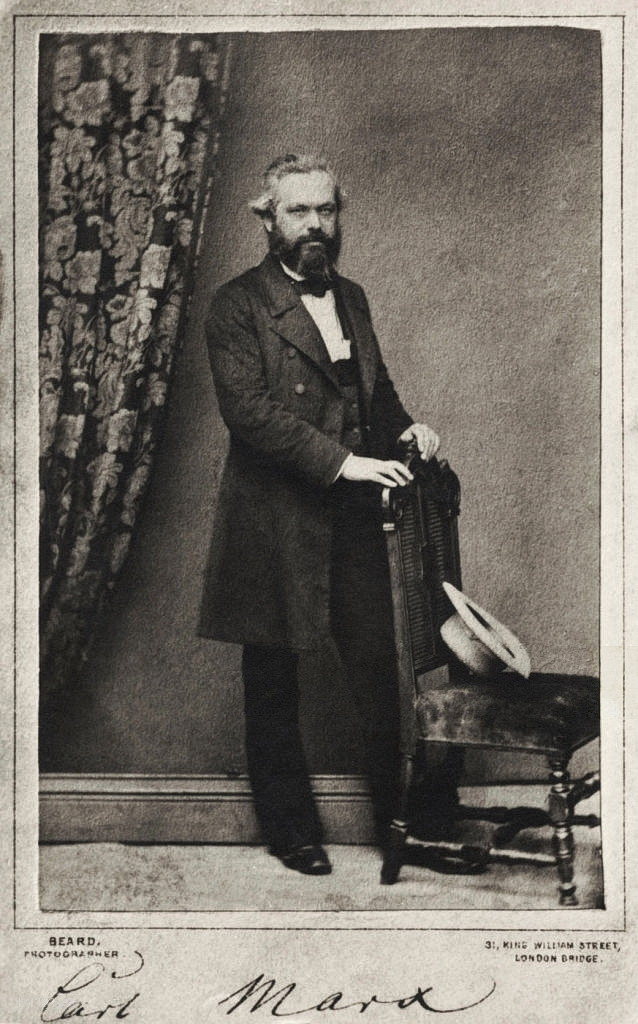
Karl Marx in 1861

In his early works, Karl Marx criticized German and French philosophy, especially German Idealism, for its traditions of German irrationalism and ideologically motivated obscurantism. Later thinkers whom he influenced, such as the philosopher György Lukács and social theorist Jürgen Habermas, followed with similar arguments of their own. However, philosophers such as Karl Popper and Friedrich Hayek in turn criticized Marx and Marxist philosophy as obscurantist (however, see above for Hayek's particular interpretation of the term).

=== Heidegger ===
Martin Heidegger, and those influenced by him, such as Jacques Derrida and Emmanuel Levinas, have been labeled obscurantists by critics from analytic philosophy and the Frankfurt School of critical theory. Of Heidegger, Bertrand Russell wrote: "his philosophy is extremely obscure. One cannot help suspecting that language is here running riot. An interesting point in his speculations is the insistence that nothingness is something positive. As with much else in Existentialism, this is a psychological observation made to pass for logic." That is Russell's complete entry on Heidegger, and it expresses the sentiments of many 20th-century analytic philosophers concerning Heidegger.

=== Derrida ===
In their obituaries "Jacques Derrida, Abstruse Theorist, Dies at 74" (10 October 2004) and "Obituary of Jacques Derrida, French intellectual" (21 October 2004), The New York Times newspaper and The Economist magazine described Derrida as a deliberately obscure philosopher.

In Contingency, Irony, and Solidarity (1989), Richard Rorty proposed that in The Post Card: From Socrates to Freud and Beyond (1978), Jacques Derrida purposefully used undefinable words (e.g. différance) and used defined words in contexts so diverse that they render the words unintelligible, hence, the reader is unable to establish a context for his literary self. In that way, the philosopher Derrida escapes metaphysical accounts of his work. Since the work ostensibly contains no metaphysics, Derrida has, consequently, escaped metaphysics.

Derrida's philosophic work is especially controversial among American and British academics, as when the University of Cambridge awarded him an honorary doctorate, despite opposition from among the Cambridge philosophy faculty and analytical philosophers worldwide. In opposing the decision, philosophers including Barry Smith, W. V. O. Quine, David Armstrong, Ruth Barcan Marcus, René Thom, and twelve others, published a letter of protestation in The Times of London, arguing that "his works employ a written style that defies comprehension ... [thus] Academic status based on what seems to us to be little more than semi-intelligible attacks upon the values of reason, truth, and scholarship is not, we submit, sufficient grounds for the awarding of an honorary degree in a distinguished university."

In February 1984 article in the New York Review of Books, "An Exchange on Deconstruction", John Searle comments on deconstruction as follows

"anyone who reads deconstructive texts with an open mind is likely to be struck by the same phenomena that initially surprised me: the low level of philosophical argumentation, the deliberate obscurantism of the prose, the wildly exaggerated claims, and the constant striving to give the appearance of profundity, by making claims that seem paradoxical, but under analysis often turn out to be silly or trivial".

=== Lacan ===
Jacques Lacan was an intellectual who defended obscurantism to a degree. To his students' complaint about the deliberate obscurity of his lectures, he replied: "The less you understand, the better you listen." In the 1973 seminar Encore, he said that his Écrits (Writings) were not to be understood, but would effect a meaning in the reader, like that induced by mystical texts. The obscurity is not in his writing style, but in the repeated allusions to Hegel, derived from Alexandre Kojève's lectures on Hegel, and similar theoretic divergences.

=== Sokal affair ===
The Sokal affair (1996) was a publishing hoax that the professor of physics Alan Sokal perpetrated on the editors and readers of Social Text, an academic journal of post-modern cultural studies that was not then a peer-reviewed publication. In 1996, as an experiment testing editorial integrity (fact-checking, verification, peer review, etc.), Sokal submitted "Transgressing the Boundaries: Towards a Transformative Hermeneutics of Quantum Gravity", a pseudoscientific article proposing that physical reality is a social construct, in order to learn whether Social Text would "publish an article liberally salted with nonsense if: (a) it sounded good, and, (b) it flattered the editors' ideological preconceptions". Sokal's fake article was published in the spring/summer 1996 issue of Social Text, which was dedicated to the science wars about the conceptual validity of scientific objectivity and the nature of scientific theory, among scientific realists and postmodern critics in American universities.

Sokal's reason for publication of a false article was that postmodernist critics questioned the objectivity of science, by criticising the scientific method and the nature of knowledge, usually in the disciplines of cultural studies, cultural anthropology, feminist studies, comparative literature, media studies, and science and technology studies. Whereas the scientific realists countered that objective scientific knowledge exists, riposting that postmodernist critics almost knew nothing of the science they criticized. In the event, editorial deference to "academic authority" (the author-professor) prompted the editors of Social Text not to fact-check Sokal's manuscript by submitting it to peer review by a scientist.

Concerning the lack of editorial integrity shown by the publication of his fake article in Social Text magazine, Sokal addressed the matter in the May 1996 edition of the Lingua Franca journal, in the article "A Physicist Experiments With Cultural Studies", in which he revealed that his transformative hermeneutics article was a parody, submitted "to test the prevailing intellectual standards", and concluded that, as an academic publication, Social Text ignored the requisite intellectual rigor of verification and "felt comfortable publishing an article on quantum physics without bothering to consult anyone knowledgeable in the subject".

Moreover, as a public intellectual, Sokal said that his hoax was an action protesting against the contemporary tendency towards obscurantism—abstruse, esoteric, and vague writing in the social sciences:

In short, my concern over the spread of subjectivist thinking is both intellectual and political. Intellectually, the problem with such doctrines is that they are false (when not simply meaningless). There is a real world; its properties are not merely social constructions; facts and evidence do matter. What sane person would contend otherwise? And yet, much contemporary academic theorizing consists precisely of attempts to blur these obvious truths—the utter absurdity of it all being concealed through obscure and pretentious language.

As a pseudoscientific opus, the article "Transgressing the Boundaries: Towards a Transformative Hermeneutics of Quantum Gravity" is described as an exemplar "pastiche of left-wing cant, fawning references, grandiose quotations, and outright nonsense, centered on the claim that physical reality is merely a social construct".

== See also ==
- Disinformation
- Doublespeak
- Greenspeak
- Obfuscation (software)
- Perception management
- Philosopher king
- Politicization of science
- Pseudophilosophy
- Psychological manipulation
- Scientism
