= Bagnoud Observatory =

François-Xavier Bagnoud Observatory
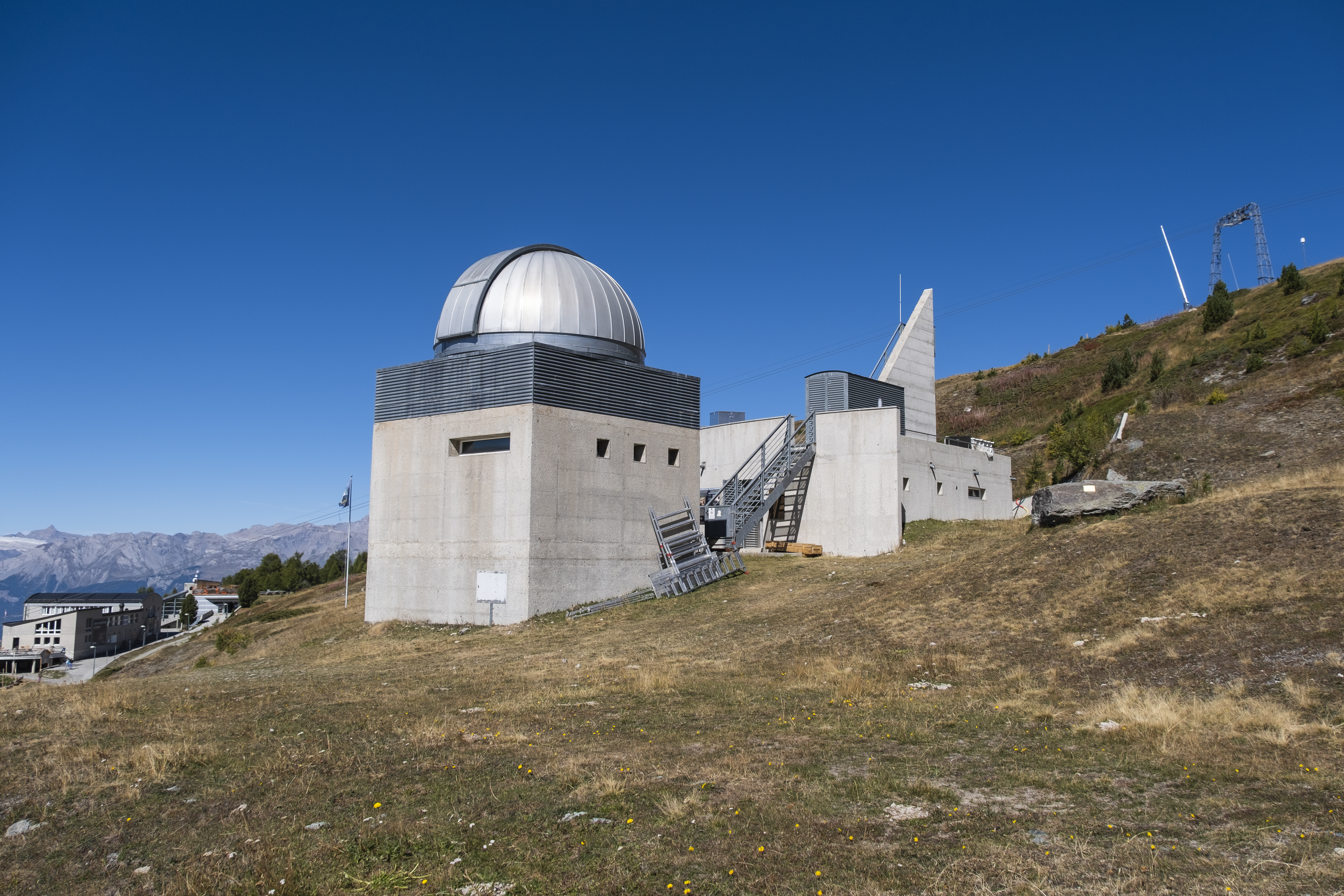
- Alternative names: OFXB
- Observatory code: 175
- Location: Saint-Luc, Valais, Switzerland
- Coordinates: 46°13′42″N 7°36′45″E
- Altitude: 2,200 m (7,200 ft)
- Website: www.ofxb.ch
- Related media on Commons

François-Xavier Bagnoud Observatory (French: Observatoire François-Xavier Bagnoud) is an astronomical observatory located above the village of Saint-Luc in Valais, Switzerland, close to the top of the funicular, at a height of 2,200 m (7,200 ft). It is a non-profit organisation funded by Association François-Xavier Bagnoud and named after a Swiss rescue pilot.

Opened in 1995, the observatory was established to promote astronomy education and public engagement. Its facilities are accessible to schools, amateur astronomers, and visitors, supporting both hands-on learning and public demonstrations in daytime and nighttime conditions. Unlike most mountain observatories equipped with professional instruments, it is not reserved solely for scientists but is open to the public.

The observatory has 60 cm (24 in) and 15 cm (5.9 in) telescopes, as well as a heliostat, a weather station, a planetarium, and a planet trail between the observatory and the funicular. In 2007, it contributed to the detection of Gliese 436 b, a Neptune-sized exoplanet composed largely of hot ice.

== History ==
In 2007, the observatory contributed to the discovery of Gliese 436 b, a planet located 30 light years away. Using its 24-inch telescope, astronomers saw the host star briefly dim as the planet passed in front of it. The observatory’s director said it as the first time both the mass and size of a non-gaseous extrasolar planet had been measured precisely, calling the discovery “a great step towards the search for other planets that resemble Earth”.
