= Association François-Xavier Bagnoud =

International human rights, health and aid organization

FXB International
- Abbreviation: FXB
- Named after: François-Xavier Bagnoud
- Formation: 1989
- Founder: Albina du Boisrouvray
- Region served: International

Association François-Xavier Bagnoud, is an international development organization aimed at providing support for communities affected by AIDS and poverty. The organization was founded in 1989 by Albina du Boisrouvray.

== History ==
Association François-Xavier Bagnoud, abbreviated FXB, is named after François-Xavier Bagnoud, a helicopter search-and-rescue pilot who died in 1986 while serving as a transport pilot in Mali during the Paris-Dakar rally. He became the youngest professional Instrument Flight Related (IFR) airplane and helicopter pilot in Europe at age 23. Bagnoud was involved in over 300 rescue missions as part of Sion, Switzerland's Air Glaciers.

In 1989, along with the help of family and friends, Albina du Boisrouvray founded both the FXB Foundation and Association François-Xavier Bagnoud in honor of her late son. In order to finance the operations of both the foundation and NGO, du Boisrouvray sold off three quarters of her business holdings, as well as paintings, pre-Columbian gold and silver objects, and her country home near Paris, raising $100 million.

Du Boisrouvray allocated part of the profits to the FXB Foundation to create programs, including an at home palliative care program for the terminally ill in Switzerland and France, a rescue helicopter control centre in the Swiss Alps, and a professorship at the University of Michigan (her son's alma mater). With the other half of the funds generated, du Boisrouvray founded FXB International, a development organization. As a reflection of "the values of generosity and compassion that guided François's life", the organization was initially created to support children affected by AIDS.

== Association François-Xavier Bagnoud (NGO) ==
In November 1989, Albina du Boisrouvray and FXB, in partnership with Médecins du Monde (Doctors of the World), successfully lobbied the United Nations in to adopt the Convention on the Rights of the Child in November 1989 by organizing a symbolic sailing voyage, retracing the former slave route with 15 children of different ethnicities.

In 1991, working with a group of Thai activists, Albina du Boisrouvray and Médecins du Monde freed several dozen underage sex workers, including eight HIV-positive Burmese girls from a brothel in Chiang Mai, Thailand. Du Boisrouvray then discovered other girls were being trafficked to brothels in Ranong in western Thailand near the south tip of Burma. She informed Saisuree Chutikul, a Thai cabinet minister, who in turn instructed Thai police to raid the brothels. This raid freed 270 women, including 95 Burmese sex workers, half of whom were HIV-positive. In order to ensure the group's safety and guarantee that they would receive medical and psychosocial support, du Boisrouvray traveled to Burma.

In 1992, FXB established four FXB houses in Chiang Mai, Thailand to care for abandoned HIV and AIDS orphans in collaboration with the locally based Support the Children Foundation. Through the International Network of Engaged Buddhists (INEB), du Boisrouvray, in collaboration with a Buddhist monk, Phra Alongkot, started an AIDS hospice in Central Thailand. Wat Prabat Namphu, in Lop Buri province, is now a famous temple of last resort for AIDS victims. The hospice is now run by a local foundation.

In 1993, FXB established a presence in Myanmar, one of the few Western organizations to support AIDS projects in the country at the time, following on earlier FXB clinics and village projects in Thailand, Uganda, Burundi, among others. In 1996, FXB received consultative status from the United Nations Economic and Social Council.

== FXBVillage Methodology ==
Developed in 1991 by Albina du Boisrouvray, the FXBVillage methodology is a community-based, sustainable approach to overcoming the AIDS orphans crisis and extreme poverty.

Each FXBVillage supports 80-100 families, comprising approximately 500 individuals, mostly children. Over a three-year period, FXB provides communities with necessary life skills in the hope that they will become physically, financially and socially independent. FXB provides grants for income generating activities, forgoing the conventional use of microcredit for the extreme poor. In the first year of the program, FXB provides 100 percent of the funding for the income generating activities and basic human needs. In the second year, FXB provides 75 percent of the funding while the program participants cover the remaining 25 percent. In the third year, FXB and the program participant each cover 50 percent of the funding, and by the end of the three-year program, participants are physically, financially and socially independent. Over the course of the program, FXB invests around $260,000 per FXBVillage to insure that participants have the essentials, ranging from shelter and food to access to education. Many of the FXB-trained entrepreneurs are women, who have been widowed or abandoned by men due to AIDs. FXB operates in countries where communities are dealing with not only endemic poverty, but have experienced the trauma of rape and war as well.

Throughout the 1990s and 2000s, FXB launched FXBVillage programs in countries including Burundi, China, Colombia, the Democratic Republic of the Congo, India, Rwanda, Thailand and Uganda.

As reported in a 2009 UNICEF study, a mid-term evaluation by Beijing Institute of Information and Control (BIIC) of an FXBVillage in China focused on FXB's approach to the psychological needs of orphaned and vulnerable children. BIIC's mid-term evaluation data showed that severe depression in children in the program was reduced from 89 percent to 4.5 percent over 18 months.

In 2007, the Human Sciences Research Council conducted a study of the FXBVillage participants and found up to 86 percent of FXBVillage participants remained above the poverty line four years after the program's end. FXB was awarded a grant from the United States Agency for International Development to develop 20 new FXBVillages in Uganda and Rwanda in 2009.

In a 2009 evaluation of the FXBVillage in Buriram, Thailand conducted by Thaksin University, researchers found that 100 percent of youth participants completed primary school and moved on to secondary education, whereas the national average for primary school completion was at 40 percent. Additionally, the evaluation saw an increase of 60 to 62 percent in the average income earned by participating families, with over 80 percent of the families continuing to pursue their income generating activities. The evaluation concluded that the FXBVillage had been implemented effectively and "improved the living conditions of a large number of orphans and vulnerable children."

As of 2015, 69,500 participants in eight countries have graduated from the FXBVillage programs. Another 12,500 are currently involved. FXB currently operates ongoing FXBVillages in Burundi, China, Colombia, India, Rwanda, Thailand and most recently, Mongolia.

=== FXBVillage Toolkit and Planning Guide ===
In May 2015, FXB released the FXBVillage Toolkit and Planning Guide, a 200-page planning guide to the organization's FXBVillage model developed with the FXB Center for Health and Human Rights at Harvard University and endorsed by Sudhir Anand, development microeconomist and Harvard University professor, and Nobel Laureate Amartya Sen. The model aims to help NGOs, governments, and philanthropies identify and simultaneously address the five drivers of poverty including health care, housing, education, nutrition, and sustainable business.

== FXB Foundation ==
In 1989, while investigating ways to help children with AIDS through the FXB Foundation, Albina du Boisrouvray began working with Dr. James Oleske, a pediatric immunologist at the University of Medicine and Dentistry of New Jersey in Newark. Dr. Oleske helped establish that AIDS can be passed from parent to child before birth. Since then, the FXB Foundation has opened a center that trains AIDS workers from around the world at the university, as well as providing $2.25 million toward further research.

FXB also launched the Global AIDS Policy Coalition at the Harvard School of Public Health.

Since 1990, the FXB Foundation has provided fellowships to doctoral students, as well as putting $5.2 million towards the construction of the FXB Building for aerospace engineering at the University of Michigan. In 1995, the FXB Foundation opened the François-Xavier Bagnoud Observatory at Saint-Luc in Valais, Switzerland.

In 1992, the FXB Palliative Home Care Center was established in Switzerland to provide palliative care at home to people in the last phases of incurable diseases when medicine is ineffective. In 1997, FXB replicated the FXB Palliative Home Care model in Paris. In 2001, Albina du Boisrouvray was appointed Chevalier de la Légion d'Honneur by the French Government for her pioneering work in home palliative care projects. The FXB Foundation also launched the FXB House, a Washington, D.C., home for children affected by HIV/AIDS and other illnesses.

=== FXB Center for Health & Human Rights at Harvard University ===
In January 1993, the FXB Foundation established the FXB Center for Health and Human Rights at the Harvard School of Public Health through a $20 million donation to Harvard University. The FXB Foundation's donation was the largest gift ever received by the Harvard School of Public Health. The donation also went towards the construction of the François-Xavier Bagnoud building on Huntington Avenue in Boston's Longwood Medical Area, and the François-Xavier Bagnoud Professorship in Health and Human Rights at the Harvard School of Public Health.

The center was the first academic center to focus exclusively on Health and Human Rights. It also produces the Health and Human Rights, published by FXB and Harvard University Press. Albina du Boisrouvray's work with Dr. Jonathan Mann around linking Health and Human Rights influenced FXB's philosophy. Dr. Mann, a pioneer in the international campaign against AIDS, was the first director of the FXB Center for Health and Human Rights.

In 2012, Harvard University Press published The Cost of Inaction, a book of case studies from Rwanda and Angola demonstrating to governments and policy-makers the cost effectiveness of alleviating poverty. Harvard assembled a team of economists and public health researchers, led by Professor Sudhir Anand, to "address the challenges of enumerating and quantifying the multiple social and economic costs that follow when societies fail its citizens." In a foreword to the study, Nobel Prize winner Amartya Sen urged that the "cost of inaction" analysis be adopted by policymakers, who must set priorities based on an empirical framework.

== Other initiatives ==
FXB is also the co-chair of the Global Action for Children, a coalition dedicated to helping vulnerable children and orphans in the developing world.

In 2001, FXB partnered with the Early Childhood Development (ECD) team within the World Bank to launch the AIDS Orphan Assistance Database, a website that connects individuals and companies to children around the world orphaned by HIV/AIDS.

Albina du Boisrouvray attended the first Clinton Global Initiative Annual Meeting in 2005 and was a speaker at the 2007 Annual Meeting. FXB made or partnered on CGI Commitments to Action in 2005, 2006 and 2007.

=== Worlds AIDS Orphan Day ===
FXB launched World AIDS Orphans Day has been observed on May 7 since 2002, established at the initiative of Albina du Boisrouvray and FXB. Du Boisrouvray presented UN Secretary-General Kofi Annan with a dossier containing two million signatures of people all over the world, calling for national governments and international organizations to protect the fundamental rights of HIV-positive children. The grass-roots campaign advocates for on behalf of more than 15 million children orphaned by AIDS. The day is observed annually on May 7 and is supported by individuals, governments, and charitable organizations around the world.
