= Student Global AIDS Campaign =

Advocacy group

The Student Global AIDS Campaign (SGAC) is an advocacy group with more than 85 chapters at high schools, colleges, and universities across the United States. The group is committed to bringing an end to HIV and AIDS in the U.S. and around the world, and uses a wide variety of tactics to achieve its goals, including education on campuses, letter-writing and calling campaigns to decision-makers, public demonstrations, media work, and other activist tactics.

The organization often describes its mission in the shorthand 'Fund the Fight, Treat the People, Drop the Debt, Stop the Spread'. The fuller vision statement is: "We envision a world in which AIDS is no longer a death sentence, in which economics and geography do not determine access to life-saving drugs, and where every woman, man, and child has the knowledge, means, and rights to protect her- or himself from infection." The campaign has therefore pushed for access to antiretroviral drugs, the elimination of third world debt, reform of global trade rules, and access to condoms.

== Major events & recent successes ==
- "Kick Coke Off Campus": SGAC joined with other AIDS activists to pressure Coca-Cola to treat its HIV+ workers in its African bottling plants
- Bake Sale for the Global Fund: where SGACers sold brownies for $1 billion in front of representatives' and senators' offices to try to raise the money Congress wasn’t giving to the Global Fund
- 04.Stop.AIDS: a loose network of HIV and AIDS activists, many of them SGACers, who went to presidential candidates' events and asked pointed questions until every Democratic Party candidate adopted a progressive platform on global AIDS (President George W. Bush refused to talk with the activists or allow them into events)
- Student March Against AIDS: on February 26, 2005, SGAC held the second largest HIV and AIDS mobilization in U.S. history. More than 4,000 students and young people from around the country rallied together in DC for the Student March Against AIDS.
- Gilead Sciences Corporate Campaign: in spring 2006, SGAC took on its second corporate campaign, this time targeting the marketers of second-line AIDS drugs who had failed to make those medicines accessible to lower and middle income countries. The company Gilead Sciences eventually made major concessions to make its drug Tenofovir more available and allow generic competition.
- In the fall of 2006, SGAC began an expanded campaign focused on pushing for Universal Access to AIDS Treatment by the year 2010.

== History & founding ==
In February 2001, the Student Global AIDS Campaign and its parent organization, Global Justice, were founded simultaneously by students at Harvard University and Harvard Kennedy School who saw the untapped potential of students to advocate political and social change on global HIV and AIDS and other issues of global justice. Global Justice became officially incorporated as a 501 (c)(3) organization, with the Student Global AIDS Campaign as its first campaign.

The first conference was a New England regional conference hosted by Harvard in the fall of 2001. That spring and the next fall regional conferences were also held at Indiana University, the University of Wisconsin–Madison, and Williams College. In the spring of 2003, SGAC organized its first national conference (hosted by George Washington University), which was attended by more than 500 students from around the country.

As SGAC’s chapter base has grown so has its capacity for effective advocacy. SGAC’s first large rally was held in Boston in the spring of 2002 to demand that Senator John Kerry (who had declared himself the Senate AIDS leader) significantly increase the amount of funding for the Global Fund in the bill he was then writing.

== Structure ==
SGAC is a youth- and student-led organization organized into chapters based at high schools or universities. There is a national Steering Committee (SC) of students from across the country. Elected by SGAC members for one-year terms, SC members deal with the day-to-day operation of the campaign and fill roles ranging from media coordination to outreach work. Decisions are made by consensus.

== Global Justice ==
The Student Global AIDS Campaign's original parent organization, Global Justice, was also home to other student-led campaigns on global trade and child survival. Global Justice also employs the staff that work on the Student Global AIDS Campaign, including a full-time national organizer, a shared executive director, and support/communications staff. Global Justice is governed by a board of directors which has included such activists and intellectuals as Jeffrey Sachs, Paul Farmer, and ACT UP co-founder Eric Sawyer, as well as students from each of the group's campaigns. There is also an emerging alumni group of previous leaders who have now graduated.

== Health Global Access Project ==
The Student Global AIDS Campaign became a project of Health Global Access Project (Health GAP), an international AIDS advocacy organization in 2008.

== Alumni ==
SGAC has several notable alumni including Ben Wikler, Amirah Sequeira (the youngest political director of a national labor union National Nurses United), Jamila Headley, Executive Director of Be A Hero, Luke Messac and numerous well known doctors.

== See also ==
- The Global Fund to Fight AIDS, Tuberculosis and Malaria
