= Albina du Boisrouvray =

French film producer

- Born: 2 July 1939 (age 87); Paris, France
- Education: University of Sorbonne
- Organization: Association François-Xavier Bagnoud
- Spouse(s): Bruno Bagnoud (divorced) Georges Casati (div. 1982)
- Children: François-Xavier Bagnoud (1961–1986)
- Parent(s): Countess Luz Mila de Jacquelot du Boisrouvray (née Patiño Rodríguez); Count Guy de Jacquelot du Boisrouvray
- Relatives: Simón Patiño (grandfather); Rainier III, Prince of Monaco (second cousin)

Albina du Boisrouvray (born 2 July 1939) is a former journalist and film producer who has become a global philanthropist and social entrepreneur working with AIDS victims and impoverished communities around the world. In 1989, she founded with Bruno Bagnoud and Georges Casati Association François-Xavier Bagnoud, a non-governmental organization established in memory of her son, François-Xavier Bagnoud. This NGO is now called FXB Switzerland and is part of the FXB Global Foundation, alongside the NGOs FXB France and FXB USA.

Du Boisrouvray is a grandchild of the Bolivian King of Tin, Simón Patiño. She is a second cousin of Prince Rainier of Monaco and godmother to Charlotte Casiraghi, daughter of Princess Caroline of Monaco.

== Early life and education ==
She is the daughter of Count Guy de Jacquelot du Boisrouvray (1903-1980) and Luz Mila Patiño Rodríguez (1909-1958) (her name is also reported as Luzmila). Her paternal grandmother was born countess Joséphine Marie Louise de Polignac, eldest sister of Prince Pierre, Duke of Valentinois, the father of Rainier III, Prince of Monaco. Her maternal grandfather was Simón Patiño, one of the wealthiest men in the world at the time of her birth.

Her father was part of the Free French movement and her family left the country while she was an infant. Du Boisrouvray grew up in New York City and lived at the Plaza Hotel. Her family later moved to Argentina, and du Boisrouvray lived alone in Switzerland, Morocco, England and back to France.

Du Boisrouvray attended University of Sorbonne in Paris where she studied psychology and philosophy.

== Career ==
Du Boisrouvray began her career as a journalist. She worked as a freelance journalist for Le Nouvel Observateur, covering international stories such as the death of Che Guevara. She later co-founded the literary magazine Libre with Juan Goytisolo.

In 1978, du Boisrouvray ran as a candidate for the Friends of the Earth party in parliamentary elections.

She founded a film production company, Albina Productions, in 1969 and is credited with producing 22 films over a period of 17 years. These films include Pascal Thomas' first film, Les Zozos (1972), L'important c'est d'aimer and Une Femme a sa fenêtre, both of which starred Romy Schneider, and Fort Saganne (1984), directed by Alain Corneau and starring Gérard Depardieu, Catherine Deneuve and Sophie Marceau. Police Python 357 (1976) notably was one of the few films which starred Yves Montand and Simone Signoret, a well-known couple, in the same film. Du Boisrouvray began serving as the chairperson of SEGH, her family's real estate and hotel management group, in 1980 at the death of her father.

=== Association François-Xavier Bagnoud ===
Following the death of her only child, du Boisrouvray sold three-quarters of her own assets, including the film studio, and her parental inheritance of jewels (totaling $100 million) in an auction at Sotheby's in New York for $31 million, an art collection of $20 million, and a substantial part of her family's real-estate business which garnered $50 million. The Sotheby's auction was the largest jewelry sale since the Duchess of Windsor's auction. The sale included pre-Columbian gold, jade and other notable pieces accumulated by the noble French family. Du Boisrouvray allocated part of the profits to the first FXB Foundation to create programs, including an at home palliative care program for the terminally ill in Switzerland and France, and other programs of the community life in the valais. As well as a rescue helicopter control centre in the Swiss Alps, and a professorship at the University of Michigan (her son's alma mater). The foundation also funded a building FXB aerospace, the center of vertical flying and the fellowships as well as programs at Rudgers University (University of medicine and entomology of New Jersey UMDMJ) with Doctor Oleske and nurse Mary Boland to fight aids and train doctors and nurses from all over the world, the paediatric infectious diseases and the Mary Boland nurse chair.

The rest of the funds were used to found Association François-Xavier Bagnoud (FXB Switzerland) and later on FXB USA and FXB France, in memory of her son, François-Xavier Bagnoud, a search-and-rescue pilot who died while serving as a transport pilot in Mali during the Paris-Dakar rally in 1986.

Du Boisrouvray founded this NGO to fight poverty and AIDS, and support orphans and vulnerable children left in the wake of the AIDS pandemic. Association François-Xavier Bagnoud, also known as FXB Switzerland, offers comprehensive support to the families and communities that care for these children, and advocates for their fundamental rights. The organization as a whole (FXB Global Foundation) has helped over 20 million people from programs in more than 20 countries, with a staff of over 400. Du Boisrouvray broadened its work from supporting children impacted by AIDS to also include all families needing support to emerge from extreme poverty and become self-sufficient through the FXBVillage methodology. In 1991, she developed the FXBVillage Methodology, a community-based, sustainable approach to overcoming the AIDS orphans crisis and extreme poverty. Each FXBVillage supports 80-100 families, comprising approximately 500 individuals, mostly children. Over a three-year period, FXB provides communities with the resources and training needed to become physically, financially and socially independent in order to enable them to raise their children and orphans rescued out of extreme poverty. According to FXB, the FXBVillage program has graduated over 69,500 participants from eight countries and has over 12,500 current participants. At the time, it was a big innovation to drop the micro credit and replace it with the gift of an enterprise that hasten success to pull people out of extreme poverty in 3 years.

In 1993, du Boisrouvray founded the FXB Center for Health and Human Rights at Harvard University, the first academic center to focus exclusively on health and human rights.

Association François-Xavier Bagnoud is now called FXB Switzerland and is part of the FXB Global Foundation, alongside the NGOs FXB France and FXB USA, whose activities cover the fields of humanitarian aid, health, education and climate change.

== Awards and recognition ==
Du Boisrouvray was made Chevalier des Arts et des Lettres in 1985. In 1993, the University of Michigan conferred upon her a "Doctor of Humane Letters Degree," and she was made a "John Harvard Fellow" by Harvard University in 1996.

She received a Special Recognition Award for "Responding to the HIV/AIDS Orphan crisis" at the second conference on Global Strategies for the prevention of HIV transmission from mothers to infants in Montreal, in September 1999. In 2001, Harvard students presented her with the "Harvard Project for International Health and Development Award".

Her philanthropy and humanitarian efforts earned her a knighthood of the Légion d'Honneur in 2001 for her pioneering work in home palliative care projects. Also in 2001, because of the innovative cost-effective projects that she formulated and directed within FXB, she was selected as a member of the Social Entrepreneurs Group of the Schwab Foundation. This recognition enables the 54 social entrepreneurs of the group to participate in the Davos World Economic Forum and to present and to share their expertise with world business leaders in the civil and public sectors.

She was awarded the 2002 North-South Prize by the Council of Europe. In November 2003, du Boisrouvray received the "Lifetime Achievement Award" at the 4th International Conference on AIDS in India, in recognition for the projects that she initiated in the 35 States and Territories of India. In 2007, the French Fédération nationale des Clubs Convergences gave her an award for her activities on behalf of orphans and vulnerable children affected by AIDS in the world.

In 2004, Albina received the Thai Komol Keemthong Foundation Award for Outstanding Personality for the year 2004. The award was given in appreciation of her contributions to Thailand and Burma in the fields of protecting children and women's rights, education, vocational training and support of HIV/AIDS-affected children and their families.

In 1985, she was appointed Knight of the National Order of Merit for her entire body of cinematographic work, notably Fort Saganne, and became the first film producer to receive the Order of Merit. In April 2009, French President Nicolas Sarkozy presented du Boisrouvray with the insignia of Officer in l'Ordre National du Mérite. The President honoured Albina and her work, saying "Your NGO is a model throughout the world. You are a woman involved. Your solidarity is exemplary and that is why the Republic will distinguish you." In June 2009, du Boisrouvray received the BNP Paribas Jury's Special Prize.

In 2013, the Kalinga Institute of Social Sciences awarded du Boisrouvray their Humanitarian Award which recognizes individuals with exceptionally high contribution to society and who have distinguished themselves as humanitarians.

== Publications ==
- Phoenix Rising: A Woman's Story of Love, Loss, & the Will to Change the World. Nomad Publishing, November 2025. ISBN 978-1-917045-22-3.
- Le Courage de Vivre: Se rebeller, perdre l'essentiel, tout donner. Editions Flammarion, March 2022. ISBN 978-2-08-025131-2.

== Personal life ==
Du Boisrouvray was married twice, first to Swiss aviator Bruno Bagnoud and second to French production manager and line producer Georges Casati, whom she divorced in 1982. She met Bagnoud while living in Valais. They were married for four years and had one son together, François-Xavier Bagnoud (1961–1986), killed in a helicopter crash in the Sahel desert in Mali alongside French singer Daniel Balavoine and Dakar Rally founder Thierry Sabine.

She lives in Portugal, near Lisbon, part of the year and has homes in Paris, New York and Switzerland.
