= Gillian Brock =

New Zealand philosopher

Gillian Greenwall Brock FRSNZ
- Education: Duke University
- Scientific career
- Thesis: On the moral importance of needs (1993)

Gillian Greenwall Brock FRSNZ is a New Zealand philosophy and ethics academic. She is currently a full professor at the University of Auckland and fellow at the Edmond J. Safra Center for Ethics, Harvard University.

== Academic career ==
After obtaining a BSc and BA(Hons) at the University of Cape Town, Brock completed her PhD at Duke University in 1993. Her thesis was titled 'On the moral importance of needs' . She moved to the University of Auckland and rose to full professor. In 2018, Brock was elected a Fellow of the Royal Society of New Zealand.

Brock's work relates to the ethical obligations we have to meet the needs of others and has written on issues such as the 'brain drain' and global justice.

== Selected works ==
- Brock, Gillian. Global justice: A cosmopolitan account. Oxford University Press, 2009.
- Brock, Gillian, and Harry Brighouse, eds. The political philosophy of cosmopolitanism. Cambridge University Press, 2005, ISBN 978-0-52184-660-8.
- Brock, Gillian. Necessary Goods: our responsibilities to meet others needs. Rowman & Littlefield Publishers, 1998.
- Benatar, Solomon, and Gillian Brock, eds. Global health and global health ethics. Cambridge University Press, 2011.
- Brock, Gillian, and Michael Blake. Debating brain drain: may governments restrict emigration?. Oxford University Press, 2014.
