= Hans Albert =

German philosopher (1921–2023)

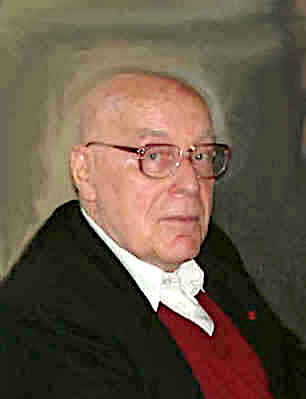
- Albert in 2005
- Born: 8 February 1921; Cologne, Rhine Province, Prussia, Weimar Germany
- Died: 24 October 2023 (aged 102); Heidelberg, Baden-Württemberg, Germany

Education
- Education: University of Cologne (PhD)
- Doctoral advisor: Leopold von Wiese
- Other advisor: Gerhard Weisser

Philosophical work
- Era: Contemporary philosophy
- Region: Western philosophy
- School: Analytic philosophy; Critical rationalism
- Institutions: University of Mannheim
- Main interests: Philosophy of social science, Philosophy of science, epistemology, rationality, uncertainty, justificationism
- Notable ideas: Application of critical rationalism to social and political theory Münchhausen trilemma

Hans Albert (German: [ˈalbɛʁt]; 8 February 1921 – 24 October 2023) was a German philosopher. He was professor of social sciences at the University of Mannheim from 1963, and remained at the university until 1989. His fields of research were social sciences and general studies of methods. He was a critical rationalist, paying special attention to rational heuristics. Albert was a strong critic of the continental hermeneutic tradition coming from Heidegger and Gadamer.

== Life and career ==
Albert was born in Cologne, Germany, on 8 February 1921, the son of a teacher of Latin and history. He served in WW2, gaining the Iron Cross 2nd Class. In 1950 he earned a degree in business administration at the University of Cologne, followed by a PhD in social politics in 1952. From 1952–1958 he worked as an assistant at the research institute for social and administrative sciences at the university, where he also obtained a Dr. habil. in social politics in 1957. As a lecturer, he read logic, theory of science, and economics of the welfare state. Beginning in 1958 he participated in the Alpbacher Hochschulwochen (a summer conference in the Austrian alpine village of Alpbach), where he met Karl Popper after having studied and mostly embracing his philosophy. After 1955, he had discussions with Paul Feyerabend, who in those times was a critical rationalist and an admirer of Karl Popper. Their letters were later published. In 1963, Albert received the Social Sciences and General Studies of Methods chair (later named Sociology and Studies of Economics) at Wirtschaftshochschule Mannheim (later University of Mannheim).

1961–1969 was the time of the so-called Positivismusstreit (positivism dispute), the debate between Karl Popper and Theodor W. Adorno concerning positivism within German sociology during the 1960s. Albert participated at this meanwhile famous Tagung der deutschen Gesellschaft für Soziologie (Conference of the German Society of Sociology) in 1961 in Tübingen. In the beginning, there was no dispute on positivism, because both Adorno and Popper were opposed to positivism. The debate was more about the differences between social sciences and natural sciences and the status of values in the social sciences. In 1963, the debate was continued by Jürgen Habermas in the Festschrift für Adorno. In 1964, in the Soziologentag (Conference on Sociology) in Heidelberg, the debate grew into an excited discussion between Habermas and Albert. The dispute culminated in a collection of essays, published in 1969 and translated into several languages. This dispute gained a broad audience.

In 1989, Albert retired from active service as a professor emeritus, but continued writing books and giving lectures at many universities, such as the 1990 lectures at the University of Graz on Critical Rationalism, the 1995 Walter Adolf Lectures at Hochschule St. Gallen, and the 1998 Wittgenstein-Lectures at the University of Bayreuth (with Rainer Hegselmann) about critical rationalism.

=== Personal life ===
Albert lived in Heidelberg with his Austrian wife; they had a son. On 8 February 2021, Hans Albert reached 100 years of age, thus becoming a centenarian.

Albert died in Heidelberg on 24 October 2023, at age 102.

== Work ==
=== Critical rationalism ===
Albert developed Popper's critical rationalism into a concise, broad-ranging maxim, thereby extending it from a method to progress in science to one equally applicable in day-to-day heuristics. To substantiate his approach, he provided evidence for his thesis that there is no field of human activities where one should not be critical. Consequently, he advocated applying critical rationalism to the social sciences, especially to economics, politics, jurisprudence, and religion. In his view, the attitude of criticism is one of the oldest European traditions (going back to the pre-Socratics), in comparison with other less critical traditions.

Before his many books were published, Albert was already known to a broader audience for his contributions to the positivism dispute, arguing against his opponents of the so-called Frankfurt School of Theodor W. Adorno and Max Horkheimer at the Frankfurt Institute of Sociology. His contributions included

- differentiating between critical rationalism and positivism
- arguing against some strains of sociology opposing the application of methods used in natural sciences
- suggesting that the role of values and the scientific handling of values has to be given new thought
- interpreting Max Weber not as supporting value-free science, but as demonstrating that scientists can "be free of any value judgement", even for research in the fields of values.

Albert observed that new insights are often difficult to spread or proliferate. He ascribed this phenomenon's cause to ideological obstacles, for which Albert coined the phrase "immunity against criticism".

Albert's well-known Münchhausen trilemma is ironically named after Baron Munchausen, who allegedly pulled himself out of a swamp seizing himself by his shock of hair. This trilemma rounds off the classical problem of justification in the theory of knowledge. It concludes that all attempts to rationally justify or rather ultimately verify a thesis must inherently fail. This verdict concerns not only deductive justifications, as many of his critics believe, but also inductive, causal, transcendental, and all otherwise structured justifications. As Albert reasoned, they all will be in vain, since a justification inevitably faces one of three flaws:

1. All justification in pursuit of certain knowledge simultaneously has to justify the means of justification or rather the validity of its premises – an effort which leads to an infinite regress.
2. One can cut the chain of reasons short, for instance, by pointing to self-evidence or common sense or fundamental principles or another basic premise that shall not be further questioned. But in doing so the intention to arrive at a universally valid justification is abandoned, because the reasoning cannot be accepted, unless one (irrationally) accepts the validity of one premise for its own sake.
3. The third horn of the trilemma is the equally unsatisfying application of a circular argument.

Albert stressed repeatedly that there is no limitation of the Münchhausen trilemma to deductive conclusions. Hence, Albert pointed out, justification is rendered virtually impossible regardless of the specific content of a thesis, justification is impossible at all. From this notion, Albert drew the conclusion that progress in science can only be achieved by means of falsification rather than inductive verification.

To observe and criticize the endeavors made to escape from the quagmire of certain justification became an instructive part of Hans Albert's philosophy. A prominent example of these efforts is his discussion of the ideas of Karl-Otto Apel, one of Germany's leading philosophers, in his book Transzendentale Träumereien (Transcendental Reveries).

Still, Albert argued that critical rationalists have to accept that those attempts of rigorous justification (like Apel's) are not entirely futile, since only as long as alternative methods are without success can critical rationalism be called successful.

=== Style of writing and criticizing ===
Albert's plea is for critical rationalism. He avoided solemn preaching in favor of serious, serene discussion with people of different faith and thinking. While Popper always warned not to follow one's opponent into the mire, Albert followed them into their favored field of thinking on their own terms. So he criticized Heidegger's "being in the abyss" ("Sein im Ab-Grund"), Gadamer's "horizons melting together", Habermas's "consensual theoretical truth in the ideal discourse", Karl-Otto Apel's transcendental arguments, and the theologian Hans Küng's "absolute-relative, this-life-and-hereafter, transcendental-immanent, allconcerning-allcontrolling most real reality in the very heart of things". Hans Albert meticulously followed their arguments to uncover:

- undiscovered premises
- new and often fatal consequences
- new and often better alternatives.

Underlying suppositions and injunctions of Albert's method are:

- Only if all currently proposed alternatives to critical rationalism are untenable may one live with critical rationalism.
- There is value in keeping an open mind and learning from discussion. Other people may be right; thus give credit to their thinking.
- One should keep away from solemn gravity.
- One should avoid the moralising know-it-all but not conceal one's preferred way of life.

== Awards ==
Albert was honored with the Vits Prize in 1976 and with the Arthur Burckhardt Prize in 1984. He was decorated with the Austrian Ehrenkreuz für Kunst und Wissenschaft der Republik Österreich in 1994 and received honorary doctorates from the universities of Linz (1995), Athens (1997), Kassel (2000), Graz (2006), and Klagenfurt (2007).

- Iron Cross, 2nd class
- Ernst Hellmut Vits Prize, 1976
- Austrian Cross of Honour for Science and Art, 1st class, 1994
- Merit Cross 1st Class of the Federal Republic of Germany (Verdienstkreuz 1. Klasse), 2008

== Publications ==
Albert published around 30 books. Some of them are translated into different languages.

=== English books ===
- 1976 (with Adorno, Dahrendorf, Habermas, Pilot, and Popper): The Positivist Dispute in German Sociology, Heinemann London and Harper Torchbook. Review extracts and
- 1985 Treatise on Critical Reason, Princeton University Press, Princeton.
- 1999 Between Social Science, Religion, and Politics. Essays on Critical Rationalism, Amsterdam-Atlanta (Rodopi). (Description and chapter-preview links.

=== English papers ===
- "Social Science and Moral Philosophy. A Critical Approach to the Value Problem in the Social Sciences", in: Mario Bunge (eds.), The Critical Approach to Science and Philosophy. Essays in Honor of Karl Popper, Glencoe/Illinois.
- Law and State, Vol. 13, Tübingen 1976.
- "Science and the Search for Truth. Critical Rationalism and the Methodology of Science", in: G. Radnitzky/G. Andersson (eds.), Progress and Rationality in Science, Dordrecht/ Holland 1978, Boston Studies in the Philosophy of Science, R.S. Cohen/M. Wartofsky (eds.), Vol LVIII.
- "The Economic Tradition. Economics as a Research Programme for Theoretical Social Science", in: Karl Brunner (ed.), Economics and Social Institutions, Insights from the Conferences on Analysis and Ideology, Boston/The Hague/London 1979.
- "Transcendental Realism and Rational Heuristics: Critical Rationalism and the Problem of Method", in Gunnar Anderson (ed.), Rationality in Science and Politics, Reidel, Dordrecht 1984.
- "On Using Leibniz in Economics. Comment on Peter Koslowski", in: Peter Koslowski (ed.), Economics in Philosophy, Mohr, Tübingen 1985, p. 68–78.
- "Law as an Instrument of Rational Practice", in: Terence Daintith/ Günther Teubner (ed.), Contract and Organization. Legal Analysis in the Light of Economic and Social Theory, Berlin/New York 1986, de Gruyter, p. 25–51.
- "Is Socialism inevitable? Historical prophecy and the possibilities of reason", in: Svetozar Pejovich (ed.), Socialism: Institutional, philosophical and economical issues, Kluwer Academic Publishers, Dordrecht, Boston, Lancaster 1987.
- "Critical Rationalism. The Problem of Method in Social Sciences and Law", Ratio Juris Volume 1, Number 1, March 1988, p. 1–19.
- "Hermeneutics and Economics. A Criticism of Hermeneutical Thinking in the Social Sciences", Kyklos, Volume 41, Fasc. 4, 1988, pages 573–602.
- "Reply to Lord Alford", Newsletter (Editor Fred Eidlin), Vol 3 (No 3 & 4), pages 13–14, July 1988.
- "Some remarks on reasons in explaining human action", International Studies in the Philosophy of Science, Vol. 7 No.1, 1993, pp. 25–27.
- "Religion, Science, and the Myth of the Framework", in: I.C.Jarvie/ N.Laor (eds), Critical Rationalism, Metaphysics and Science. Essays for Joseph Agassi, Vol.I, Kluwer Acad. Publishers, pp. 41–58.
- "Commentary on Bernholz", in: Gerard Radnitzky/ Hardy Bouillon (eds), Values and the Social Order, Vol. I: Values and society, pages 251–254, Avebury, Aldershot/ Brookfield USA/ Hong Kong/ Singapore/ Sidney.
- "The Ideal of Liberty and the Problem of the Social Order", in: Dino Fiorot (ed.), Ordine, Conflitto e Libertà nei Grandi Mutamenti del Nostro Tempo, G. Giappichelli Editore, Torino, pp. 1–30.
- "The Conflict of Science and Religion: Religious Metaphysics and the Scientific World View as Alternatives", Journal of Institutional and Theoretical Economics (JITE), Vol.153 (1), 1997, pp. 216–234.
- "Critical Rationalism and Universal Hermeneutics", in Jeff Malpas, Ulrich Arnswald, Jens Kertscher (ed.), Gadamer's Century. Essays in Honor of Hans-Georg Gadamer (MIT Press, March 2002), pp. 15–24.
- "Historiography as a Hypothetical-Deductive Science: A Criticism of Methodological Historism", in: Colin Cheyne/John Worrall (eds), Rationality and Reality. Conversations with Alan Musgrave, Springer, Dordrecht, pp. 263–272.

=== German books ===
- 1967 Marktsoziologie und Entscheidungslogik. Ökonomische Probleme in soziologischer Perspektive.
- 1968 Traktat über kritische Vernunft Tübingen (Mohr Siebeck), many later editions.
- 1971 Plädoyer für kritischen Rationalismus, Piper Verlag, München 1971.
- 1972 Konstruktion und Kritik. Aufsätze zur Philosophie des kritischen Rationalismus, Verlag Hoffmann und Campe, Hamburg 1972.
- 1973 Theologische Holzwege. Gerhard Ebeling und der rechte Gebrauch der Vernunft, Verlag Mohr (Siebeck), Tübingen 1973.
- 1975 Transzendentale Träumereien. Karl-Otto Apels Sprachspiele und sein hermeneutischer Gott, Verlag Hoffmann und Campe, Hamburg 1975.
- 1976 Aufklärung und Steuerung. Aufsätze zur Sozialphilosophie und zur Wissenschaftslehre der Sozialwissenschaften, Verlag Hoffmann und Campe, Hamburg 1976.
- 1977 Kritische Vernunft und menschliche Praxis with autobiographical notes.
- 1978 Traktat über rationale Praxis.
- 1979 Das Elend der Theologie.
- 1982 Die Wissenschaft und die Fehlbarkeit der Vernunft.
- 1987 Kritik der reinen Erkenntnislehre. Das Erkenntnisproblem in realistischer Perspektive.
- 1993 Lectures about Rechtswissenschaft als Realwissenschaft. Das Recht als soziale Tatsache und die Aufgabe der Jurisprudenz at the University of Würzburg. – Kritik der reinen Hermeneutik – Der Antirealismus und das Problem des Verstehens, Tübingen (Mohr-Siebeck) 1994.
- 1997 Paul Feyerabend, Hans Albert, Briefwechsel (ed. Wilhelm Baum), Frankfurt/M. (Fischer) 1997.
- 2000 Kritischer Rationalismus, Tübingen Mohr-Siebeck (UTB) 2000.
- 2001 Hans Albert Lesebuch, UTB (Mohr Siebeck) Tübingen 2001.
- 2003 Kritik des transzendentalen Denkens, (Mohr Siebeck) Tübingen 2003 and in the same year: Erkenntnislehre und Sozialwissenschaft. Karl Poppers Beiträge zur Analyse sozialer Zusammenhänge, Wien (Picus) 2003.
- 2005 Hans Albert – Karl Popper – Briefwechsel 1958–1994 (Letters from and to Karl Popper); ed. Martin Morgenstern and Robert Zimmer.
- 2006 Rationalität und Existenz (Reprint of Albert's 1952 dissertation with a new foreword and a self-critical epilogue), 233 p., Tübingen (Mohr Siebeck).
- 2007 In Kontroversen verstrickt. Vom Kulturpessimismus zum kritischen Rationalismus, LIT Verlag 2007, 264 pages. (Autobiography)

For Hans Albert's scientific articles, see List of Publications maintained by Hans-Joachim Niemann in . See also the Hans-Joachim Niemann- (alias 'hjn') initiated German Wikibook: Studienführer Hans Albert (Study Guide for Hans Albert). It contains a large list of publications with many quotations from English-written articles, as well as articles translated into Italian, Finnish, Korean, Japanese, Polish, Spanish, and Serbo-Croatian.

=== Autobiographical ===
- Hans Albert, "Autobiographische Einleitung", in: Kritische Vernunft und menschliche Praxis, Stuttgart (Reclam) 1977, pp. 5–33.
- Hans Albert, "Mein Umweg in die Soziologie. Vom Kulturpessimismus zum kritischen Rationalismus", in: Christian Fleck (ed.), Wege zur Soziologie. Autobiographiche Notizen, Leske + Budrich, Opladen, pp. 17–37.
- Hans Albert, In Kontroversen verstrickt. Vom Kulturpessimismus zum kritischen Rationalismus, LIT Verlag 2007, 264 p. (Hans Albert's autobiography)
