= Global justice movement =

Network of organized efforts around international justice

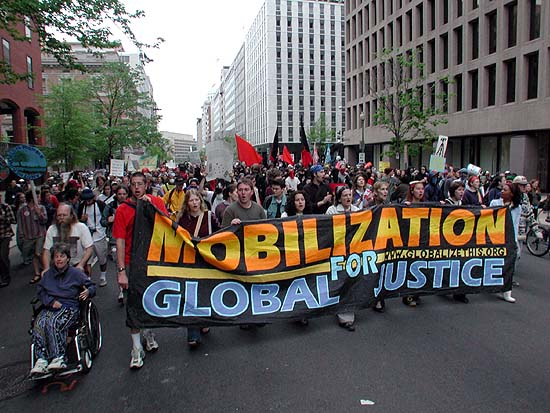
Activists protest policies of the World Bank in Washington, D.C.

The global justice movement is a network of globalized social movements demanding global justice by opposing what is often known as the "corporate globalization" and promoting equal distribution of economic resources.

== Movement of movements ==
The global justice movement describes the loose collections of individuals and groups—often referred to as a "movement of movements"—who advocate fair trade rules and oppose current institutions of global economics such as the World Trade Organization.

The movement is often labeled the anti-globalization movement by the mainstream media. Those involved, however, frequently deny that they are anti-globalization, insisting that they support the globalization of communication and people and oppose only the global expansion of corporate power. The term further indicates an anti-capitalist and universalist perspective on globalization, distinguishing the movement from those opponents of globalization whose politics are based on a conservative defence of national sovereignty. It is, however, argued by some scholars of social movements, that a new concept of justice, alongside some old notions, underlies many critical ideas and practices developed in this movement. S. A. Hamed Hosseini coins this new mode of conceiving justice as accommodative justice and argues that both the unique nature of the movement and the global complexities of the post–Cold War era account for the rise of such a notion. According to him, "this new concept of justice has emerged from many activists’ experiences of and reflections on the complexities of globalization".

Important organizational pillars of the movement are Via Campesina, the family farmers' international; Peoples' Global Action, a loose collection of often youthful groups (NB the apostrophe correctly indicates involvement of peoples, rather than people); Jubilee 2000, the Christian-based movement for relieving international debt; Friends of the Earth, the environmentalist international; and some think-tanks like Focus on the Global South and Third World Network, as well as some large internationalist and transnational trade union organisations. Participants include worldwide student groups, NGOs, trade unions, faith-based and peace groups, and publications such as New Internationalist. A loose coordination of the movement is taking place on the Social Forums. However, although formal power is often situated in the global South, the resources of North-based NGOs give these disproportionate power to often informally marginalize popular organizations from the South.

=== International solidarity ===
The global justice movement claims to place a significant emphasis on transnational solidarity uniting activists in the Global South and Global North. While the World Social Forum is supposed to promote an example of this emphasis, bringing activists together from around the world to focus on shared philosophy and campaigning, others, like South African politician Andile Mngxitama see the World Social Forum as mostly dominated by Northern NGOs, donors and activists, and argue that Southern representation is largely organized via Northern donors and their NGOs. Mngxitama also expressed that popular organizations in the global South are systematically marginalized or included in a deeply subordinated manner. For this reason, many grassroots movements in the South boycott the forum and the NGOs that gate-keep representation at the forum or, in some instance, actively oppose it as just one more space of domination.

== See also ==
- 1999 Seattle WTO protests
- Alter-globalization
- Anarchism
- Anti-corporate activism
- Anti-globalization
- Anti-imperialism
- Climate justice
- Democratic globalization
- Economic democracy
- Environmental justice
- European Social Forum
- Global citizens movement
- Global justice
- Global Justice (organization)
- Rule of law
- Rule According to Higher Law
