= Global justice =

Issue in political philosophy

Hans von Aachen, Allegory or The Triumph of Justice (1598)

Global justice is an issue in political philosophy arising from the concern about unfairness. It is sometimes understood as a form of internationalism. Global justice and international justice may be distinguished in that the latter is concerned with justice between nations or states whereas the former sees individual human beings as its main concern and seeks "to give an account of what fairness among such agents involves".

== History ==
Norwegian philosopher Henrik Syse claims that global ethics and international justice in the western tradition form part of the tradition of natural law: the topic has been organised and taught within Western culture since Latin times of Middle Stoa and Cicero, and the early Christian philosophers Ambrose and Augustine. Syse states

This early natural-law theorising teaching centred around the idea of a ius naturale, i.e., a system of right which is natural and as such common to all people, available to humankind as a measuring stick of right and wrong.

== Context ==
Per the American political scientist Iris Marion Young "A widely accepted philosophical view continues to hold that the scope of obligations of justice is defined by membership in a common political community. On this account, people have obligations of justice only to other people with whom they live together under a common constitution, or whom they recognize as belonging to the same nation as themselves." English philosopher David Miller agreed, that obligations only apply to people living together or that are part of the same nation.

What we owe one another in the global context is one of the questions the global justice concept seeks to answer. There are positive and negative duties which may be in conflict with one's moral rules. Cosmopolitans, reportedly including the ancient Greek Diogenes of Sinope, have described themselves as citizens of the world. William Godwin (utilitarian thinker and anarchist) argued that everyone has an impartial duty to do the most good he or she can, without preference for any one human being over another.

The broader political context of the debate is the longstanding conflict between local institutions: tribes against states, villages against cities, local communities against empires, or nation-states against the UN. The relative strength of the local versus the global has decreased over recorded history. From the early modern period until the twentieth century, the preeminent political institution was the state, which is sovereign, territorial, claims a monopoly on the legitimate use of violence in its territory, and exists in an international system of other sovereign states. Over the same period political philosophers' interest in justice focused almost exclusively on domestic issues: how should states treat their subjects, and what do fellow-citizens owe one another? Justice in relations between states, and between individuals across state borders was put aside as a secondary issue or left to international relations theorists.

Since the First World War, however, the state system has been transformed by globalization and by the creation of supranational political and economic institutions such as the League of Nations, the United Nations, and the World Bank. Over the same period, and especially since the 1970s, global justice became a more prominent issue in political philosophy. In the contemporary global justice debate, the general issue of impartiality centres on the moral significance of borders and of shared citizenship.

== Central questions ==
Three related questions, concerning the scope of justice, justice in the distribution of wealth and other goods, and the institutions responsible for justice, are central to the problem of global justice. When these questions are addressed in non-ideal circumstances, they are part of the "ethics of process", a branch of political ethics.

=== Scope ===
Are there, as the moral universalist argues, objective ethical standards that apply to all humans regardless of culture, race, gender, religion, nationality or other distinguishing features? Or do ethical standards only apply within such limited contexts as cultures, nations, communities, or voluntary associations?

A Moral Conception of Social Justice is only Universalistic if:

- It subjects all persons to the same system of fundamental moral principles
- These principles assign the same fundamental moral benefits and burdens to all: and
- These fundamental benefits and burdens do not privilege or disadvantage certain groups arbitrarily.

=== Distributive equality ===
Gillian Brock asks "Do we have an obligation to ensure people have their basic needs met and can otherwise lead 'decent' lives, or should we be more concerned with global socio-economic equality?". 1.1 billion people—18% of humanity—live below the World Bank's $2/day. Is this distribution of wealth and other goods just? What is the root cause of poverty, and are there systemic injustices in the world economy? John Rawls has said that international obligations are between states as long as "states meet a minimal condition of decency" where as Thomas Nagel argues that obligations to the others are on an individual level and that moral reasons for restraint do not need to be satisfied for an individual to deserve equal treatment internationally. Peter Singer argues in "Famine, Affluence, and Morality" that the rich have a moral obligation to give their money away to those who need it.

=== Institutions ===
What institutions—states, communes, federal entities, global financial institutions like the World Bank, international NGOs, multinational corporations, international courts, a world state—would best achieve the ideal of global justice? How might they gain our support, and whose responsibility is it to create and sustain such institutions? How free should movement between the jurisdictions of different territorial entities be?

Thomas Pogge says that states cannot achieve global justice by themselves: "It has never been plausible that the interests of states — that is, the interests of governments — should furnish the only considerations that are morally relevant in international relations." Organizations like the World Trade Organization have advocated free trade but allow protectionism in affluent developed countries to this point according to Pogge and Moellendorf.

Public polls have shown that there is support for the International Criminal Court. 130 Civil Society groups in Africa have recognized that the ICC operates unevenly but in the interest of reaching global justice remain supportive of it. In Cambodia the Extraordinary Chambers in the Courts of Cambodia, some observers had said "the court will not truly be effective unless it can properly address the crucial issue of how reparations will be given to victims of the regime" while others supported it, "I think the case is going to be the most important trial in Cambodian history." said Youk Chhang the director of the Documentation Centre of Cambodia, One worldwide institution, the Intergovernmental Panel on Climate Change, responsible for creating agreements on climate change has been criticized for not acting fast enough. Anne Petermann and Orin Langelle of the Global Justice Ecology Project have stated that in 2007 industry insiders were given preferential treatment over "civil society observers and delegates from poorer countries whose visas were delayed."

=== Minimum criteria ===
Thomas Pogge has contended that an "institutional order can not be just if it fails to meet the minimal human rights standard". That standard is based on the Universal Declaration of Human Rights. Mathias Risse has argued that an injustice is not present "While indeed 1.2 billion people in 1998 lived below the poverty line of $1.08 PPP 1993 per day, it is also true that there is now less misery than ever before," Less Misery is his standard for justice. He wrote in 2005, that "progress made over the last 200 years is miraculous".

== Main positions ==
Five main positions—realism, particularism, nationalism, the society of states tradition, and cosmopolitanism (in two forms)—have been taken by contributors to the global justice debate.

=== Realism ===
Realists, such as Charles Yeo, Hashim Tilab argue that there are no global ethical standards, and that to imagine that there are is a dangerous fantasy. States are the main actors in an international anarchy, and they either will or should always attempt to act rationally in their own interests. So, in response to the three central questions above: moral universalism is either false, or merely says that nothing is forbidden to any state in pursuit of its interests. There is no obligation to help the poor, unless doing so helps to further a state's strategic aims. And the state system is taken as the fundamental and unchallengeable global institutional arrangement. The theoretical roots for this realist view are found in the tradition including Machiavelli and extending back to Glaucon's challenge to Socrates. On this approach, relations between states exist in what Charles Beitz describes as a Hobbesian state of nature, and the approach is realist in the sense that it advocates viewing states as they "really are", rather than portraying them in idealistic circumstances or according to their purported ideals.

=== Particularism ===
Particularists, such as Michael Walzer and James Tully, argue that ethical standards arise out of shared meanings and practices, which are created and sustained by discrete cultures or societies. Moral and social criticism is possible within the boundaries of such groups, but not across them. If a society is egalitarian, for instance, its citizens can be morally wrong, and can meaningfully criticise each other, if they do not live up to their own egalitarian ideals; but they cannot meaningfully criticise another, caste-based society in the name of those ideals. "A given society is just if its substantive life is lived in a certain way—that is, in a way faithful to the shared understandings of [its] members." It is unjust if not. Each society has its own, different standards, and only those inside it are bound by those standards and can properly criticise themselves. So, moral universalism is false, because objective ethical standards vary between cultures or societies. We should not apply the same criteria of distributive justice to strangers as we would to compatriots. Nation-states that express their peoples' shared and distinctive ethical understandings are the proper institutions to enable local and different justices.

For Charles Blattberg, however, there exists a particularist approach to global justice, one based upon what he calls a "global patriotism".

=== Nationalism ===
Nationalists, such as David Miller and Yael Tamir, argue that demanding mutual obligations are created by a particular kind of valuable association, the nation. We may have humanitarian duties to aid the particularly badly off worldwide, but these are much less stringent and pressing than our duties to our fellow-citizens. Nationalism has traditionally included this assumption of differing moral obligations to those within and those outside the nation, reflected for example in the fact that the benefits of the welfare state are not available to citizens of other countries. So, moral universalism is too simple, because the ethical standards that apply between compatriots differ from those that apply between strangers (although some nationalists argue for the universal ethical standard that nations should have their own states). Distributive justice is an issue within nations but not necessarily between them. And a world-system of nation-states is the appropriate organiser of justice for all, in their distinct associational groups.

=== Society of states ===
In the society of states tradition, states are seen as individual entities that can mutually agree on common interests and rules of interaction, including moral rules, in much the same way as human individuals can. Often, this idea of agreement between peers is formalised by a social contract argument.

One prominent exemplar of the tradition is John Rawls. In The Law of Peoples, Rawls extends the method of his A Theory of Justice to the question of global justice. His argument is that we can justify a global regime by showing that it would be chosen by representatives of Peoples in an imagined original position, which prevents them knowing which particular People they represent. This decision-in-ignorance models fairness because it excludes selfish bias. When Rawls applied this method in the case of domestic justice, with parties in the original position representing individual members of a single society, he argued that it supported a redistributive, egalitarian liberal politics. In contrast, Rawls argues that when his method is applied to global justice, it supports a quite traditional, Kantian international ethics: duties of states to obey treaties and strict limits on warmaking, but no global repossession of private property. So, different justices apply to the domestic and international cases. Even if justice requires egalitarianism within states, it does not do so between them. And a system of cooperating but independent states is the just global institutional arrangement. Rawls describes this ideal as a 'realistic utopia'. Apart from Rawls, other notable exponents of this position include Hedley Bull.

=== Cosmopolitanism ===
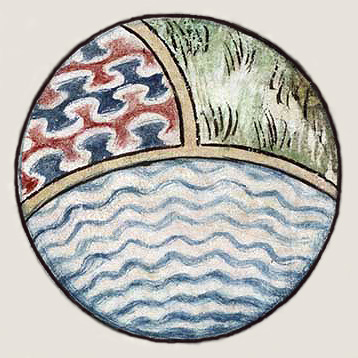
John Gower, Vox Clamantis detail (c. 1400): the world

Cosmopolitans argue that some form of moral universalism is true, and therefore that all humans, and not merely compatriots or fellow-citizens, fall within the scope of justice. Their arguments typically appeal to consistency, as follows:

1. The moral standing of individuals is based on some morally significant characteristics.
2. These characteristics are shared by all humans (and not only by the members of some nation, culture, society, or state).
3. Therefore, all humans have moral standing (and the boundaries between nations, cultures, societies and states are morally irrelevant).

Cosmopolitans differ, however, over which shared human characteristics are morally significant.

Consequentialist cosmopolitans, amongst whom Peter Singer is prominent, argue that the proper standard of moral judgement for actions, practices or institutions is their consequences, and that the measure of consequences is the welfare of humans (or even of all sentient creatures). The capacity to experience welfare and suffering is therefore the shared basis for moral standing. This means that the fact that some people are suffering terrible deprivations of welfare, caused by poverty, creates a moral demand that anyone who is able to help them do so. Neither the physical distance between the rich and the poor, nor the fact that they are typically citizens of different countries, has any moral relevance.

Human rights defenders of cosmopolitanism, such as Thomas Pogge and Simon Caney, argue that all humans have rights, perhaps those set out in the UN's Universal Declaration of Human Rights. It may be argued that these rights create a positive duty of the rich to provide what they guarantee (security, a livelihood, etc.); or, alternatively, it may be argued that the rich are currently violating their negative duty not to impose a global order that systematically violates rights of the poor.

Others defend neoconservative interventionist foreign policy from a view of cosmopolitanism for the added benefits to human rights that such intervention could bring. Some defended the 2003 invasion of Iraq from this motive due to the human rights abuses Saddam had inflicted on countless members of the Kurdish and Shiite communities.

Individual cosmopolitans also differ considerably in how they understand the requirements of distributive justice and the legitimacy of global institutions. Some, for instance Kai Nielsen, endorse world government; others, such as Simon Caney, do not. The extent to which cosmopolitans advocate global redistribution of resources also varies. For instance, Charles Beitz would seek to address resource inequalities through extending the Rawlsian difference principle globally to advantage those least well off in the world, although the resources he would redistribute are natural resources rather than the broader category of societal goods (including such matters as talent). All cosmopolitans, however, believe that individuals, and not states, nations, or other groups, are the ultimate focus of universal moral standards.

== Demands ==
None of the five main positions described above implies complete satisfaction with the current world order. Realists complain that states that pursue utopian moral visions through intervention and humanitarian aid, instead of minding their own strategic interests, do their subjects harm and destabilise the international system. Particularists object to the destruction of traditional cultures by cultural colonialism, whether under the guise of economic liberalism or defence of human rights. Nationalists deplore the fact that so many people are stateless or live under inefficient or tyrannical regimes. Advocates of the society of states are concerned about rogue states and the imperial ambitions of the powerful. Cosmopolitans believe that the contemporary world fails to live up to their moral standards, and that doing so would require considerable changes in the actions of wealthy individuals and states.

== See also ==
- Alter-globalization – Advocacy for globalization models prioritizing human rights, environment, and fairness
- Anti-globalization – Worldwide political movement against multinational corporations
- Cosmopolitanism – Idea that all humans are part of one community
- Democratic globalization – Social movement towards global democracy
- European Social Forum – Recurring alter-globalization conference
- Global citizenship – Idea that all people have rights and responsibilities from being a member of the world
- Global civics – Global approach to civics
- Global Justice (organization)
- Global justice movement – Network of organized efforts around international justice
- Global Justice Now – Non-governmental organization
- Global studies – Study of global macro-processes
- Human rights defender – Person who acts to protect human rights
- International law – Norms in international relations
- Just War – Doctrine about when a war is ethically just
- Movement of Movements
- Per Fugelli – Norwegian physician (1943–2017)
- Rule According to Higher Law – Belief that universal principles of morality override unjust laws
- Rule of law – Political situation in which everyone is subject to the law
- Social justice – Concept in political philosophy
- Theodicy – Theological attempt to resolve the problem of evil
- World Social Forum – Social movement organization
- Xenocentrism – Preference for the cultural practices of societies other than one's own
