= David Miller (philosopher) =

English philosopher (1942–2024)

David William Miller (19 August 1942 in Watford – 20 November 2024) was an English philosopher and prominent exponent of critical rationalism. He taught in the Department of Philosophy at the University of Warwick in Coventry, UK, where he was a Reader in Philosophy. He had been an Honorary Treasurer of the British Society for the Philosophy of Science.

He was educated at Woodbridge School and Peterhouse, Cambridge. In 1964 he began to study logic and scientific method at the London School of Economics. Soon afterwards he became one of Karl Popper's research assistants. In a series of papers in the 1970s, Miller and others uncovered defects in Popper's formal definition of verisimilitude, previously a mostly ignored aspect of Popper's theory. A substantial literature developed in the two decades following, including papers by Miller, to assess the remediability of Popper's approach.

Miller's Critical Rationalism: A Restatement and Defence is an attempt to expound, defend, and extend an approach to scientific knowledge identified with Popper. A central, "not quite original", thesis is that rationality does not depend on good reasons. Rather, it is better off without them, especially as they are unobtainable and unusable.

== Books by David Miller ==
- Croquet and How to Play It with Rupert Thorp, 1966
- Popper Selections, 1985
- Critical Rationalism: A Restatement and Defence, 1994
- Out of Error: Further Essays on Critical Rationalism, 2006

== See also ==
- William Warren Bartley
- Hans Albert
