= Global Justice (organization) =

American advocacy group

Students march with Global Justice.

Global Justice is a US-based non-governmental organization, founded in 2001 at Harvard University by undergraduate and graduate students. With several different issue campaigns, the organization has chapters on over 15 high school and college campuses across the country.

== Mission ==
Global Justice's mission is to mobilize students and youth to be activists for a particular form of economic and social justice. According to its mission statement, "We produce an immediate impact by promoting policies that strengthen global communities, and long-term change by empowering young people to become global justice activists for life. We achieve these goals through student owned and led campaigns, leadership development, advocacy, and education."

== History and campaigns ==
Global Justice is based on student-driven, grassroots campaigns aimed to change the policies of governments and corporations. The Student Global AIDS Campaign (SGAC) was founded in 2001 with the goal of mobilizing a more effective and coordinated global response to the crisis of HIV/AIDS. The second campaign of Global Justice, the Student Campaign for Child Survival (SCCS), was founded in 2002 to focus international attention on the over 10 million children under five who die annually from preventable infectious diseases. A final campaign, the Student Trade Justice Campaign, is focused on changing international trade rules to promote workers' rights, preserve farmers' livelihoods, and widen access to lifesaving medicines.

== Major events and successes ==
The organization uses education, media work, and protest and has won several major victories since its foundation. Highlights include:

- Global Fund Advocacy: Members of the SGAC and SCCS campaigns have been involved for years in pushing for increased US funding for the Global Fund to fight AIDS, TB, and Malaria, which rose to over $100million in 2005.
- "Kick Coke Off Campus": Global Justice's SGAC joined with other AIDS activists to pressure Coca-Cola to treat HIV+ workers in its African bottling plants.
- 04.Stop.AIDS: a loose network of HIV and AIDS activists, many of them SGACers, who went to presidential candidates events and asked pointed questions until every democratic candidate adopted a progressive platform on global AIDS (President George W. Bush refused to talk with the activists or allow them into events).
- Student March Against AIDS: on February 26, 2005, Global Justice's SGAC held the second largest HIV and AIDS mobilization in U.S. history. More than 4,000 students and young people from around the country rallied in DC for the Student March Against AIDS.
- SACU & CAFTA: in 2006, Global Justice's STJC was involved in opposing the Free Trade Agreement with Southern Africa, which was put on hold, and before that in opposing CAFTA, which did go through.
- Gilead Sciences Corporate Campaign: in spring 2006, SGAC took on its second corporate campaign, this time targeting the marketers of second-line AIDS drugs who had failed to make those medicines accessible to lower and middle income countries. The company Gilead Sciences eventually made major concessions to make its drug Tenofovir more available and allow generic competition.

== See also ==
- Anti-globalization
- Alter-globalization
- Democratic globalization
- Global Citizens Movement
- Global justice
- Global Justice Movement
- Movement of Movements
- World Social Forum | European Social Forum
