= Critical Rationalism =

1994 book by David Miller

Critical Rationalism: A Restatement and Defence
- Cover of the first edition
- Author: David Miller
- Language: English
- Subject: Philosophy of science
- Published: 1994
- Publication place: United States
- Pages: viii, 264 pp.
- OCLC: 94-11205
- LC Class: Q175.M629 1994

Critical Rationalism: A Restatement and Defence (1994) is a book on the philosophy of science by the philosopher David Miller. Book reviews include those of John Watkins in the British Journal for the Philosophy of Science and Michael Redhead in Analytic Philosophy. The book seeks to restate and extend the epistemology of Karl Popper, whose general philosophy has been termed 'critical rationalism'.

The book criticizes the use of "good reasons" in general (including evidence supposed to support the excess content of a hypothesis). He argues that good reasons are neither attainable, nor even desirable. Basically, the case, which Miller calls "tediously familiar", is that all arguments purporting to give valid support for a claim are either circular or question-begging. That is, if one provides a valid deductive argument (an inference from premises to a conclusion) for a given claim, then the content of the claim must already be contained within the premises of the argument (if it is not, then the argument is ampliative and so is invalid). Therefore, the claim is already presupposed by the premises, and is no more "supported" than are the assumptions upon which the claim rests, i.e. begging the question.
