= Structural violence =

Form of violence

Structural violence is a form of violence where in some social structure or social institution may harm people by preventing them from meeting their basic needs or rights.

The term was coined by Norwegian sociologist Johan Galtung, who introduced it in his 1969 article "Violence, Peace, and Peace Research". Some examples of structural violence as proposed by Galtung include institutionalized racism, sexism, and classism, among others. Structural violence and direct violence are said to be highly interdependent, including family violence, gender violence, hate crimes, racial violence, police violence, state violence, terrorism, and war. It is very closely linked to social injustice insofar as it affects people differently in various social structures.

== Definitions ==
=== Galtung ===
According to Johan Galtung, rather than conveying a physical image, structural violence is an "avoidable impairment of fundamental human needs."

Galtung contrasts structural violence with "classical violence:" violence that is "direct," characterized by rudimentary, impermanent "bodily destruction" committed by some actor. Galtung places this as the first category of violence. In this sense, the purest form of structural violence can be understood as violence that endures with no particular beginning, and that lacks an 'actor' to have committed it.

Following this, by excluding the requirement of an identifiable actor from the classical definition of violence, Galtung lists poverty (i.e., the "deprival of basic human needs") as the second category of violence and "structurally conditioned poverty" as the first category of structural violence.

Asking why violence necessarily needs to be done to the human body for it to be considered violence—"why not also include violence done to the human mind, psyche or how one wants to express it"—Galtung proceeds to repression (i.e., the "deprival of human rights") as the third category of violence, and "structurally conditioned repression" (or, "repressive intolerance") as the second type of structural violence.

Lastly, Galtung notes that repression need not be violence associated with repressive regimes or declared on particular documents to be human-rights infractions, as "there are other types of damage done to the human mind not included in that particular tradition." From this sense, he categorizes alienation (i.e., "deprival of higher needs") as the fourth type of violence, leading to the third kind of structural violence, "structurally conditioned alienation"—or, "repressive tolerance," in that it is repressive but also compatible with repression, a lower level of structural violence.

Since structural violence is avoidable, he argues, structural violence is a high cause of premature death and unnecessary disability.

Some examples of structural violence as proposed by Galtung include institutionalized adultism, ageism, classism, elitism, ethnocentrism, nationalism, racism, sexism, and speciesism. Structural violence and direct violence are said to be highly interdependent, including family violence, gender violence, hate crimes, racial violence, police violence, state violence, terrorism, and war.

=== Others ===
In his book Violence: Reflections on a National Epidemic, James Gilligan defines structural violence as "the increased rates of death and disability suffered by those who occupy the bottom rungs of society, as contrasted with the relatively lower death rates experienced by those who are above them." Gilligan largely describes these "excess deaths" as "non-natural" and attributes them to the stress, shame, discrimination, and denigration that results from lower status. He draws on Richard Sennett and Jonathan Cobb (i.e., The Hidden Injuries of Class, 1973), who examine the "contest for dignity" in a context of dramatic inequality.

In her interdisciplinary textbook on violence, Bandy X. Lee wrote "Structural violence refers to the avoidable limitations that society places on groups of people that constrain them from meeting their basic needs and achieving the quality of life that would otherwise be possible. These limitations, which can be political, economic, religious, cultural, or legal in nature, usually originate in institutions that exercise power over particular subjects." She goes on to say that "[it] is therefore an illustration of a power system wherein social structures or institutions cause harm to people in a way that results in maldevelopment and other deprivations."

Rather than the term being called social injustice or oppression, there is an advocacy for it to be called violence because this phenomenon comes from, and can be corrected by, human decisions, rather than just natural causes.

The concept of structural violence was extended to the digital realm by Sibai, Luedicke and de Valck (2024), who explained that structural violence can also take place in online communities. The possibility of structural violence might be questioned on the basis that it leaves those affected “with no alternatives” (Galtung 1969, 178). After all, member can leave toxic online communities and social media more generally at any time. Yet, the authors demonstrate that, for many, the friendships, intimacy, and sense of family gained on social media are emotionally significant, making it incredibly difficult for users to leave. In particular they identify three prevalent forms of structural violence in online communities and on social media: hedonic darwinism, a relational contract that facilitates the exploitation of some members for the amusement of others, clan tyranny, where higher-status users abuse their superior influence to prevent other groups from gaining recognition, authority, and voice, and minarchy, a relational structure marked by ultraminimal intervention from governors.

== Forms ==
=== Cultural violence ===
Cultural violence refers to aspects of a culture that can be used to justify or legitimize direct or structural violence, and may be exemplified by religion & ideology, language & art, and empirical science & formal science.

Cultural violence makes both direct and structural violence look or feel 'right', or at least not wrong, according to Galtung. The study of cultural violence highlights the ways the act of direct violence and the fact of structural violence are legitimized and thus made acceptable in society. Galtung explains that one mechanism of cultural violence is to change the "moral color" of an act from "red/wrong" to "green/right," or at least to "yellow/acceptable."

=== Institutional violence ===
Institutional violence is a form of structural violence in which organizations employ attitudes, beliefs, practices, and policies to marginalize or exploit vulnerable groups. Rossiter and Rinaldi (2018) argue that the structural elements manifest as organizational traits that enable the reconstruction of one's sense of inhumane behavior (e.g., moral justification), its deleterious effects (e.g., minimizing), the responsibility for its impact (e.g., denial), and the subject harmed (e.g., dehumanization), which leads to moral abdication and thus create an ethos of violence. One example of such traits highlighted by the authors is the social or physical distance between organizations and the broader society, which serves as a key mechanism in sustaining such violence.

== Cause and effects ==
In The Sources of Social Power (1986), Michael Mann makes the argument that within state formation, "increased organizational power is a trade-off, whereby the individual obtains more security and food in exchange for his or her freedom."

Siniša Malešević elaborates on Mann's argument: "Mann's point needs extending to cover all social organizations, not just the state. The early chiefdoms were not states, obviously; still, they were established on a similar basis—an inversely proportional relationship between security and resources, on the one hand, and liberty, on the other." This means that, although those who live in organized, centralized social systems are not likely subject to hunger or to die in an animal attack, they are likely to engage in organized violence, which could include war. These structures make for opportunities and advances that humans could not create for themselves, including the development of agriculture, technology, philosophy, science, and art; however, these structures take tolls elsewhere, making them both productive and detrimental. In early human history, hunter-gatherer groups used organizational power to acquire more resources and produce more food; yet, at the same time, this power was also used to dominate, kill, and enslave other groups in order to expand territory and supplies.

Although structural violence is said to be invisible, it has a number of influences that shape it. These include identifiable institutions, relationships, social phenomenon, and ideologies, including discriminatory laws, gender inequality, and racism. Moreover, this does not solely exist for those of lower classes, though the effects are much heavier on them, including higher rates of disease and death, unemployment, homelessness, lack of education, powerlessness, and shared fate of miseries. The whole social order is affected by social power; other, higher-class groups, however have much more indirect effects on them, with the acts generally being less violent.

Due to social and economic structures in place today—specifically divisions into rich and poor, powerful and weak, and superior and inferior—the excess premature death rate is between 10 and 20 million per year, which is over ten times the death rates from suicide, homicide, and warfare combined.

The work of Yale-based German philosopher Thomas Pogge is one major resource on the connection between structural violence and poverty, especially his book World Poverty and Human Rights (2002).

=== Access to health care ===
Structural violence affects the availability of health care insofar as paying attention to broad social forces (racism, gender inequality, classism, etc.) can determine who falls ill and who will be given access to care. It is therefore considered more likely for structural violence to occur in areas where biosocial methods are neglected in a country's health care system. Since situations of structural violence are viewed primarily as biological consequences, it neglects problems stimulated by people's environment, such as negative social behaviours or the prominence of inequality, therefore ineffectively addressing the issue.

Medical anthropologist Paul Farmer argues that the major flaw in the dominant model of medical care in the US is that medical services are sold as a commodity, remaining only available to those who can afford them. As medical professionals are not trained to understand the social forces behind disease, nor are they trained to deal with or alter them, they consequently have to ignore the social determinants that alter access to care. As a result, medical interventions are significantly less effective in low-income areas. Similarly, many areas and even countries cannot afford to stop the harmful cycle of structural violence.

The lack of training has, for example, had a significant impact on diagnosis and treatment of AIDS in the United States. A 1994 study by Moore et al. found that black Americans had a significantly lesser chance of receiving treatment than white Americans. Findings from another study suggest that the increased rate of workplace injury among undocumented Latino immigrants in the United States can also be understood as an example of structural violence.

If biosocial understandings are forsaken when considering communicable diseases such as HIV, for example, prevention methods and treatment practices become inadequate and unsustainable for populations. Farmer therefore also states that structural forces account for most if not all epidemic diseases.

Structural violence also exists in the area of mental health, where systems ignore the lived experiences of patients when making decisions about services and funding without consulting with the ill, including those who are illiterate, cannot access computers, do not speak the dominant language, are homeless, are too unwell to fill out long formal surveys, or are in locked psychiatric and forensic wards. Structural violence is also apparent when consumers in developed countries die from preventable diseases 15–25 years earlier than those without a lived experience of mental health.

==== Solutions ====
Farmer ultimately claims that "structural interventions" are one possible solution to such violence. However, for structural interventions to be successful, medical professionals need to be capable of executing such tasks; as stated above, though, many professionals are not trained to do so. Medical professionals still continue to operate with a focus on individual lifestyle factors rather than general socio-economic, cultural, and environmental conditions. This paradigm is considered by Farmer to obscure the structural impediments to changes because it tends to avoid the root causes that should be focused on instead.

Moreover, medical professionals can rightly note that structural interventions are not their job, and as result, continue to operate under conventional clinical intervention. Therefore, the onus falls more on political and other experts to implement such structural changes. One response is to incorporate medical professionals and to acknowledge that such active structural interventions are necessary to address real public health issues.

Countries such as Haiti and Rwanda, however, have implemented (with positive outcomes) structural interventions, including prohibiting the commodification of the citizen needs (such as health care); ensuring equitable access to effective therapies; and developing social safety nets. Such initiatives increase the social and economic rights of citizens, thus decreasing structural violence.

The successful examples of structural interventions in these countries have shown to be fundamental.

Although the interventions have enormous influence on economical and political aspects of international bodies, more interventions are needed to improve access.

Although health disparities resulting from social inequalities are possible to reduce, as long as health care is exchanged as a commodity, those without the power to purchase it will have less access to it. Biosocial research should therefore be the main focus, while sociology can better explain the origin and spread of infectious diseases, such as HIV or AIDS. For instance, research shows that the risk of HIV is highly affected by one's behavior and habits. As such, despite some structural interventions being able to decrease premature morbidity and mortality, the social and historical determinants of the structural violence cannot be omitted.

== International scope ==
Petra Kelly wrote in her first book, Fighting for Hope (1984):

A third of the 2 Billion people in the developing countries are starving or suffering from malnutrition. Twenty-five percent of their children die before their fifth birthday […] Less than 10 per cent of the 15 million children who died this year had been vaccinated against the six most common and dangerous children's diseases. Vaccination costs £3 per child. But not doing so costs us five million lives a year. These are classic examples of structural violence.

The violence in structural violence is attributed to the specific organizations of society that injure or harm individuals or masses of individuals. In explaining his point of view on how structural violence affects the health of subaltern or marginalized people, medical anthropologist Paul Farmer writes:

Their sickness is a result of structural violence: neither culture nor pure individual will is at fault; rather, historically given (and often economically driven) processes and forces conspire to constrain individual agency. Structural violence is visited upon all those whose social status denies them access to the fruits of scientific and social progress.

This perspective has been continually discussed by Farmer, as well as by Philippe Bourgois and Nancy Scheper-Hughes. Farmer ultimately claims that "structural interventions" are one possible solution to such violence; structural violence is the result of policy and social structures, and change can only be a product of altering the processes that encourage structural violence in the first place.

Theorists argue that structural violence is embedded in the current world system; this form of violence, which is centered on apparently inequitable social arrangements, is not inevitable. Ending the global problem of structural violence will require actions that may seem unfeasible in the short term. To some, this indicates that it may be easier to devote resources to minimizing the harmful impacts of structural violence. Others, such as futurist Wendell Bell, see a need for long-term vision to guide projects for social justice. Many structural violences, such as racism and sexism, have become such a common occurrence in society that they appear almost invisible. Despite this fact, sexism and racism have been the focus of intense cultural and political resistance for many decades. Significant reform has been accomplished, though the project remains incomplete.

Farmer notes that there are three reasons why structural violence is hard to see:

1. Suffering is exoticized—that is, when something/someone is distant or far away, individuals tend to not be affected by it. When suffering lacks proximity, it's easy to exoticise.
2. The weight of suffering is also impossible to comprehend. There is simply no way that many individuals are able to comprehend what suffering is like.
3. Lastly, the dynamics and distribution of suffering are still poorly understood.

Anthropologist Seth Holmes studied suffering through the lens of structural violence in his 2013 ethnography Fresh Fruit Broken Bodies: Migrant Farmworkers in the United States. He analyzed the naturalization of physical and mental suffering, violence continuum, and structural vulnerability experienced by Mexican migrants in the U.S. in their everyday lives. Holmes used examples like governmental influences of structural violence—such as how American subsidization of corn industries force Mexican farmers out of business, thereby forcing them to make the very dangerous trip across the border, where the U.S. Border Patrol hinder these migrants' chances of finding work in America, and the impact this all has on the migrants’ bodies.

== Criticism ==
=== Definitional and conceptual criticism ===
Galtung defined violence in terms of the avoidable difference between people's actual and potential realisation, extending the concept beyond direct physical acts to harms arising from social structures. Philosophers have criticised this definition on several grounds. Philosopher Giuliano Pontara argued that it was insufficiently precise because it did not adequately specify what counted as human potential. He further argued that, under Galtung's formulation, discovering a vaccine against cancer could count as an increase in violence because the discovery would raise the level of potential realisation. Since such a discovery would not itself require special justification, Pontara considered this implication inconsistent with the normative adequacy required of a definition of violence. Philosopher C. A. J. Coady also criticised broad, structuralist definitions of violence and defended a more restricted conception. He objected as well to legitimist definitions that incorporate a strong notion of illegitimacy into the meaning of violence.

A related debate concerns the relationship between violence and power. Sociologist Andreas Braun argued that structural violence addresses power (potestas) rather than violence (violentia). Sociologists Peter Imbusch and Lotta Mayer, responding to Braun, argued that competing concepts of violence should not be treated as mutually exclusive alternatives. They called for greater consideration of the phenomena each concept can explain and of whether combining concepts could yield new insights.

=== Explanatory value ===
Economist Kenneth Boulding criticised Galtung's metaphors of structural violence and negative peace as misleading. He argued that the metaphor of structural violence likened poverty, deprivation and ill health to a thug beating and robbing a victim or a conqueror dispossessing a people, although the processes producing and sustaining poverty differ from those producing and sustaining violence. Galtung later identified structural violence as the central point of his continuing disagreement with Boulding.

The explanatory use of structural violence in accounts of disease outbreaks was criticised by anthropologist Katherine Hirschfeld. Examining scholarly accounts of the Ebola outbreak in West Africa and the cholera epidemic in Haiti, she argued that some studies claiming to explain these outbreaks instead relied on what she called "moralistic storytelling", leaving the structural dimensions of health unexplored.

Other criticism has focused on the relationship between social structures and human agency. Peace studies scholar Dong-Ki Lee argued that Galtung's concept ignores the gap between structure and action, observing that structures do not act. He also criticised its focus on abstract structural outcomes rather than the dynamic process and physical experience of violence. Legal scholar Tuba Turan proposed supplementing Galtung's concepts of structural violence, positive peace and peacebuilding with perspectives on agency and social identity. Her approach examines how agents' social identities shape collective beliefs and social practices, potentially contributing to the reproduction or transformation of horizontal inequalities (inequalities among social identity groups) and hierarchical relationships and structures.

=== Political and normative criticism ===
Philosopher C. A. J. Coady observed that structuralist definitions of violence were more commonly associated with the political left, while legitimist definitions were more common on the right. He cautioned, however, that these associations were not necessarily linked.

Political scientist R. J. Rummel argued that Galtung's framework linked structural violence to unrealised human potential, social injustice and inequality, but that the relationships between these concepts were stipulated rather than adequately supported by analysis. He further criticised Galtung for moving from analytical and empirical claims to ethical judgments without prior ethical analysis. Rummel characterised Galtung's conception of positive peace as a socialist theory of peace.

== See also ==
- Accumulation by dispossession
- Communal violence
- Conflict theories
- Cycle of violence
- Economic violence
- Extermination through labour
- Institutional abuse
- Peacebuilding
- Political violence
- Slow violence
- Social murder
- Suicide among LGBTQIA+ people
- Symbolic violence
