= Violence against Women in Benin =

Violence against Women in Benin is a crucial development issue that affects the dignity of women. They can be exercised in all areas of life and affect women from all social categories. These violences are multifaceted and mainly affect women of low social categories. In Benin, nearly 3 out of 5 women are victims of gender-based violence.

== Prevalence ==
The study commissioned by the Ministry of Family of Social Affairs, National Solidarity, the Disabled and the Disabled Elderly people on violence against women at the national level found that: of about 52% of the population that is women, 69% said they had experienced violence at least once in their lives. These victims of GBV are recorded in both community and school settings, in various. forms. According to official statistics, between 2019 and 2022, the majority of acts of violence were directed against women or girls and are characterized by among others, by :

- Psychological or moral violence (19938 cases denounced);
- economic violence (5749 cases denounced);
- property violence (1505 cases denounced);
- sexual violence (1049 cases denounced);
- harassment (613 cases denounced);
- kidnapping (439 cases denounced);
- levirate (340 cases denounced) and incest (61).

=== Sexual violence ===
Many girls have dropped out of school because of sexual violence and the actors for their part are experiencing difficulties in carrying out their psychological, legal and health follow-up.

=== Domestic violence ===
Domestic violence refers to ''any physical or sexual violence done by a person against the person of another when both parties are married, concubine, or consanguineous, or live in the same house''. In 2009, a study notifies that 69% of women say they have suffered at least once physical, psychological or economic violence, when the husband does not give anything for the family.

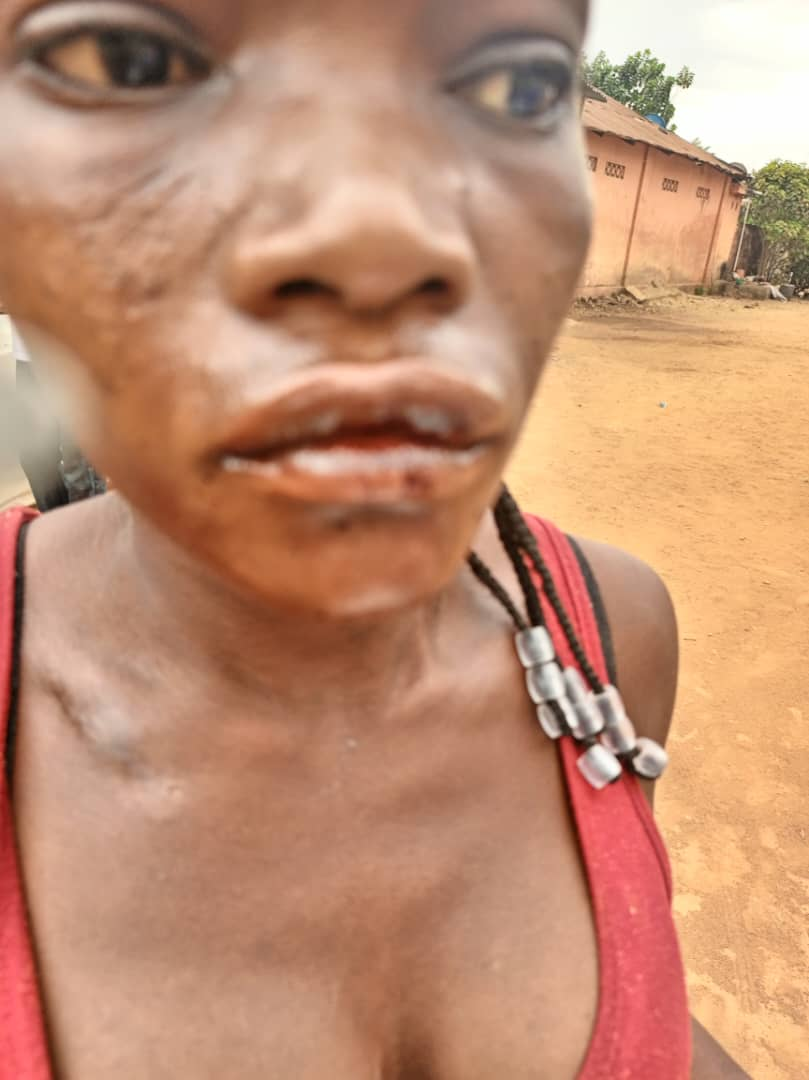
A victim of domestic violence at Porto-Novo

According to a news report, a female victim said: "My husband said that he loved me very much and I believed in him. Despite the fact that he made me suffer by screaming at me all day long and hitting me for the slightest mistake''.

== Legal actions ==
Since 2015, innovations have been implemented for better social protection in Benin. Among other things, there is the establishment of an electronic whistleblowing platform, which has received financial support from UNDP. The Government promulgated Law ''No. 2011-26 of 9 January 2012'' on the prevention and punishment of violence against women. This law constitutes a mechanism for both the fight against and the development and a significant step forward in the legal protection of Beninese women and better appreciation of the principle of gender equality.

In July 2021, the government of President Patrice Talon created the National Women's Institute (INF). The objective is to institutionally strengthen gender-based violence, the fight against all forms of discrimination and violence against women. Also, the Ministry of Social Affairs of Benin launched, in November 2023, 16 days of activism to further popularize the rights of girls and women, to draw everyone's attention to the penalties incurred in the event of violence against a woman or girl.
