= Politics as Usual (book) =

2010 book by Thomas Winfried Menko Pogge

- Author: Thomas Pogge
- Language: English
- Genre: Philosophy
- Publisher: Polity, 2010
- Publication place: United Kingdom
- Media type: Print
- Pages: 224 pages
- ISBN: 978-0745638935
- Preceded by: World Poverty and Human Rights
- Followed by: Are We Violating the Human Rights of the World’s Poor?

Politics as Usual: What Lies Behind the Pro-Poor Rhetoric is a 2010 book by Thomas Pogge. The book is a discussion on issues of global significance and their relationship to poverty. Politics as Usual is based on previously compiled essays. Pogge's book present an alternate view than the one where "Education, health-care, technology, and political participation are becoming ever more universal, empowering human beings everywhere to enjoy security, economic sufficiency, equal citizenship, and a life in dignity." according to Crop. He presents one where Poverty and oppression persist on a massive scale, one where the affluent states and international organizations knowingly contribute and even benefit from these evils.

== Overview ==
Thomas Pogge covers a number of political and philosophical topics including Negative Duties, In World Poverty and Human Rights Pogge had argued that Western states are complicit and in Politics as Usual he expands and analyzes different aspects of Global poverty. The book notes that the bottom half of the world's population has seen its wealth shrink to 1.1%, with global household income shrinking to 3%, during the same period that the top 10% have seen their shares rise to 85.1 and 71.1%, respectively. This is due to the affluent countries having power to formulate policies while the poorest countries must take the blunt of the global repercussions of these policies, according to Pogge. This can change due to people in the affluent countries becoming aware of their effect on worldwide poverty and pressuring their politicians to take action, or at least to "do no harm". He further contends that organizations such as the World Trade Organization have a deeper moral obligation than individuals or governments because they are moral agents of the global poor.

== Content ==
=== War on terror ===
Pogge addresses Islamist terror attacks in New York, London, and Madrid. The attackers may have justified their attacks seeking a greater good but the attacks of innocents failed the greater good test even among the attackers standards. He expands to state that the terrorists were wrong to attack in the name of religion and that the governments are also at fault for the war on terror because they inflict harm upon the innocents without considering the moral implications.

=== International reforms ===
Thomas Pogge contends that we are violating our negative duty not to harm the poor by supporting oppressive regimes which further cements their position. Pogge states that the Universal Declaration of Human Rights gives people specific economic rights and including "Everyone has a right to a standard of living adequate for the health and well-being of himself and his family, including food, clothing, housing and medical care.", which is violated by the international economic system we now have.

== Reviews ==
Ruth Jack of The Kelvingrove Review states that Pogge's argument that world leaders not only allow the status quo to persist but actively and knowingly collude to maintain it for their own ends is not convincing while Pogge's statistical analysis of the depth of world poverty are accurate.

S. Subramanian states that the book makes for painful reading, not because of the author but because of the topic, it states many crimes against humanity, also described as "unimaginable cost of lives as a result of injustices against the poor addressed by his work".
