= Structural vulnerability =

Structural vulnerability is a term used in the fields of medical anthropology and public health to describe how social, economic, and political structures affect how certain individuals and populations have a higher risk of harm and poor health outcomes.. The term was developed through previous studies that focused on structural violence, which explains how social institutions are built in a way that produces social inequalities and therefore leads to some groups having worse health outcomes and death rates than others.. Structural vulnerability is a form of positionality that is shaped by hierarchical social structures and power relations, which limit the opportunities of these individuals and communities and make them more likely to suffer The idea of structural vulnerability has been used to describe populations, like migrants, low-income workers, and marginalized communities, because their position in society has made it harder for them to access important resources like healthcare..

== Definition ==
Structural vulnerability is a form of positionality in society, where some positions have more power than others, which results in certain groups suffering more and having worse health outcomes.. Structural vulnerability in this sense does not put the blame on the individual for making bad choices or being personally weak, instead it is the result of these bigger systems, for example, economic exploitations (e.g. low wages, unstable jobs), political marginalization (e.g. lack of rights), and cultural discrimination (e.g. racism, stigma). Structural vulnerability comes from multiple forces working together. Some of these are class-based inequality, social discrimination, and symbolic violence, which end up reinforcing and normalizing this unequal treatment. Someone is structurally vulnerable when their position in society makes it hard for them to protect themselves, access resources or receive proper healthcare. Structural vulnerability is similar to social determinants of health, but it takes it a step further. Social determinants of health are factors that affect health outcomes. Examples are income, education and working conditions. However, structural vulnerability looks at the bigger systems behind these factors. Some, although not all, of these bigger systems include inequalities, power, and institutions..

== Health Issues ==
When Structural Vulnerability strikes the household poor children are more likely than their affluent peers to encounter a lengthy list of health problems. Potential health issues include inadequate prenatal care, Low birth weight, iron deficiency, and a high risk exposure to toxic metals like lead.

Hunger and Malnutrition can lead to more health issues concerning low income families. Issues could include elevated heart rates, diabetes, hypertension, cancer, asthma, and dental problems. Low income families are less likely to have health insurance, with little or no health insurance lower income families are subject to prolong illnesses.

== Structural vulnerability and epidemiology ==
Structural vulnerability helps epidemiologists understand how diseases are spread, but also why certain groups have less access to care and worse health outcomes. Traditionally, epidemiology looks at individual risk factors (e.g. diet, smoking, behavior), but structural vulnerability focuses on the bigger systems (like racism, immigration laws, healthcare access) to help understand these health outcomes for certain groups.. Medical anthropologists and public health researchers have found that social inequalities affect individuals: they get more sick, get sick faster or die younger. (Farmer). These differences in health outcomes are not accidental, since health follows a social ladder, meaning that the lower someone is in SES, the worse their health tends to be. Structural vulnerability also affects healthcare access, which means that some individuals who are structurally vulnerable are not able to go to a doctor. This is a big problem in epidemiology, since this affects the rate of diseases being detected and reported. Migrant populations, mostly undocumented individuals, often face legal, linguistic, and institutional barriers to healthcare.. A consequence of this is that these migrants end up getting delays in treatment or do not use medical services at all. This directly will result in an underdiagnosis of diseases in epidemiological data.

Because some groups or individuals are missing or underrepresented in healthcare data, there is potential for selection bias in epidemiology and epidemiologists run the risk of making inaccurate conclusions about diseases. These structural vulnerable groups (like migrants or people with a lower SES) are less likely to have access to healthcare or participate in these epidemiologic studies, which means that they are missing from the data. Epidemiologists in turn will make biased estimates of the prevalence of diseases and risks. Structural vulnerability influences how these health outcomes are measured and understood, and does not only shape health outcomes.
