= World Poverty and Human Rights =

Book by Thomas Pogge

- First edition
- Author: Thomas Winfried Menko Pogge
- Published: 2002
- Publisher: Polity Press
- Media type: Print
- Pages: 352
- ISBN: 978-0-7456-4143-0

World Poverty and Human Rights: Cosmopolitan Responsibilities and Reforms is a 2002 book by Thomas Pogge. In the book, Pogge explains that the poorest 44% of humankind have 1.3% of global income and their purchasing power per person per day is less than that of $2.15 in the US in 1993; 826 million of them do not have enough to eat. One-third of all human deaths are from poverty-related causes: 18 million annually, including 12 million children under five.

At the other end of the spectrum, the 15% of humankind in the developed countries have 80% of global income. Pogge argues that shifting 1 or 2% of the wealthy states' share toward poverty eradication is morally compelling. Yet most of the affluent believe that they have no such responsibility and Thomas Pogge's book seeks to explain how this belief is sustained. He analyzes how the "moral and economic theorizing and our global economic order" have adapted to make the wealthy states appear disconnected from mass poverty abroad. Dispelling the illusion, he also offers a normative standard of global economic justice and makes detailed, realistic proposals toward fulfilling it.

Pogge argues that at the cost of two thirds of the US military's expenditures, wealthy states could largely eradicate poverty. The global rich have a duty to eradicate poverty because they have violated the principal of justice not to cause undue harm to others by their coercive global order.
