= Economic violence =

Form of structural violence

Economic violence is a form of structural violence in which specific groups of people are deprived of critical economic resources. Bandy X. Lee, a psychiatrist and scholar on the subject of violence, asserts that such economic impediments are among the "avoidable limitations that society places on groups of people [which] constrain them from meeting their basic needs and achieving the quality of life that would otherwise be possible." As with other forms of structural violence, Lee notes that it is typically inflicted by institutions to the effect of exercising power over vulnerable groups.

Economic violence may also refer to economic abuse, a form of interpersonal domestic violence.

== History ==
The emergence of economic violence as a structural force can be traced to the development of primitive accumulation in medieval Europe. Economists Adam Smith and Karl Marx identified primitive accumulation as the means through which feudal lords and owners of the means of production, such as land, natural resources, or manufacturing equipment, could accumulate wealth by withholding a portion of the profits created by workers who produced goods in the owners' privately owned lands and factories. This enabled owners to stockpile wealth and monopolize the means of production, thus granting them unprecedented control over wealth distribution and the labor force.

The viability of this economic format was contingent upon a labor force which was willing to work for low or poverty-level wages, with the majority of worker profits being returned to the owners of the means of production. To prevent the peasantry from abandoning work and subsisting off the land, a process of commons enclosure ensued across Europe. Scholar Silvia Federici notes that the church, as the single-largest landowner in continental Europe during the 15th century, aligned itself with nobility to privatize lands and criminalize subsistence occupation by peasantries. Federici asserts that these initiatives had three primary objectives: "(a) to create a more disciplined workforce; (b) to defuse social protest; and (c) to fix workers to the jobs forced upon them." Violent enforcement of this economic restructuring process was required to ensure its success, eventually culminating in the Holy Roman Inquisition which purported to wage war on heretics who opposed its social and economic reforms. Without such reforms and the violent mechanisms used to administer them, Federici posits that contemporary forms of growth-oriented capitalism could not have evolved from the bounded economy of feudalism.

== As a structural force ==
Environmental scientist Vandana Shiva stresses the point that economic violence is inherent and essential to the structural integrity of capitalism. She offers contemporary examples of the forms seen in feudal Europe, such as land dispossession in India forcing farmers to abandon subsistence lifestyles for low-paying jobs under inhumane conditions. Shiva notes that these changes are justified by the Indian government and trade entities such as the World Bank through assertions that agriculture has become nonviable due to plummeting crop prices, and the idea that India "must industrialize to [achieve] economic growth." Shiva challenges these claims as specious, arguing that crop prices are low due to the trade reforms themselves, and that Indian farmers are overwhelmingly opposed to being dispossessed of their lands and forced to join the workforce. She notes that land dispossession has been met with fierce resistance, which in turn has led to violent state repression. Examples include the Jaitapur Nuclear Power Project protest in 2011, in which police opened fire on Landless Movement protesters, killing one and critically injuring eight others.

Anthropologist David Harvey cites "considerable evidence that the transition to capitalist development was and continues to be vitally contingent upon the stance of the state." In this sense, he claims that the economic reforms of feudal Europe which enabled its eventual transition to capitalism should not be understood as an isolated historic event, but as a seamless and ongoing process which spread from Europe through global colonial conquest and which continues to assert itself through contemporary neoliberal trade policies, financial entities, and state actors. He notes that infinite growth is a central tenet of capitalism, requiring an infinite supply of natural resources and human labor which must be acquired through violent force and economic coercion of those who may oppose it. He calls this process accumulation by dispossession.

Contemporary examples of structural economic violence include the United States' involvement in regime change in Latin America. Harvey cites the role of the CIA in the violent overthrow of democratically elected Venezuelan president Salvador Allende by General Augusto Pinochet in 1973. According to Harvey, Pinochet was backed by the United States government in an effort to open the socialist government's oil reserves to American markets. This motive is evinced through a CIA cable documented in the State Department archive:

It is firm and continuing policy that Allende be overthrown by a coup... We are to continue to generate maximum pressure toward this end utilizing every appropriate resource. It is imperative that these actions be implemented clandestinely and securely so that the USG and American hand be well hidden.

While economic violence may ultimately be enforced through police, military, or paramilitary action, it is not solely administered through state actors, nor is it restricted to overt physical violence. Financial and industrial interests may be responsible for business practices and policies resulting in corporate wealth aggregation at the expense of the poor, including the oil industry's apparent collusion with state militaries as seen in the CIA's military coup in Venezuela. However, it may also occur without military intervention, such as Monsanto's genetic patenting of agricultural seeds and the lawsuits it instigated globally against farmers whose crops became cross-pollinated by Monsanto products. This resulted in the economic ruin of targeted farmers, with strong evidence of a correlation between these lawsuits and the emergence of widespread farmer suicides in India. Because there is no single entity with explicit control over these events, economic violence may best be understood as a phenomenon which is obfuscated through decentralized initiatives in which powerful actors fundamentally take advantage of preexisting inequalities present in global economic and social hierarchies.

== Relationship to capitalism ==
Economic orthodoxy holds that free markets represent the "will of the people;" that is, prices and production are determined by consumer demand, which in turn is purported to mediate the distribution of material needs with maximum efficiency and what Adam Smith called a "universal opulence which extends itself to the lowest ranks of the people." Central to this theory is the concept of the invisible hand, which Smith claimed would "make nearly the same distributions of the necessaries of life" between rich and poor.

Critics of free market and neoliberal trade practices point to economic indicators suggesting severe wealth disparity between rich and poor in the US, such as the Pew Research Center's findings that the wealth gap between America's rich and poor families more than doubled between 1989 and 2016. Heterodox economist John Munkirs' study of "138 major industries and 5 major market areas" in The Transformation of American Capitalism suggests that "industries are both structurally and functionally interdependent," tracing the development of a "series of economic planning instruments... that both allow and may even necessitate regional, national, and international private sector planning." This would contradict Smith's orthodox understanding of free markets, suggesting instead that markets are governed by financial interests rather than firms responding to the collective will of consumers.

== As invisible violence ==
Political scholar Wendy Brown writes that market rationality has the effect of "disappearing" the agency of its subjects and the credibility of their criticisms. She writes that contemporary liberalism "disavows structural powers of domination--'if women want to be engineers and Latinos want to be philosophers, nothing and no one is stopping them!'" Brown claims such attitudes mask invisible, structural barriers against equality by appealing to technicalities which are decoupled from their contextual realities; i.e., there are no laws preventing women from becoming engineers, but the social and economic barriers faced by women may render the pursuit of an engineering degree socially or financially impossible.

Anthropologist David Graeber asserts that consent to violent economic structures must be contrived through bureaucratic mechanisms which serve to render their causes invisible. According to Graeber, the language of economic rationality "becomes a way of avoiding talking about what the [rationality] is actually for; that is, the ultimately irrational aims that are assumed to be the ultimate ends of human behavior." Economist William M. Dugger suggests that the mystification of economic ideas, such as the "economic rationality" described by Graeber, is deployed by institutions to the effect of confusing individuals' personal interests with the interests of corporate entities. In this way, economic violence may be sanitized by reinterpreting the idea of "the economy" as an impartial force of nature, rather than a series of institutions making conscious policy decisions.

== See also ==
- Class conflict
- Economic abuse
- Economic discrimination
- Structural violence
- Accumulation by dispossession
