= Global resources dividend =

Concept for combating global poverty

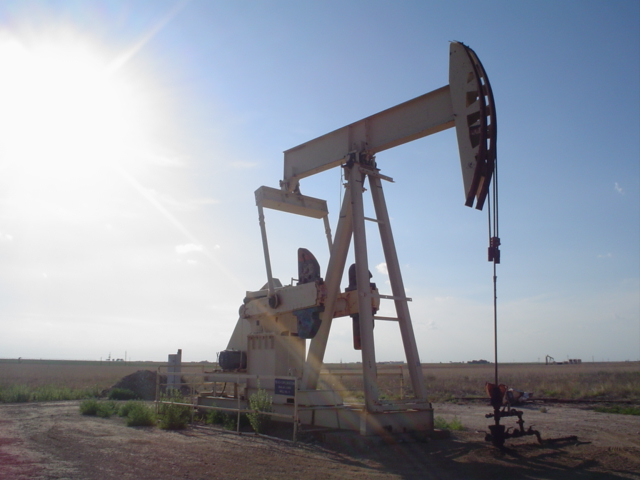
Pogge's global resources dividend (GRD) would tax the extraction of natural resources such as oil to tackle global poverty.

The global resources dividend (GRD) is a method of tackling global poverty advanced from 1994 onwards by the philosopher Thomas Pogge. He presents it as an alternative to the current global economic order. Under the scheme, nations would pay a dividend (tax) on any resources that they use or sell, resulting in a sort of "tax on consumption". Pogge's scheme is motivated by the positive duty to alleviate poverty, but relies especially on his view that the rich have a negative duty not to use institutions that perpetuate economic inequality. Pogge estimates that a dividend of just 1% could raise $300 billion each year; this would equal $250 for each individual in the world's poorest quintile.

Implementing some versions of the GRD entails not only discussions about practicality, but presumably, an affirmation of what is right. As Pogge puts it "Our task as philosophers requires that we try to imagine new, better political structures and different, better moral sentiments. We must be realistic, but not to the point of presenting to the parties in the original position the essentials of the status quo as unalterable facts."

== Rights of the disadvantaged ==
We care deeply about equality, and we would very much like it to be the case that you are not so much worse off than we are. But, unfortunately, it is not realistic to expect that we would actually comply with more egalitarian global institutions. Since no one would benefit from a futile attempt to maintain impracticable institutions, we should all just rest content with the global inequalities of the status quo.

— Thomas Pogge's hypothetical speech to the global poor; he says we should give that speech if we decide that international cooperation is unrealistic, and not worth attempting.

Pogge's main justification is that, even if the idea of GRD would be refined over time, and would be difficult to implement, it is nevertheless the right of those who are the worst off. The 1% dividend tax is not seen as a donation, but a responsibility.

Pogge believes that the idea of the GRD may be a natural extension of John Rawls' theory of justice, although Rawls himself disagreed with this interpretation. To Pogge, the world order currently violates the first principle of justice (equal opportunity), as well as the second principle (equal access to offices, but also the idea that inequalities should favour the poorest individuals). Rawls thought that certain individuals may be permitted to various non-liberal views, provided they harmonize with a liberal government. Similarly, Pogge says that we may permit certain nations to operate according to hierarchical, non-liberal systems; but on a global scale, only systems that harmonize with a grander liberal philosophy can be tolerated. Liberals cannot avoid taking sides completely; they must reject totalitarianism, for instance. This has implications for the validity of actions that might be taken to promote a GRD.

== Pogge's proposal ==
Under the scheme of a GRD, states do not have full property rights in the resources within their sovereign territory. Although the GRD allows states to use resources as they see fit, the scheme implies that the global poor have an 'inalienable stake in all scarce resources' (see implementation, below). Pogge argues that national borders are morally arbitrary in the first place, and are born from a history of coercion and violence. He sets these issues aside, however, and focuses on the following claim: any conception of global justice (even if we accept existing national borders as they are) must acknowledge international inequalities. Pogge thinks it becomes difficult to justify why a person born to rich parents in Canada should be entitled to so much more than one who is born to poor family in Sierra Leone. Equally difficult to justify might be the assumption that every person has a right to absolute control over the resources they happen to have within their borders.

Each nation or "people" would be given full freedom of what to do with their own resources. They would not be required to extract them, or allow others to extract them. If people decide to use a natural resource, they would pay a dividend. This includes oil, but also the various uses of reusable resources (e.g. polluting water). The dividend results in higher costs for natural resources, and thus amounts to a "tax on consumption".

The funds garnered from the GRD would be spent by an international organization, but a world government is not considered necessary for this. The nominated international organization would follow rules established by lawyers, economists, and other professionals from around the world. GRD payments would be used to provide basic rights to developing nations. Governments who collect the funds and invest them in luxuries for their elite would be completely or partially forbidden from receiving them. In such cases, funding NGOs may still be an important way of using the GRD to help the poor.

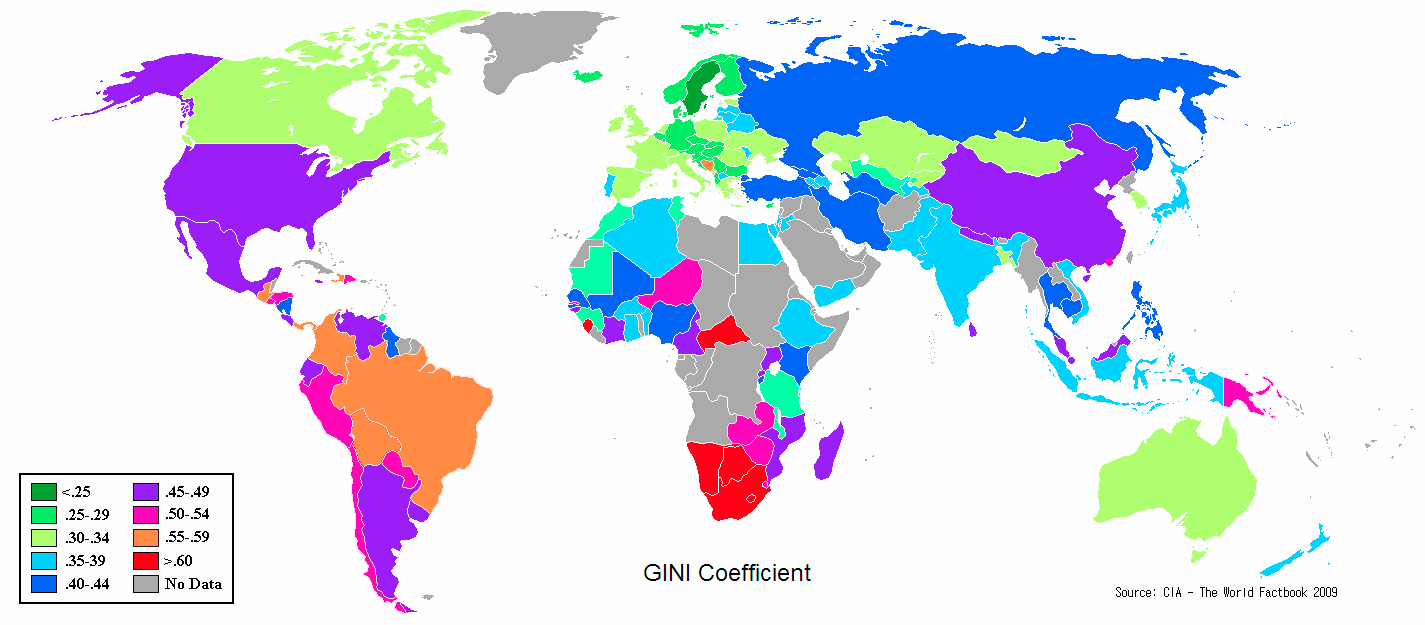
There are different inequalities between, but also (pictured above) within countries. As the system around the GRD becomes more sophisticated, it could accommodate such issues.

The lowest level of the dividend (1%) is still likely to have a big impact on international development goals (e.g. the Millennium Development Goals). Supporters of the global resources dividend argue that it would also have an environmental benefit by reducing demand for non-renewable energy sources.

Pogge imagines that there may be dissent between and within nations. Again, he does not think a world government is necessary. Those countries that fail to pay their required GRD could be taxed by all the other countries doing trade with it. If a majority of countries are paying their GRD, these taxes would help deter dissenters. The idea is that there would be added pressure on each country to enforce the gathering of GRD funds within its borders.

Primary products or 'raw materials' are often refined into more expensive secondary products. As such it can be argued that the GRD is applied too early in the manufacturing process and does not take account of the environmental costs of manufacturing products beyond the extraction of raw materials. As the GRD evolves over time, this could be one of many improvements.

== Criticism ==
Richard Reichel states that it is unlikely that a global resources dividend will work. He argues that increased financial flows could hurt an under developed economy and that an internal distribution with GRD is not resolved.

Tim Hayward presents multiple reasons against the global resources dividend. For one he uses Joseph Heath's argument that the distributive effects could harm the poor nations that are not resource-rich. Hayward states that because Pogge does not include the cultivation of basic commodities because poor people would be under economic pressure to produce cash crops instead of food crops.

Pogge notes also that Thomas Kesselring, Roger Crisp and Dale Jamieson have put forward criticisms of his approach.

== See also ==
- Citizen's dividend
- Consumption tax
- Cosmopolitanism
- Ecotax
- Global justice
- Land value tax
- Pigovian tax
- Severance tax
- Social dividend
- Tobin tax
