= Thomas Pogge =

German philosopher (born 1953)

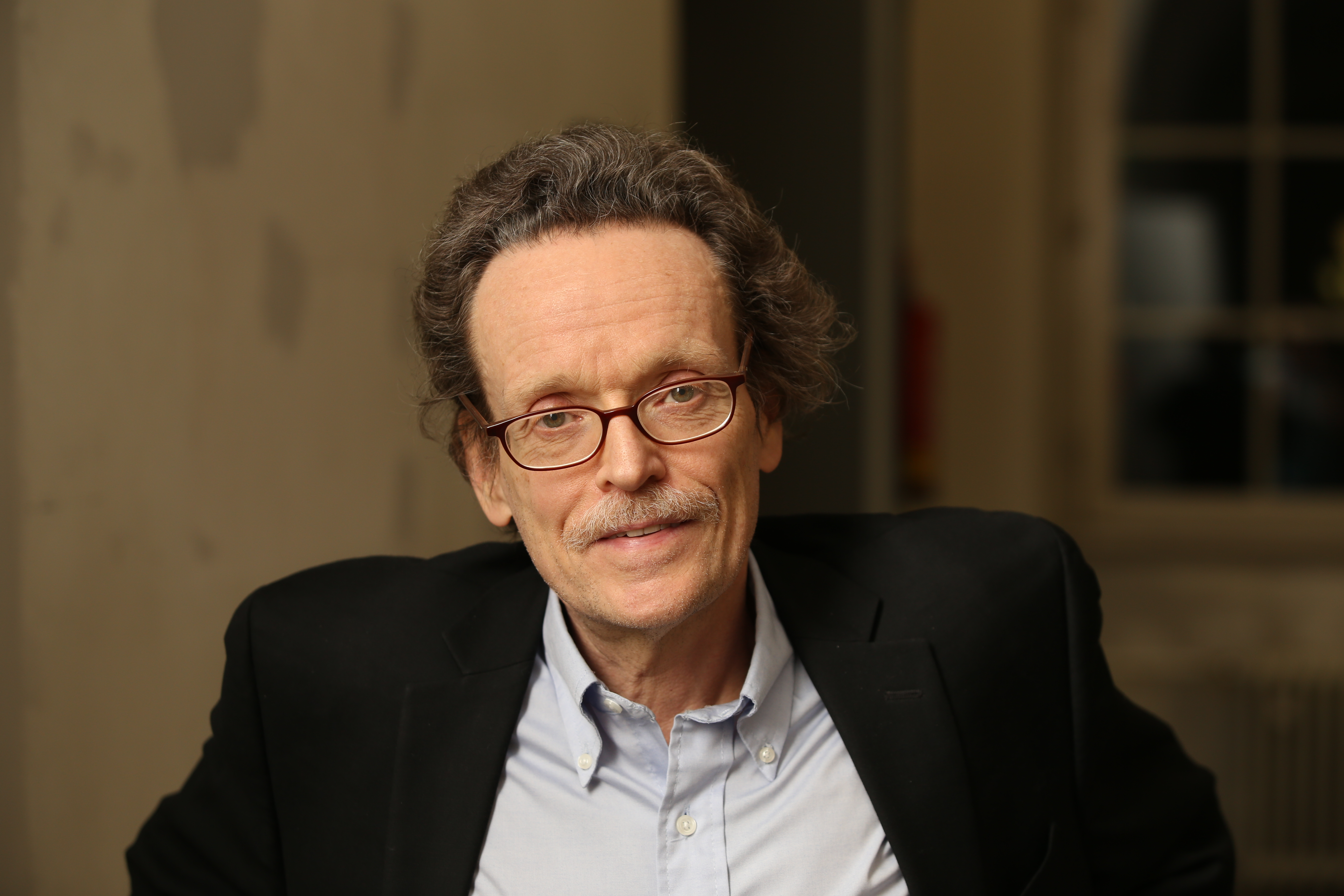
- Pogge in 2014
- Born: Thomas Winfried Menko Pogge; 13 August 1953 (age 73); Poggersdorf, Carinthia, Austria
- Awards: 2013 Gregory Kavka Prize in political philosophy

Education
- Education: Harvard University
- Thesis: Kant, Rawls, and Global Justice (1983)
- Doctoral advisor: John Rawls

Philosophical work
- Era: Contemporary philosophy
- Region: Western philosophy
- School: Analytic
- Institutions: Yale University; Columbia University
- Main interests: Political philosophy
- Notable works: Realizing Rawls
- Website: Yale University

Thomas Winfried Menko Pogge (/ˈpɒɡi/; born 13 August 1953) is a German philosopher and is the Director of the Global Justice Program and Leitner Professor of Philosophy and International Affairs at Yale University, United States. In addition to his Yale appointment, he is the Research Director of the Centre for the Study of the Mind in Nature at the University of Oslo, Norway, a Professorial Research Fellow at the Centre for Applied Philosophy and Public Ethics at Charles Sturt University, Australia, and Professor of Political Philosophy at the University of Central Lancashire's Centre for Professional Ethics, England. Pogge is also a member of the Norwegian Academy of Science and Letters.

== Early career ==
Pogge received his PhD from Harvard University in 1983. His dissertation, titled Kant, Rawls, and Global Justice, was supervised by John Rawls.

== Major works ==
Pogge has published widely on Immanuel Kant, and in moral and political philosophy, including various books and articles on Rawls, global justice, and the duties of the global rich in relation to the global poor.

=== Realizing Rawls (1989) ===
In Realizing Rawls, Pogge defends, criticizes and extends John Rawls's A Theory of Justice (1971). Pogge insists that Rawls has been importantly misunderstood by his most influential critics, including the libertarian Robert Nozick and the communitarian Michael Sandel. According to Pogge, Rawls' reluctance to disagree sharply with his critics has helped these (mis)understandings to become widespread, and has also induced Rawls in his more recent work to dilute the moral statement of his central Rawlsian ideas: first, that moral deliberation must begin from reflection upon the justice of our basic social institutions; and second, that the justice of an institutional scheme is to be assessed by how well its least advantaged participants fare. From these starting points, Pogge develops his own specification of Rawls's principles of justice, discussing the relative importance of different fundamental rights and liberties, the ideal constitution of the political process, and the just organization of educational, health-care, and economic institutions. In the last part of the book, Pogge argues for extending the Rawlsian criterion of justice to the international arena, and identifies those features of the present global order that this criterion would single out as principal targets for institutional reform.

=== The global resource dividend ===
Pogge published essays in 1994 and 1998 advocating collection and distribution of a global resources dividend as a means of supporting the global poor by levying a "tax" on the use of natural resources. His "brief for a global resources dividend" was published in 2001.

=== World Poverty and Human Rights (2002, 2008) ===
Pogge's World Poverty and Human Rights (2002) includes a number of original and substantial theses, the most notable being that people in wealthy Western liberal democracies (such as Western Europeans) are currently harming the world's poor (like those in sub-Saharan Africa). In particular, without denying that much blame should be directed at domestic kleptocrats, Pogge argues that international institutions facilitate and exacerbate the corruption perpetuated by national institutions. Pogge is especially critical of the “resource” and “borrowing” privileges, which allow illegitimate political leaders to sell natural resources and to borrow money in the name of the country and its people. In Pogge's analysis, these resource and borrowing privileges that international society extends to oppressive rulers of impoverished states play a crucial causal role in perpetuating absolute poverty. What is more, Pogge maintains that these privileges are no accident; they persist because they are in the interest of the wealthy states. The resource privilege helps guarantee a reliable supply of raw materials for the goods enjoyed by the members of wealthy states, and the borrowing privilege allows the financial institutions of wealthy states to issue lucrative loans. It may seem that such loans are good for developing states too, but Pogge argues that, in practice, they typically work quite to the contrary:

"Local elites can afford to be oppressive and corrupt, because, with foreign loans and military aid, they can stay in power even without popular support. And they are often so oppressive and corrupt, because it is, in light of the prevailing extreme international inequalities, far more lucrative for them to cater to the interests of foreign governments and firms than to those of their impoverished compatriots."

=== The Health Impact Fund: Making New Medicines Accessible for All (2008) ===
In this book, Thomas Pogge and Aidan Hollis argue in favour of establishing the Health Impact Fund (HIF). The HIF is a new proposal for stimulating research and development of life-saving pharmaceuticals that make substantial reductions in the global burden of disease.

The HIF will provide pharmaceutical companies with a new choice. Pharmaceutical companies can sell a new medicine in the usual manner at patent-protected high prices, or they can choose to register their new medicine with the HIF and sell it globally at the cost of production. If they choose to register their medicine with the HIF, the pharmaceutical company will receive additional payments from the fund that are proportionate to health improvements that are brought about by the registered medicines. The more effective the medicine is in improving global health, the bigger the payout. Because malaria kills millions, the firm that finds and develops a cure can expect a significant return.

== Projects and initiatives ==
=== Giving What We Can ===
Pogge deeply influenced Toby Ord in founding Giving What We Can, an effective altruism organization whose members pledge to give at least 10% of their income to effective charities. The aim of the organization is to encourage people to commit to long-term donations to those charities that provide the most cost-effective good.

In addition, he became a member of the organization at its beginnings in 2009.

=== Incentives for Global Health (IGH) ===
IGH is a non-profit organization dedicated to developing market-based, systemic solutions to health challenges faced by the world's poor. Its flagship proposal is the Health Impact Fund.

=== Academics Stand Against Poverty (ASAP) ===
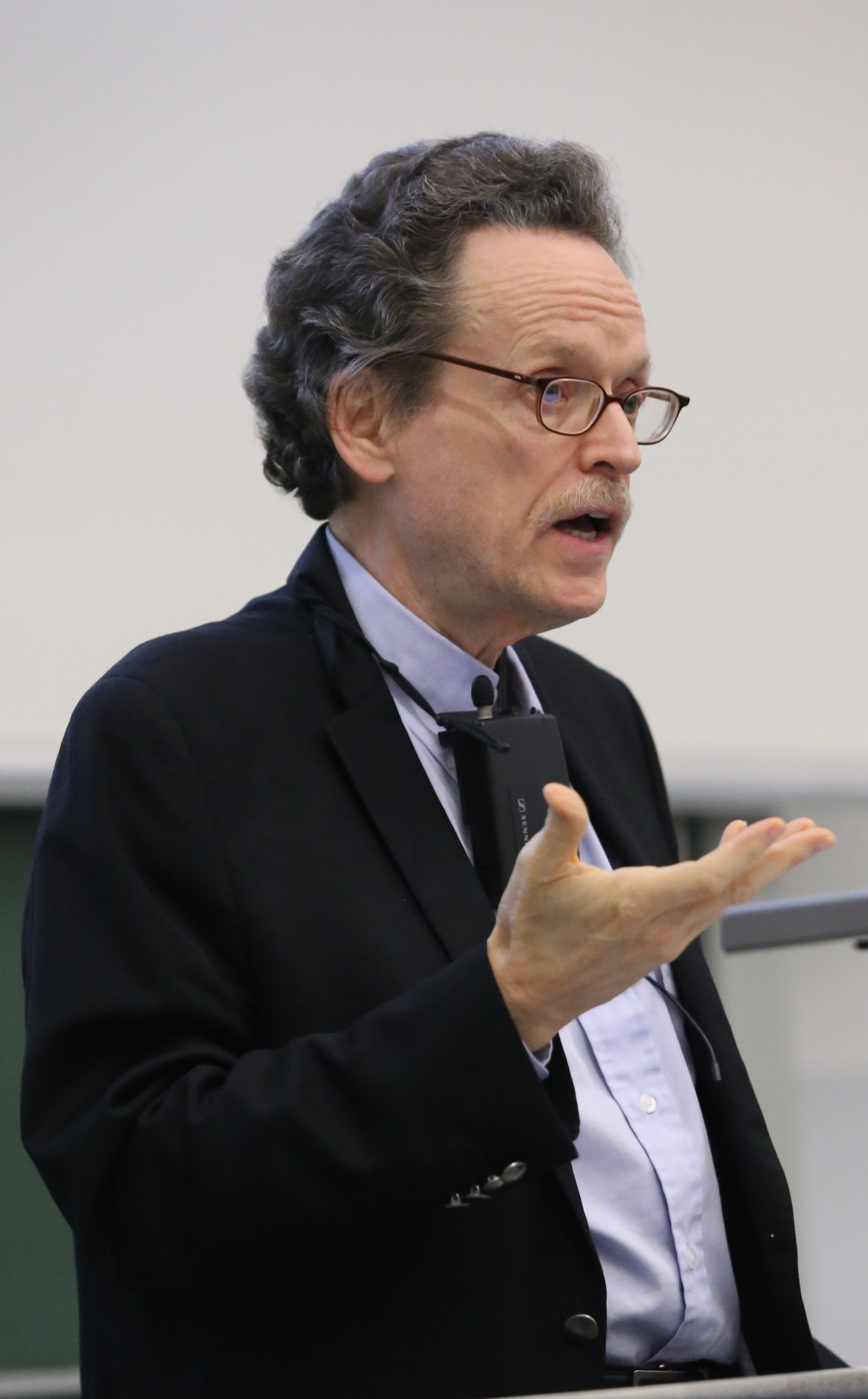
Thomas Pogge speaking in Munich about Academics Stand Against Poverty (2014)

Academics Stand Against Poverty is an organization established to help academics have a greater impact on world poverty. “The group lies between academia and activism. Like the latter, it aims primarily at persuading and motivating people to change their behavior. Like the former, it does so by moral and political argument, using the distinctive skills of academics.”

This project is still in its beginning stages. It has three central aims:

1. To disseminate accessible versions of arguments for taking action against world poverty to the public;
2. To disseminate responses to standard objections to such arguments to the public;
3. To distribute discussion of what individuals and states in developing countries should do in response to world poverty to the public.

=== Poverty and gender equality measurement ===
Various indices - the United Nations Development Programme's Human and Gender‐Related Development Indices, and the World Bank’s Poverty Index - are used to track poverty, development, and gender equity at the population level. Pogge argues that these prominent indices are deeply flawed and therefore distort our moral judgments and misguide resource allocations by governments, international agencies, and non-governmental organizations.

“This project will work toward new indices ‘of poverty and of gender equity’ applicable both at the national and supranational levels, and to smaller groups affected by specific policies and programs. Both indices will draw on a holistic measure of individual (dis)advantage that reflects all relevant aspects of a person's situation.”

Pogge has pursued similar themes in Politics as Usual: What Lies Behind the Pro-Poor Rhetoric (2010).

=== Illicit financial flows ===
This project focuses on the illicit financial flows out of developing countries, the lack of transparency in the global financial system, and the impact these conditions have on human rights. The driving idea behind this project is that “‘human rights and international financial integrity are intimately linked’” and that poverty increases when money flows out of nations illicitly instead of being invested in the basic needs of people in their countries.”

=== Forced Labor and Human Trafficking ===
The Forced Labor and Human Trafficking project aims "to bring public, official, and mainstream media attention to the global crisis of human trafficking and labor abuse towards children and adults". The non-profit organization Art Works Projects is a contributor to this project.

== Sexual harassment allegations ==
As a professor at Columbia University in the mid-1990s, Pogge had been disciplined by the school following allegations of sexual harassment. He was later hired by Yale University. In 2010, Pogge was accused in a high-profile sexual harassment case of by a recent Yale graduate, Fernanda Lopez Aguilar. Aguilar was represented by sexual harassment and discrimination lawyer Ann Olivarius. The university cleared Pogge of misconduct. Afterwards, 169 philosophy professors from several countries, including many in Pogge's own academic department at Yale, signed an open letter condemning his behavior and asking the U.S. Department of Education's Office for Civil Rights to investigate Yale's response. Some of the professors who signed the letter pledged to skip conferences in which Pogge is involved and to remove his work from their curricula. Pogge wrote a detailed defense. In 2019, the Yale Daily News reported a graduate student stating that Pogge continuing to teach undergraduates was a “source of difficulty” and that his presence was cause of "persistent unrest among the graduate students".

== Bibliography ==
- Thomas Pogge, Politics as Usual: What Lies Behind the Pro-Poor Rhetoric (Cambridge: Polity Press 2010)
- Thomas Pogge, The Health Impact Fund: Making New Medicines Accessible for All, authored with Aidan Hollis (Incentives for Global Health, 2008)
- Thomas Pogge, World Poverty and Human Rights: Cosmopolitan Responsibilities and Reforms, 2nd ed. (Cambridge: Polity Press 2008)
- Thomas Pogge, Realizing Rawls (Ithaca: Cornell University Press 1989)
- Ed. Thomas Pogge, Freedom from Poverty as a Human Right (Who owes what to the very poor?) (Oxford: Oxford University Press 2007)

== See also ==
- Global Resources Dividend
