= Social forum =

Open meeting place for civil society organizations

A social forum is an open meeting place for civil society organizations and individuals opposed to neoliberalism, economic globalization, and what its participants regard as the domination of the world by capital and imperialism. The first social forum was the World Social Forum (WSF) held in January 2001 in Porto Alegre, Brazil. It was designed as a counter forum to the World Economic Forum (WEF) held in Davos, Switzerland at the same time. While the WSF regards the WEF as a meeting of the political and economic elite of the world, the WSF gathers social forces and aims to promotes democratization and social justice.

After the first WSF, the social forum idea was replicated across the world in various transnational, national, and local social forums. Most, though not all, social forums adhere to the WSF Charter of Principles, drawn up by the International Council of the WSF. The diversity of participants in the social forums has reflected the diversity of the Global Justice Movement (or Anti-Globalization Movement).

== Transnational social forums ==
After the first gathering of the World Social Forum, many continental social forums formed under the WSF umbrella. The African Social Forum first met in Bamako, Mali, in January 2002. The Americas Social Forum first met in Quito, Ecuador, in 2004. The Asian Pacific Social Forum first met online in 2022.

- African Social Forum
- Americas Social Forum
- Asian Pacific Social Forum
- European Social Forum (ESF)
- Intercontinental Youth Forum
- Mediterranean Social Forum
- Pan-amazon Social Forum
- Southern Africa Social Forum
- World Social Forum

== National social forums ==
- Austrian Social Forum
- Belgian Social Forum
- Belarusian Social Forum
- Danish Social Forum
- Finnish Social Forum
- German Social Forum
- Greek Social Forum
- Hungarian Social Forum
- Norwegian Social Forum
- Romanian Social Forum
- Swiss Social Forum
- Thai Social Forum
- Turkish Social Forum
- United States Social Forum

== Local and regional social forums ==
=== Germany ===
- Berlin Social Forum
- Bremen Social Forum
- Bochum Social Forum
- Erlangen Social Forum
- Freiburg Social Forum
- Heidelberg Social Forum
- Leipzig Social Forum
- Pforzheim Social Forum
- Reutlingen Social Forum
- Saar Social Forum
- Tübingen Social Forum

=== Great Britain ===
- Cardiff Social Forum
- Liverpool Social Forum
- London Social Forum
- Manchester Social Forum
- Sheffield Social Forum

=== India ===
Social forums in India include:

- India Institute for Critical Action: Centre in Movement

=== Italy ===
Social forums in Italy include:

- Genoa Social Forum

=== Sweden ===
Social forums in Sweden include:

- Gothenburg Social Forum
- Gävle Social Forum
- Skåne Social Forum
- Stockholm Social Forum
- Umeå Social Forum
- Uppsala Social Forum

=== United States ===
- Boston Social Forum
- Southeast Social Forum
- Local to Global Justice Teach-in

== Thematic social forums ==
- Social Forum of Architecture

== See also ==
- World Social Forum
- Social Forums
