= United States Social Forum =

The United States Social Forum is an ongoing series of gatherings of social justice activists in the United States which grew out of the World Social Forum process, bringing together activists, organizers, people of color, working people, poor people, and indigenous people from across the United States. Its purpose is to build unity around common goals of social justice, build ties between organizations at the event, and help build a broader social justice movement. Planning for the first event was spearheaded by the organization Project South: Institute for the Elimination of Poverty and Genocide, and involved dozens of other organizations around the United States. The Forum defines itself as "a movement-building process. It is not a conference but it is a space to come up with the peoples’ solutions to the economic and ecological crisis. The USSF is the next most important step in our struggle to build a powerful multi-racial, multi-sectoral, inter-generational, diverse, inclusive, internationalist movement that transforms this country and changes history."

== National Planning Committee ==
After the 2005 World Social Forum in Porto Alegre, the US Social Forum National Planning Committee was created by the WSF's International Council designating the alliance "Grassroots Global Justice" as the core group. It includes over 45 groups who oversee the US Social Forum's fiscal and political responsibilities.

The committee includes a number of big labor rights and social justice organizations, such as the AFL-CIO, Amnesty International USA, AFSCME, Center for Third World Organizing, Indigenous Environmental Network, Jubilee USA, Sociologists Without Borders.

== Activities ==
- Self-organized workshops
- People's Movement Assemblies
- Plenaries
- Work projects and brigades
- Detroit Expanded (DEX)
- USSF village and canopies
- Arts & culture - performances, exhibitions, film festival
- Children's social forum & youth camp
- International participation
- Direct action
- Open Spaces
- Tours
- Grassroots fundraising

== 2007 Forum ==
The first Forum was in Atlanta, Georgia, USA from June 27 – July 1, 2007. Planning began in 2005. In June 2006, the Southeast Social Forum was in Durham, North Carolina; one of its priorities was to plan for and build momentum for the US Social Forum.

On June 27, the opening march began at the Georgia State Capitol and ended at the Atlanta Civic Center. Organizers hoped for at least 10,000 people; about 15,000 attended.

The Forum's goal was to help build a movement that would end harmful US practices against all people by helping coordinate local activists into a nationwide movement. This took shape as the National Domestic Workers Alliance, a group working for a Domestic Worker's Bill of Rights in various states.

Activist librarians from the Progressive Librarians Guild and Radical Reference collected materials that were sent to the Labadie Collection at the University of Michigan.

== 2010 Forum ==
The 2010 Forum was in Detroit, Michigan from June 22–26, in the Northwest Goldberg area. More than 20,000 attended. Detroit was chosen partly because of its activism in community building resulting from a lack of support from the U.S. federal government. Organizers hoped that half of the 15,000 participants they expected would be from the Midwest.

Organizers planned on supporting and beautifying the neighborhood. Thousands of bicycles used during the forum were donated to the residents afterward. Some attendees bought vacant homes that were donated to a local organization after the Forum. The Detroit Liberation Library was created from hundreds of books collected from USSF participants from around the US that were later offered throughout the city.

The Forum's supporters were encouraged to create People's Movement Assemblies in their own communities.

Activists participated in more than 1,000 self-organized workshops. One of the most popular events was a conversation between Grace Lee Boggs and Immanuel Wallerstein. Thousands of Forum participants marched to occupy Chase Bank Detroit headquarters, resulting in a national Chase Bank official speaking with church leaders in Detroit about foreclosures.

Progressive religious groups played a larger role in the 2010 Forum than at the 2007 event.

=== People's Movement Assemblies ===
People's Movement Assemblies (PMA's) are informally organized groups of activists to create and coordinate solutions to various social problems. At the 2010 US Social Forum, over 200 organizations participated in 52 PMA's of four people each. 45 resolutions for action were confirmed, adding to another 24 created before the Forum. They included an endorsement of Boycott, Divestment and Sanctions against Israel in support of the Palestinian struggle.

== Sources ==
"PLG – ¡Presenté! Report from the United States Social Forum." Progressive Librarian 30. Winter 2007/2008, pp. 79–102.

== See also ==
- World Social Forum
- European Social Forum
- Southern Africa Social Forum
- Boston Social Forum
- Southeast Social Forum
- World Economic Forum
