= American Left =

Left-wing politics in the United States

The American Left refers to the groups or ideas on the left of the political spectrum in the United States—predominantly the broader democratic socialist and social democratic currents as well as communist, left-liberal, and various socialist ideological sects. It is occasionally used as a shorthand for the Democratic Party and groups aligned with the Democratic Party. At other times, it refers to groups that seek or have sought egalitarian changes in the economic, political, and cultural institutions of the United States. Various left subgroups with a national scope are active. Liberals and progressives believe that equality can be accommodated into existing capitalist structures, but they differ in their criticism of capitalism and on the extent of reform and the welfare state. Anarchists, communists, and socialists with international imperatives are also present within this macro-movement. Many communes and egalitarian communities have existed in the United States as a sub-category of the broader intentional community movement, some of which were based on utopian socialist ideals. The left has been involved in both the Democratic and Republican parties at different times, having originated in the Democratic-Republican Party as opposed to the Federalist Party.

== Background ==
Although left-wing politics came to the United States in the 19th century, there are currently no major left-wing political parties in the country. Despite existing left-wing factions within the center-left Democratic Party, as well as minor third parties such as the Green Party, Communist Party USA, Party for Socialism and Liberation, Revolutionary Communists of America, Workers World Party, Socialist Party, and American Solidarity Party (a Christian-democratic party leaning left on economics), there have been few representatives of left-leaning third parties in Congress. Academic scholars have long studied the reasons why no viable socialist parties have emerged in the United States. Some writers ascribe this to the failures of socialist organization and leadership, some to the incompatibility of socialism with American values, and others to the limitations imposed by the United States Constitution. Vladimir Lenin and Leon Trotsky were particularly concerned with the lack of a viable American Left because it challenged orthodox Marxist beliefs that advanced industrial countries, like the United States, would provide a model for the future of less developed nations. While branches of the Working Men's Party were founded in the 1820s and 1830s in the United States, they advocated land reform, universal education and improved working conditions in the form of labor rights, not collective ownership, disappearing after their goals were taken up by Jacksonian democracy. Samuel Gompers, the leader of the American Federation of Labor, opposed communism in favor of Georgism and thought that American workers must rely on themselves because any rights provided by the government could be revoked.

Economic unrest in the 1890s was represented by populism and the People's Party. Although using anti-capitalist rhetoric, it represented the views of small farmers who wanted to protect their own private property, not a call for communism, collectivism, or socialism. Progressives in the early 20th century criticized the way capitalism had developed but were essentially middle class and reformist; however, both populism and progressivism steered some to left-wing politics; many popular writers of the progressive period were left-wing. Even the New Left relied on radical democratic traditions rather than left-wing ideology. Friedrich Engels thought that the lack of a feudal past was the reason for the American working class holding middle-class values. Writing at a time when American industry was developing quickly towards the mass-production system known as Fordism, Max Weber and Antonio Gramsci saw individualism and laissez-faire liberalism as core shared American beliefs. According to the historian David De Leon, American radicalism was rooted in libertarianism and syndicalism rather than communism, Fabianism and social democracy, being opposed to centralized power and collectivism. The character of the American political system is hostile toward third parties and has also been presented as a reason for the absence of a strong socialist party in the United States. Political repression has also contributed to the weakness of the left in the United States. Many cities had Red Squads to monitor and disrupt leftist groups in response to labor unrest such as the Haymarket Riot. The legacy of slavery and racial discrimination created deep divisions within the working class, producing a racially stratified, two-tiered labor force. These divisions fostered divergent political priorities and undermined class solidarity, making it more difficult for left-wing movements to build broad-based coalitions.

During World War II, the Smith Act made membership in revolutionary groups illegal. After the war, Senator Joseph McCarthy used the Smith Act to launch a crusade (McCarthyism) to purge alleged communists from government and the media. In the 1960s, the FBI's COINTELPRO program monitored, infiltrated, disrupted and discredited radical groups in the United States. In 2008, Maryland police were revealed to have added the names and personal information of anti-war protesters and death penalty opponents to a database which was intended to be used for tracking terrorists. Terry Turchie, a former deputy assistant director of the FBI Counterterrorism Division, admitted that "one of the missions of the FBI in its counterintelligence efforts was to try to keep these people (progressives and self-described socialists) out of office."

== History ==
=== Origins and developments (17th century–20th century) ===
Many indigenous tribes in North America practiced what Marxists would later call primitive communism, meaning they practiced economic cooperation among the members of their tribes.

The first European socialists to arrive in North America were a Christian sect known as Labadists, who founded the commune of Bohemia Manor in 1683, about 60 miles (97 km) west of Philadelphia, Pennsylvania. Their communal way of life was based on the communal practices of the apostles and early Christians.

The first secular American socialists were German Marxist immigrants who arrived following the Revolutions of 1848, also known as Forty-Eighters. Joseph Weydemeyer, a German colleague of Karl Marx who sought refuge in New York in 1851 following the 1848 revolutions, established the first Marxist journal in the U.S., called Die Revolution, but it folded after two issues. In 1852, he established the Proletarierbund, which would become the American Workers' League, the first Marxist organization in the U.S., but it too was short-lived, having failed to attract a native English-speaking membership.

In 1866, William H. Sylvis formed the National Labor Union (NLU). Frederich Albert Sorge, a German who had found refuge in New York following the 1848 revolutions, took Local No. 5 of the NLU into the First International as Section One in the U.S. By 1872, there were 22 sections, which were able to hold a convention in New York. The General Council of the International moved to New York with Sorge as General Secretary, but following internal conflict, it dissolved in 1876.

A larger wave of German immigrants followed in the 1870s and 1880s, which included social democratic followers of Ferdinand Lassalle. Lassalle believed that state aid through political action was the road to revolution and was opposed to trade unionism, which he saw as futile, believing that according to the iron law of wages, employers would only pay subsistence wages. The Lassalleans formed the Social Democratic Party of North America in 1874 and both Marxists and Lassalleans formed the Workingmen's Party of the United States in 1876. When the Lassalleans gained control in 1877, they changed the name to the Socialist Labor Party of North America (SLP). However, many socialists abandoned political action altogether and moved to trade unionism. Two former socialists, Adolph Strasser and Samuel Gompers, formed the American Federation of Labor (AFL) in 1886.

Anarchists split from the Socialist Labor Party to form the Revolutionary Socialist Party in 1881. By 1885, they had 7,000 members, double the membership of the SLP. They were inspired by the International Anarchist Congress of 1881 in London. There were two federations in the United States that pledged adherence to the International. A convention of immigrant anarchists in Chicago formed the International Working People's Association (Black International), while a group of native-born Americans in San Francisco formed the International Workingmen's Association (Red International). Following a violent demonstration at Haymarket in Chicago in 1886, public opinion turned against anarchism. While very little violence could be attributed to anarchists, the attempted murder of a financier by an anarchist in 1892 and the 1901 assassination of the American president, William McKinley, by a professed anarchist led to the ending of political asylum for anarchists in 1903. In 1919, following the Palmer Raids, anarchists were imprisoned and many, including Emma Goldman and Alexander Berkman, were deported. Yet anarchism again reached great public notice with the trial of the anarchists Sacco and Vanzetti, who would be executed in 1927.

Daniel De Leon, who became leader of the SLP in 1890, took it in a Marxist direction. Eugene V. Debs, who had been an organizer for the American Railway Union, formed the rival Social Democratic Party of America in 1898. Members of the SLP, led by Morris Hillquit and opposed to the De Leon's domineering personal rule and his anti-AFL trade union policy joined with the Social Democrats to form the Socialist Party of America (SPA). In 1905, a convention of socialists, anarchists and trade unionists disenchanted with the bureaucracy and craft unionism of the AFL, founded the rival Industrial Workers of the World (IWW), led by such figures as William D. "Big Bill" Haywood, Helen Keller, De Leon and Debs.

The organizers of the IWW disagreed on whether electoral politics could be employed to liberate the working class. Debs left the IWW in 1906, and De Leon was expelled in 1908, forming a rival "Chicago IWW" that was closely linked to the SLP. The (Minneapolis) IWW's ideology evolved into anarcho-syndicalism, or "revolutionary industrial unionism", and avoided electoral political activity altogether. It was successful in organizing unskilled migratory workers in the lumber, agriculture, and construction trades in the Western states and immigrant textile workers in the Eastern states and occasionally accepted violence as part of industrial action.

The SPA was divided between reformers who believed that socialism could be achieved through gradual reform of capitalism and revolutionaries who thought that socialism could only develop after capitalism was overthrown, but the party steered a center path between the two. The SPA achieved the peak of its success by 1912 when its presidential candidate received 5.9% of the popular vote. The first Socialist congressman, Victor L. Berger, had been elected in 1910. By the beginning of 1912, there were 1,039 Socialist officeholders, including 56 mayors, 305 aldermen and councilmen, 22 police officials, and some state legislators. Milwaukee, Berkeley, Butte, Schenectady, and Flint were run by Socialists. A Socialist challenger to Gompers took one-third of the vote in a challenge for leadership of the AFL. The SPA had five English and eight foreign-language daily newspapers, 262 English and 36 foreign-language weeklies, and 10 English and two foreign-language monthlies.

American entry into the First World War in 1917 led to a patriotic hysteria aimed against Germans, immigrants, African Americans, class-conscious workers, and Socialists, and the ensuing Espionage Act and Sedition Act were used against them. The government harassed Socialist newspapers, the post office denied the SP use of the mails, and anti-war militants were arrested. Soon Debs and more than sixty IWW leaders were charged under the acts.

=== Communist–Socialist split, the New Deal and Red Scare (1910s–1940s) ===
In 1919, John Reed, Benjamin Gitlow and other Socialists formed the Communist Labor Party of America, while Socialist foreign sections led by C. E. Ruthenberg formed the Communist Party. These two groups would be combined as the Communist Party USA (CPUSA). The Communists organized the Trade Union Unity League to compete with the AFL and claimed to represent 50,000 workers.

In 1928, following divisions inside the Soviet Union, Jay Lovestone, who had replaced Ruthenberg as general secretary of the CPUSA following his death, joined with William Z. Foster to expel Foster's former allies, James P. Cannon and Max Shachtman, who were followers of Leon Trotsky. Following another Soviet factional dispute, Lovestone and Gitlow were expelled, and Earl Browder became party leader.

Cannon, Shachtman, and Martin Abern then set up the Trotskyist Communist League of America, and recruited members from the CPUSA. The League then merged with A. J. Muste's American Workers Party in 1934, forming the Workers Party. New members included James Burnham and Sidney Hook.

By the 1930s the Socialist Party was deeply divided between an Old Guard, led by Hillquit, and younger Militants, who were more sympathetic to the Soviet Union, led by Norman Thomas. The Old Guard left the party to form the Social Democratic Federation. Following talks between the Workers Party and the Socialists, members of the Workers Party joined the Socialists in 1936. Once inside they operated as a separate faction. The Trotskyists were expelled from the Socialist Party the following year and set up the Socialist Workers Party (SWP) and the youth wing of the Socialists, the Young People's Socialist League (YPSL) joined them. Shachtman and others were expelled from the SWP in 1940 over their position on the Soviet Union and set up the Workers Party. Within months many members of the new party, including Burnham, had left. The Workers Party was renamed the Independent Socialist League (ISL) in 1949 and ceased being a political party.

Some members of the Socialist Party's Old Guard formed the American Labor Party (ALP) in New York State, with support from the Congress of Industrial Organizations (CIO). The right wing of this party broke away in 1944 to form the Liberal Party of New York. In the 1936, 1940 and 1944 elections the ALP received 274,000, 417,000, and 496,000 votes in New York State, while the Liberals received 329,000 votes in 1944.

=== Civil rights, War on Poverty and the New Left (1950s–1960s) ===
In 1958, the Socialist Party welcomed former members of the Independent Socialist League, which, before its 1956 dissolution, had been led by Max Shachtman. Shachtman had developed a neo-Marxist critique of Soviet communism as "bureaucratic collectivism", a new form of class society that was more oppressive than any form of capitalism. Shachtman's theory was similar to that of many dissidents and refugees from Communism, such as the theory of the "new class" proposed by Yugoslavian dissident Milovan Djilas. Shachtman's ISL had attracted youth like Irving Howe, Michael Harrington, Tom Kahn, and Rachelle Horowitz. The YPSL was dissolved, but the party formed a new youth group under the same name.

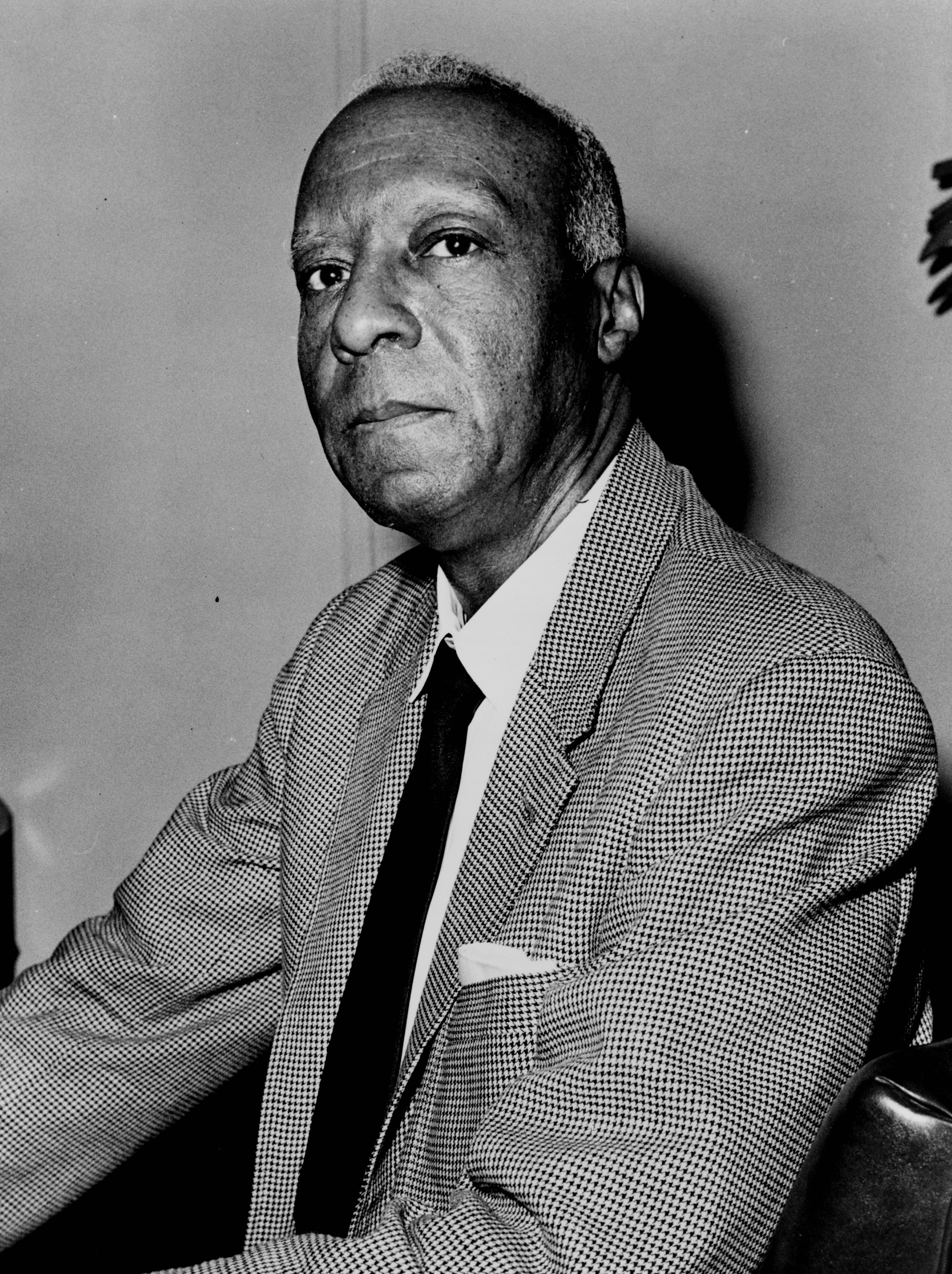
Socialist A. Philip Randolph, who led the March on Washington for Jobs and Freedom at which Martin Luther King Jr. delivered his speech "I Have a Dream"

Kahn and Horowitz, along with Norman Hill, helped Bayard Rustin with the civil rights movement. Rustin had helped to spread pacificism and nonviolence to leaders of the civil rights movement, like Martin Luther King Jr. Rustin's circle and A. Philip Randolph organized the 1963 March on Washington, where Martin Luther King delivered his I Have a Dream speech.

Michael Harrington soon became the most visible socialist in the United States when his The Other America became a best seller, following a long and laudatory New Yorker review by Dwight Macdonald. Harrington and other socialists were called to Washington, D.C., to assist the Kennedy Administration and then the Johnson Administration's War on Poverty and Great Society.

Shachtman, Harrington, Kahn, and Rustin advocated for a political strategy called "realignment" that prioritized strengthening labor unions and other progressive organizations that were already active in the Democratic Party. Contributing to the day-to-day struggles of the civil rights movement and labor unions had gained socialists credibility and influence, and had helped to push politicians in the Democratic Party towards "social-liberal" or social-democratic positions, at least on civil rights and the War on Poverty.

Harrington, Kahn, and Horowitz were officers and staff-persons of the League for Industrial Democracy (LID), which helped to start the New Left Students for a Democratic Society (SDS). The three LID officers clashed with the less experienced activists of SDS, like Tom Hayden, when the latter's Port Huron Statement criticized socialist and liberal opposition to communism and criticized the labor movement while promoting students as agents of social change. LID and SDS split in 1965, when SDS voted to remove from its constitution the "exclusion clause" that prohibited membership by communists: The SDS exclusion clause had barred "advocates of or apologists for" "totalitarianism". The clause's removal effectively invited "disciplined cadre" to attempt to "take over or paralyze" SDS, as had occurred to mass organizations in the thirties. Afterwards, Marxism–Leninism, particularly the Progressive Labor Party, helped to write "the death sentence" for SDS, which nonetheless had over 100 thousand members at its peak.

=== SDUSA–SPUSA split, foundation of DSOC–DSA and anti-WTO protests (1970s–1990s) ===
In 1972, the Socialist Party voted to rename itself as Social Democrats, USA (SDUSA) by a vote of 73 to 34 at its December Convention; its National Chairmen were Bayard Rustin, a peace and civil-rights leader, and Charles S. Zimmerman, an officer of the International Ladies Garment Workers Union (ILGWU). In 1973, Michael Harrington resigned from SDUSA and founded the Democratic Socialist Organizing Committee (DSOC), which attracted many of his followers from the former Socialist Party. The same year, David McReynolds and others from the pacifist and immediate-withdrawal wing of the former Socialist Party formed the Socialist Party USA.

When the SPA became SDUSA, the majority had 22 of 33 votes on the (January 1973) national committee of SDUSA. Two minority caucuses of SDUSA became associated with two other socialist organizations, each of which was founded later in 1973. Many members of Michael Harrington's ("Coalition") caucus, with 8 of 33 seats on the 1973 SDUSA national committee, joined Harrington's DSOC. Many members of the Debs caucus, with 2 of 33 seats on SDUSA's 1973 national committee, joined the Socialist Party of the United States (SPUSA).

From 1979 to 1989, SDUSA members like Tom Kahn organized the AFL-CIO's fundraising of $300,000, which bought printing presses and other supplies requested by Solidarnosc (Solidarity), the independent labor-union of Poland. SDUSA members helped form a bipartisan coalition (of the Democratic and Republican parties) to support the founding of the National Endowment for Democracy (NED), whose first President was Carl Gershman. The NED publicly allocated $4 million of public aid to Solidarity through 1989.

The Democratic Socialists of America was founded in 1982 with the goal of running candidates in Democratic primaries and winning.

In the 1990s, anarchists attempted to organize across North America around Love and Rage, which drew several hundred activists. By 1997 anarchist organizations began to proliferate. One successful anarchist movement was Food Not Bombs, that distributed free vegetarian meals. Anarchists received significant media coverage for their disruption of the 1999 World Trade Organization conference, called the Battle in Seattle, where the Direct Action Network was organized. Most organizations were short-lived and anarchism went into decline following a reaction by the authorities that was increased after the September 11 attacks in 2001.

=== Occupy, Bernie Sanders campaigns and DSA electoral victories (2000s–present) ===
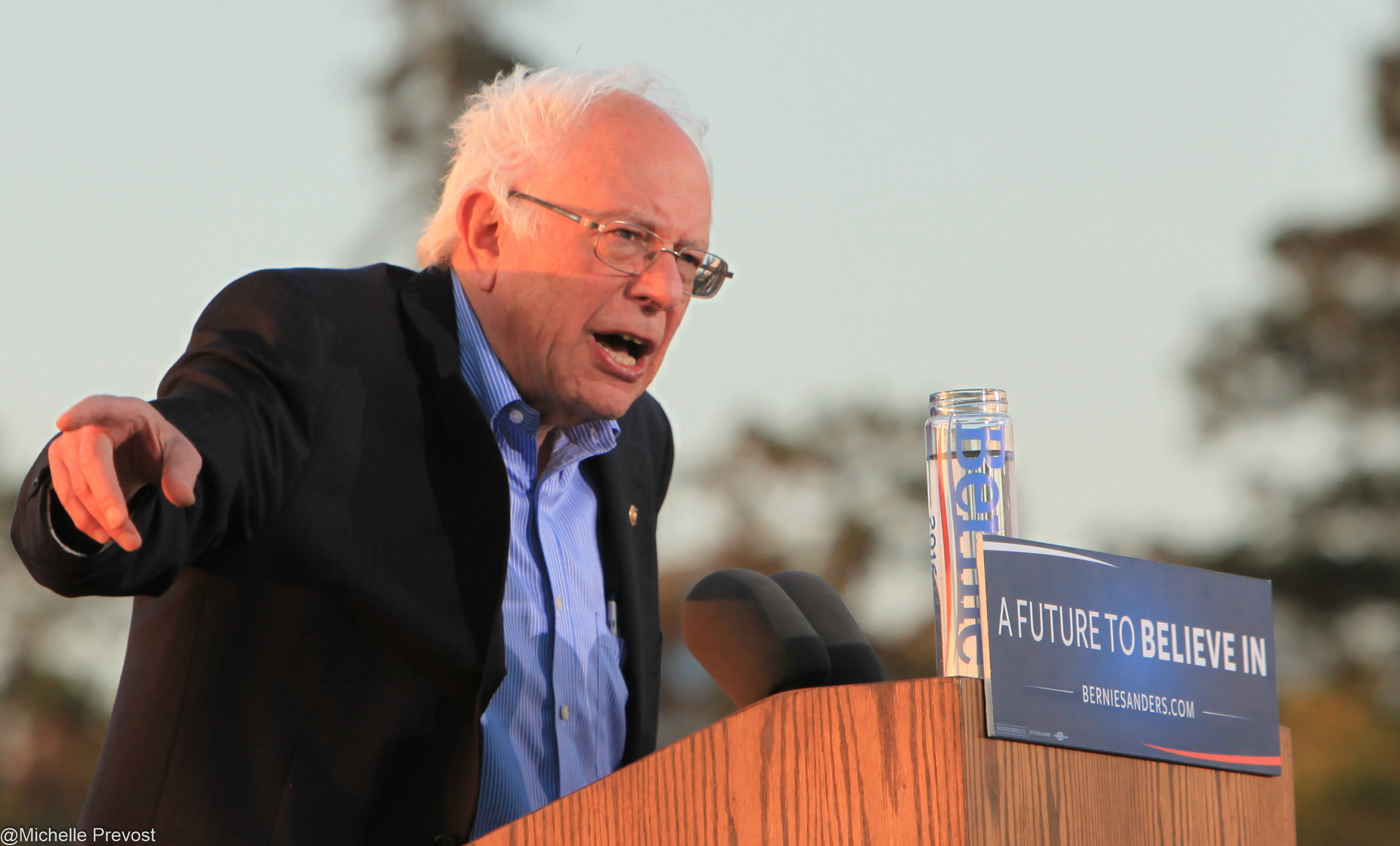
Bernie Sanders is considered one of the most influential political figures of the contemporary American left.

In the 2000 presidential election, Ralph Nader and Winona LaDuke received 2,882,000 votes or 2.74% of the popular vote on the Green Party ticket.

Filmmaker Michael Moore directed a series of popular movies examining the United States and its government policy from a left-wing perspective, including Bowling for Columbine, Sicko, Capitalism: A Love Story and Fahrenheit 9/11, which was the top grossing documentary film of all time.

According to The New Republic, Barack Obama's victory in the 2008 United States presidential election "would thrill and then embitter a generation of leftists" with "Millennials curious about socialism [being] drawn to" Obama, "especially as he successfully repelled the avatar of the Democratic establishment, Hillary Clinton. In office, however, Obama veered to the economic center, tapping Rahm Emanuel as his chief of staff and allowing fiscal moderates like Timothy Geithner and Larry Summers to steer the recovery from the economic crash."

In 2011, Occupy Wall Street protests demanding accountability for the 2008 financial crisis and against inequality started in Manhattan, New York City, and soon spread to other cities around the country, becoming known more broadly as the Occupy movement.

Kshama Sawant was elected to the Seattle City Council as an openly socialist candidate in 2013. She was re-elected in 2015.

Bernie Sanders, a self-described democratic socialist who runs as an independent, won his first election as mayor of Burlington, Vermont, in 1981 and was re-elected for three additional terms. He then represented Vermont in the U.S. House of Representatives from 1991 until 2007, and was subsequently elected U.S. Senator for Vermont in 2007, a position which he still holds. Although he did not win the 2016 Democratic Party presidential nomination, Sanders won the fifth highest number of primary votes of any candidate in a nomination race, Democratic or Republican, and had caused an upset in Michigan and many other states.

Democratic Socialists of America member Alexandria Ocasio-Cortez defeated ten-term incumbent Joe Crowley in the NY-14 U.S. House primary and went on to win her general election. She is the youngest woman ever elected to Congress and ran on a progressive platform. The DSA has seen a huge resurgence in growth with Bernie Sanders' 2016 presidential campaign and continues to grow despite having had a membership of around 5,000 members only a decade ago. Unlike other parts of the modern left like the Socialist Equality Party, the DSA is not a political party and its affiliated candidates usually run on a Democratic or independent ticket. DSA member Zohran Mamdani was elected Mayor of New York City on November 4, 2025.

== Political currents ==
=== Democratic socialism, social democracy, and resurgence of progressivism ===
Use of the socialist label became more prominent after Socialist Party of America was founded in 1901. Eugene Debs ran as the party's presidential candidate five times and received 6% of the popular vote in 1912. The party suffered political repression during World War I due to its pacifist stance and broke into factions over whether or not to support the Bolshevik Revolution in Russia and whether or not to join the Comintern. The Socialist Party was re-formed in the mid-1920s but stopped running candidates after 1956, having been undercut by Franklin D. Roosevelt's New Deal and the resulting leftward movement of the Democratic Party to its right, and by the Communist Party on its left. In the early 1970s, the party split into tiny factions.

After 1960 the Socialist Party also functioned "as an educational organization". Members of the Debs–Thomas Socialist Party helped to develop leaders of social-movement organizations, including the civil-rights movement and the New Left. Similarly, contemporary social-democratic and democratic-socialist organizations are known because of their members' activities in other organizations.

When used in a broader sense, the American left can also refer to progressivism as the movement is largely sympathetic to social democratic principles, despite there existing differences in approach between progressive factions such as more capitalist-leaning American social liberals and social democrats versus some anti-capitalist democratic socialists. Following a slow in usage after the Progressive Era and post-F.D.R., progressivism had a rebirth in the 21st century with the election of President Barack Obama, and the election of politicians to Obama's left including Alexandria Ocasio-Cortez, Bernie Sanders, and Elizabeth Warren. The label has been more broadly embraced by Democratic Party elected officials since the 2016 United States presidential election, since Democratic nominee Hillary Clinton referred to herself as a "progressive who likes to get things done" during a CNN primary debate with Sanders, who also brandished the progressive label and indicated some degree of value consensus despite differing policies. The Democratic Party has adopted an increasingly progressive stance with the presidency Joe Biden and his progressive economic agenda. Biden's presidency has been considered to be ushering-in more principles of social democracy into American government.

==== Democratic Socialists of America ====
Michael Harrington resigned from Social Democrats, USA early in 1973. He rejected the SDUSA (majority Socialist Party) position on the Vietnam War, which demanded an end to bombings and a negotiated peace settlement. Harrington called rather for an immediate cease fire and immediate withdrawal of U.S. forces from Vietnam. Even before the December 1972 convention, Michael Harrington had resigned as an Honorary Chairperson of the Socialist Party. In the early spring of 1973, he resigned his membership in SDUSA. That same year, Harrington and his supporters formed the Democratic Socialist Organizing Committee (DSOC). At its start, DSOC had 840 members, of which 2 percent served on its national board; approximately 200 had been members of Social Democrats, USA or its predecessors whose membership was then 1,800, according to a 1973 profile of Harrington.

The DSOC became a member of the Socialist International. It supported progressive Democrats including DSOC member Congressman Ron Dellums and worked to help network activists in the Democratic Party and in labor unions.

In 1982, the DSOC established the Democratic Socialists of America (DSA) upon merging with the New American Movement, an organization of democratic socialists mostly from the New Left. Its high-profile members included Congressman Major Owens, Congresswoman Rashida Tlaib, Congresswoman Alexandria Ocasio-Cortez, Congressman Ron Dellums, multiple state legislators (Sara Innamorato, Lee J. Carter, Summer Lee, Julia Salazar), and William Winpisinger, President of the International Association of Machinists. In 2019 at the Democratic Socialists of America convention in Atlanta, Georgia, DSA confirmed its support for Senator Bernie Sanders in the 2020 United States presidential election.

Since the 2016 United States presidential election, the DSA has grown to more than 50,000 members, making it the largest socialist organization in the United States. In 2017, DSA left the Socialist International, citing its support of neoliberal economic policies.

==== Social Democrats, USA ====
The Socialist Party of America changed its name to Social Democrats, USA (SDUSA) in 1972. In electoral politics, SDUSA's National Co-chairman Bayard Rustin stated that its goal was to transform the Democratic Party into a social-democratic party. SDUSA sponsored conferences that featured discussions and debates over proposed resolutions, some of which were adopted as organizational statements. For these conferences, SDUSA invited a range of academic, political, and labor-union leaders. These meetings also functioned as reunions for political activists and intellectuals, some of whom worked together for decades.

Many SDUSA members served as organizational leaders, especially in labor unions. Rustin served as President of the A. Philip Randolph Institute, and was succeeded by Norman Hill. Tom Kahn served as Director of International Affairs for the AFL–CIO. Sandra Feldman served as President of the American Federation of Teachers (AFT). Rachelle Horowitz served as Political Director for the AFT and serves on the board for the National Democratic Institute. Other members of SDUSA specialized in international politics. Penn Kemble served as the acting director of the U.S. Information Agency in the Presidency of Bill Clinton. After having served as the U.S. representative to the U.N.'s Committee on human rights during the first Reagan administration, Carl Gershman has served as the president of the National Endowment for Democracy.

==== Socialist Party USA ====
In the Socialist Party before 1973, members of the Debs Caucus opposed endorsing or otherwise supporting Democratic Party candidates. They began working outside the Socialist Party with antiwar groups such as the Students for a Democratic Society. Some locals voted to disaffiliate with SDUSA and more members resigned; they re-organized as the Socialist Party USA (SPUSA) while continuing to operate the old Debs Caucus paper, the Socialist Tribune, later renamed The Socialist. The SPUSA continues to run local and national candidates, including Dan La Botz's 2010 campaign for US Senate in Ohio that won over 25,000 votes and Pat Noble's successful election onto the Red Bank Regional High School Board of Education in 2012 and subsequent re-election in 2015. The SPUSA has run or endorsed a presidential ticket in every election since its founding, most recently nominating Greens party co-founder and activist Howie Hawkins in the 2020 presidential election.

=== Christian democracy ===
==== American Solidarity Party ====
The American Solidarity Party (ASP) is a Christian-democratic political party that supports social-democratic and fiscally progressive policies in the United States. It favors a social market economy with a distributist flavor, and seeks "widespread economic participation and ownership" through supporting small business, as well as providing a social safety net programs. It also has a minor anti-capitalism faction. The party's name was inspired by Solidarity (Solidarnosc), the independent labor union of Poland.

=== Green politics ===
==== Green Party of the United States ====
The Green Party of the United States is an eco-socialist party whose platform emphasizes environmentalism, non-hierarchical participatory democracy, social justice, respect for diversity, peace, and nonviolence. At their 2016 party convention in Houston, the party changed its platform to support a decentralized form of eco-socialism based on workplace democracy.

In the 2000 presidential election, Ralph Nader and Winona LaDuke received 2,882,955 votes or 2.74% of the popular vote.

In the 2016 election, Green Party presidential candidate Jill Stein and running mate Ajamu Baraka qualified to be on the ballot in 44 states and the District of Columbia, with 3 additional states allowing write-in votes.

The Association of State Green Parties and the Greens/Green Party USA were much smaller green groups focusing on education and local, grassroots organizing.

=== Anarchism ===
Anarchism in the United States first emerged from individualistic, free-thinking, and utopian socialism as typified by the work of thinkers such as Josiah Warren and Henry David Thoreau. This was overshadowed by a mass, cosmopolitan, and working-class movement between the 1880s and 1940s, whose members were mostly recent immigrants, including those of German, Italian, Jewish, Mexican, and Russian descent.

Prominent figures of this period include Albert Parsons and Lucy Parsons, Emma Goldman, Carlo Tresca, and Ricardo Flores Magón. The anarchist movement achieved notoriety due to violent clashes with police, assassinations, and sensational Red Scare propaganda, but most anarchist activity took place in the realm of agitation and labor organizing among largely immigrant workers. Anarchist organizations include:

- Anarchist Black Cross
- Anarchist People of Color
- Black Rose Anarchist Federation/Federación Anarquista Rosa Negra
- First of May Anarchist Alliance
- Food Not Bombs
- Green Mountain Anarchist Collective
- Industrial Workers of the World
- International Working People's Association
- Local to Global Justice
- Revolutionary Socialist League
- Union of Russian Workers
- Workers Solidarity Alliance
- Youth International Party

=== De Leonism ===
De Leonism, occasionally known as Marxism–De Leonism, is a libertarian Marxist ideological variant developed by the American activist Daniel De Leon.

==== Socialist Labor Party ====
Founded in 1876, the Socialist Labor Party (SLP) was a reformist party but adopted the theories of Karl Marx and Daniel De Leon in 1900, leading to the defection of reformers to the new Socialist Party of America (SPA). It contested elections, including every election for President of the United States from 1892 to 1976. Some of its prominent members included Jack London and James Connolly. By 2009 it had lost its premises and ceased publishing its newspaper, The People.

In 1970, a group of dissidents left the SLP to form Socialist Reconstruction. Socialist Reconstruction then expelled some of its dissidents, who formed the Socialist Forum Group.

=== Marxism–Leninism ===
Marxism–Leninism has been advocated and practiced by American communists of many kinds, including members of pro-Soviet, Maoist, and Hoxhaist parties as well as by independent voters.

==== American Communist Party ====
The American Communist Party (ACP) is a Marxist–Leninist political party formed in 2024 when its members split from the Communist Party USA.

ACP has been described as MAGA Communist, as notable ACP founders Jackson Hinkle and Haz Al-Din have promoted it and similar conservative communist labels since 2022. MAGA Communism has been described as anti-feminist, queerphobic, anti-woke, anti-environmentalist, pro–social services, pro–tax cuts, and pro–Donald Trump. ACP leaders argue that MAGA Communism is a tool to shift the American working class away from capitalism and toward communism.

ACP officially adheres to Marxism–Leninism, and also promotes socialist patriotism. The ACP aligns with the Chinese view of the Sino-Soviet split, regards the de-Stalinized Soviet Union as revisionist, supports the Cultural Revolution, celebrates the Chinese economic reforms, and upholds Xi Jinping Thought. ACP and its leaders support China, North Korea, Iran, Nicaragua, Nicolás Maduro's Venezuelan government, and the Russian "Special Military Operation".

==== American Party of Labor ====
The American Party of Labor was founded in 2008 and adheres to Hoxhaism. It has its origins in the activities of the American communist Jack Shulman, former secretary of Communist Party USA leader William Z. Foster, and the British Marxist-Leninist Bill Bland. Members of the American Party of Labor had previously been active in Alliance Marxist-Leninist and International Struggle Marxist-Leninist, two organizations founded by Shulman and Bland. The present-day APL sees itself as upholding and continuing the work of Shulman and Bland. The party has been a full member of the International Conference of Marxist–Leninist Parties and Organizations (Unity & Struggle) since 2024 and maintains friendly relations with a number of foreign communist parties worldwide.

It has been involved in a number of events, such as a 2013 protest against the Golden Dawn in Chicago, a 2014 meeting on Ukraine and a protest against Donald Trump at the 2016 Republican National Convention. A significant program of the American Party of Labor is "Red Aid: Service to the People", which involves providing food, clothing and other assistance to the poor and homeless in impoverished communities, and has been established in multiple US cities.

Its current organ, The Red Phoenix, carries articles concerning contemporary political issues and theoretical and historical questions.

==== Communist Party USA ====
Established in 1919, the Communist Party USA (CPUSA) claimed a membership of 100,000 in 1939 and maintained a membership over 50,000 until the 1950s. However, the 1956 invasion of Hungary, McCarthyism and investigations by the House Unamerican Activities Committee (HUAC) contributed to its steady decline despite a brief increase in membership from the mid-1960s. Its estimated membership in 1996 was between 4,000 and 5,000. From the 1940s, the FBI attempted to disrupt the CPUSA, including through its Counter-Intelligence Program (COINTELPRO).

Several Communist front organizations founded in the 1950s continued to operate at least into the 1990s, notably the Veterans of the Abraham Lincoln Brigade, the American Committee for the Protection of Foreign Born, the Labor Research Association, the National Council of American-Soviet Friendship, and the U.S. Peace Council. Other groups with less direct links to the CPUSA include the National Lawyers Guild, the National Emergency Civil Liberties Committee, and the Center for Constitutional Rights. Many leading members of the New Left, including some members of the Weather Underground and the May 19th Communist Organization were members of the National Lawyers Guild. However, the CPUSA's attempts to influence the New Left were mostly unsuccessful. The CPUSA attracted media attention in the 1970s with the membership of the high-profile activist, Angela Davis.

The CPUSA publishes the People's World and Political Affairs. Beginning in 1988, the CPUSA stopped running candidates for President of the United States. After the fall of the Soviet Union in 1991, it was found that the Soviet Union had provided funding to the CPUSA throughout its history. The CPUSA had always supported the positions of the Soviet Union.

==== Freedom Road Socialist Organization ====
The Freedom Road Socialist Organization (FRSO) was founded in 1985 through the mergers of Maoist and Marxist–Leninist organizations active near the end of the New Communist Movement. The FRSO grew out of an initial merger of the Proletarian Unity League and the Revolutionary Workers Headquarters. Some years later, the Organization for Revolutionary Unity and the Amilcar Cabral/Paul Robeson Collective merged into the FRSO.

In 1999, the FRSO split into two organizations, both of which retain the FRSO name to this day. The split primarily concerned the organization's continued adherence to Marxism–Leninism, with one side of the FRSO upholding Marxism–Leninism and the other side preferring to pursue a strategy of regrouping and rebuilding the left in the United States. These organizations are commonly identified through their publications, which are Fight Back! News and Freedom Road, and their websites, (frso.org) and (freedomroad.org), respectively.

In 2010, members of the FRSO (frso.org) and other anti-war and international solidarity activists were raided by the FBI. Secret documents left by the FBI revealed that agents planned to question activists about their involvement in the FRSO (frso.org) and their international solidarity work related to Colombia and Palestine. The FRSO (frso.org) works in the committee to Stop FBI Repression.

Both FRSO groups continue to uphold the right of national self-determination for African Americans and Chicanos. The FRSO (frso.org) works in the labor movement, the student movement, and the oppressed nationalities movement.

==== Party for Socialism and Liberation ====
The Party for Socialism and Liberation was formed in 2004 as a result of a split in the Workers World Party. The San Francisco, Los Angeles and Washington, D.C. branches left almost in their entirety and the party has grown significantly since then. The new party took control of the Workers World Party front organization Act Now to Stop War and End Racism (A.N.S.W.E.R.) at the time of the split.

Following the 2010 Deepwater Horizon oil spill in the Gulf of Mexico, A.N.S.W.E.R. organized the "Seize BP" campaign, which organized demonstrations calling for the U.S. federal government to seize BP's assets and place them in trust to pay for damages.

The PSL has also been active in the antiracist movement, participating in protests across the country throughout 2020. Several organizers in their Denver branch were arrested for their involvement in protests against the death of Elijah McClain.

==== Progressive Labor Party ====
The Progressive Labor Party (PL) was formed as the Progressive Labor Movement in 1962 by a group of former members of the Communist Party USA, most of whom had quit or been expelled for supporting China in the Sino-Soviet split. To them, the Soviet Union was imperialist. They competed with the CP and SWP for influence in the anti-war movement and the Students for a Democratic Society (SDS), forming the May 2 Movement as its anti-war front organization. Its major publications are Progressive Labor and the Marxist–Leninist Quarterly. They later abandoned Maoism, refusing to follow the line of any foreign country and formed the front group, the International Committee Against Racism (InCAR), in 1973. Much of their activity included violent confrontations against far-right groups, such as Nazis and Klansmen. While membership in 1978 was about 1,500, by 1996 it had fallen below 500.

==== Revolutionary Communist Party, USA ====
Formed in 1969 as the Bay Area Revolutionary Union (BARU), the Revolutionary Communist Party (RCP) had almost one thousand members in twenty-five states by 1975. Its main founder and long-time leader, Bob Avakian, a Students for a Democratic Society (SDS) organizer had fought off attempts for control of the SDS by the Progressive Labor Party. The party has been unwaveringly Maoist. Working through the U.S.-China Peoples Friendship Association, the party arranged for visits by Americans to China. Their newspaper, Revolutionary Worker has featured articles supportive of Albania and North Korea, while the party, unusually for the left, has been hostile to school busing, the Equal Rights Amendment (ERA), and gay rights. The party fell out of favour with the Chinese government after the death of Mao Zedong, partly because of the personality cult of the RCP leader. By the mid-1990s the party numbered fewer than 500 members.

==== Workers World Party ====
The Workers World Party (WWP) was formed in 1958 by fewer than one hundred people who left the Socialist Workers Party after the SWP supported socialists in New York State elections. Their publication is Workers World. The party's position has developed from Trotskyism to independent Marxism–Leninism, supporting all Marxist states. They have been active in organizing protests against far-right groups. They were also notable for being the main US supporter of the former Ethiopian communist government. In the 1990s their membership was estimated at 200.

Their front group, Act Now to Stop War and End Racism (A.N.S.W.E.R.) organized the early protests against the war in Iraq, which brought hundreds of thousands of protesters to Washington, D.C. before the war had even begun. However, following a split in the party in 2004, some members left to form the Party for Socialism and Liberation, taking leadership of A.N.S.W.E.R. with them. The Workers World Party then formed the Troops Out Now Coalition.

=== Trotskyism ===
Many Trotskyist parties and organizations exist that advocate communism. These groups are distinct from Marxist–Leninist groups in that they generally adhere to the theory and writings of Leon Trotsky. Many owe their organizational heritage to the Socialist Workers Party, which emerged as a split-off from the CP.

==== Freedom Socialist Party ====
The Freedom Socialist Party began in 1966 as the Seattle branch of the Socialist Workers Party that had split from the party and joined with others who had not belonged to the SWP. They differed with the SWP on the role of African Americans, whom they saw as being the future vanguard of the revolution, and of women, emphasizing their rights, which they called "socialist feminism". Clara Fraser came to lead the party and was to form the group Radical Women.

==== Revolutionary Communists of America ====
The Revolutionary Communists of America (RCA) are the US Section of the Revolutionary Communist International (RCI) (formerly International Marxist Tendency or IMT). They are a Trotskyist party founded in 2024, with their preceding organization having existed in the US since 2002. The RCA are inspired by the theories of Karl Marx, Friedrich Engels, Vladimir Lenin, and Leon Trotsky, as well as British Trotskyist Ted Grant, and publish a regular newspaper called The Communist (formerly Socialist Appeal and Socialist Revolution). The party-affiliated publishing house is called Marxist Books. The party argues for a break with the Democrats and Republicans, advocates for political class-independence of the working class based on a socialist program and aims to build a capable revolutionary leadership.

==== International Socialist Organization ====
The International Socialist Organization (ISO) was a group founded in 1977 as a section of the International Socialist Tendency (IST). The organization held Leninist positions on imperialism and considered itself a vanguard party, preparing the ground for a revolutionary party to hypothetically succeed it. The organization held a Trotskyist critique of nominally socialist states, which it considered class societies. In contrast to this, the ISO advocated the tradition of "socialism from below". It was strongly influenced by the perspectives of Hal Draper and Tony Cliff. It broke from the IST in 2001 but continued to exist as an independent organization for the next eighteen years.

The ISO emphasized educational work on the socialist tradition. Branches also took part in activism against the Iraq War, against police brutality, against the death penalty, and in labor strikes, among other social movements. At its peak in 2013, the group had as many as 1500 members. The organization argued that it was the largest revolutionary socialist group in the United States at that time. The ISO found itself in crisis early 2019, largely stemming from a scandal over the leadership's response to a 2013 sexual misconduct case. The ISO voted to dissolve itself in March 2019.

==== Socialist Action ====
Socialist Action was formed in 1983 by members, almost all of whom had been expelled from the Socialist Workers Party. Its members remained loyal to Trotskyist principles, including "permanent revolution", that they claimed the SWP had abandoned. Strongly critical of authoritarian regimes, including the Soviet Union and Iran, it championed socialist revolution in third world countries. It was an active participant in the Cleveland Emergency National Conference in September 1984, set up to challenge American policy in Central America, and played a major role in organizing demonstrations against American action against the Sandinista rebels in Nicaragua.

==== Socialist Alternative ====
Although Socialist Alternative has sometimes pursued a democratic socialist strategy, most notably in Seattle where Kshama Sawant was elected to the Seattle City Council as an openly socialist candidate in 2013., it identifies as a Trotskyist political organization. Socialist Alternative is the U.S. affiliate of the International Socialist Alternative, which is a Brussels-based international of Trotskyist political parties.

==== Socialist Equality Party ====
The Socialist Equality Party (SEP) is a political party that formed after a 1964 ideological rupture with Socialist Workers Party over the issue of their support of the Fidel Castro government in Cuba, The SEP are composed of Trotskyists and are affiliated with the World Socialist Web Site.

==== Socialist Workers Party ====
With fewer than one thousand members in 1996, the Socialist Worker's Party (SWP) was the second-largest Marxist–Leninist party in the United States. Formed by supporters of Leon Trotsky, they believed that the Soviet Union and other Communist states remained "worker's states" and should be defended against reactionary forces, although their leadership had sold out the workers. They became members of the Trotskyist Fourth International. Their publications include The Militant and a theoretical journal, the International Socialist Review. Two groups that broke with the SWP in the 1960s were the Spartacist League and the Workers League (which would later evolve into the Socialist Equality Party). The SWP has been involved in numerous violent scuffles. In 1970 the party successfully sued the FBI for COINTELPRO, where the FBI opened and copied mail, planted informants, wiretapped members' homes, bugged conventions, and broke into party offices. The party fields candidates for President of the United States.

==== Solidarity ====
Solidarity is a socialist organization associated with the journal Against the Current. Solidarity is an organizational descendant of International Socialists, a Trotskyist organization based on the proposition that the Soviet Union was not a "degenerated workers' state" (as in orthodox Trotskyism) but rather "bureaucratic collectivism", a new and especially repressive class society.

==== Spartacist League ====
The Spartacist League was formed in 1966 by members of the Socialist Workers Party who had been expelled two years earlier after accusing the SWP of adopting "petty bourgeois ideology". Beginning with a membership of around 75, their numbers dropped to 40 by 1969 although they grew to several hundred in the early 1970s, with Maoists disillusioned with China's new foreign policy joining the group.

The League saw the Soviet Union as a "deformed workers' state", and supported it over some policies. It is committed to Trotskyist "permanent revolution", rejecting Mao's peasant guerilla warfare model. The group's publication is Workers Vanguard. Much of the group's activity has involved stopping Ku Klux Klan and Nazi rallies.

== Notable figures and current publications ==
=== People ===
- Ed Asner – actor
- Paul Auster – writer
- Bob Avakian – chairman of the Revolutionary Communist Party, USA
- Bill Ayers – co-founder and co-leader of the Weather Underground
- John Bachtell – chairman of the Communist Party USA
- General Baker – leader of the League of Revolutionary Black Workers
- Roger Nash Baldwin – founding member of the ACLU
- Jack Barnes – Socialist Workers Party leader
- Harry Belafonte – singer, civil rights and social activist
- Edward Bellamy – utopian socialist author
- Victor L. Berger – Socialist Party of America congressman
- Grace Lee Boggs – Chinese-American Marxist
- James Boggs – African-American Marxist
- Murray Bookchin – anarchist and libertarian socialist theorist
- Earl Browder – Communist Party leader
- James P. Cannon – leader of the Socialist Workers Party
- Chevy Chase – comedian
- Cesar Chavez – United Farm Workers leader
- Noam Chomsky – linguistics academic and anarchist activist
- John Cusack – actor
- Angela Davis – Communist Party leader
- Dorothy Day – founding member of the Catholic Worker Movement
- Claudia De la Cruz – Activist, Educator, Party for Socialism and Liberation candidate in 2024
- Daniel De Leon – Marxist theoretician and newspaper editor
- Eugene V. Debs – Socialist Party of America leader and presidential candidate
- David Dellinger – Socialist Party of America leader and pacifist
- Ron Dellums – Socialist congressman from California
- Farrell Dobbs – leader of the Socialist Workers Party
- Hal Draper – Young Peoples Socialist League leader and socialist intellectual
- W. E. B. Du Bois – Sociologist, historian, and civil rights activist
- Barbara Ehrenreich – co-chair of Democratic Socialists of America
- Albert Einstein – physicist
- Jane Fonda – New Left antiwar activist, actor, CED founder, climate activist
- William Z. Foster – Communist Party leader
- Al Franken – comedian and former Senator
- David Graeber - anarchist, academic, and Occupy Wall Street organizer
- Gil Green – Young Communist and Communist Party USA leader
- Danny Glover – American actor
- Emma Goldman – anarchist activist
- Laurence Gronlund – utopian socialist author
- Horace Greeley – Utopian socialist newspaper editor, representative and Presidential candidate
- Gus Hall – Communist Party leader and presidential candidate
- Dashiell Hammett – author
- Fred Hampton – Black Panther
- Michael Harrington – democratic socialist activist
- Howie Hawkins – cofounder of Green Party US and 2020 presidential candidate of both it and SPUSA
- Tom Hayden – New Left activist and California assemblyman
- Bill Haywood – IWW labor activist
- Chris Hedges – dissident academic and Presbyterian Minister
- Alger Hiss – State Department official, accused Soviet spy
- Abbie Hoffman – Yippie activist
- Irving Howe – democratic socialist activist
- Mary Harris "Mother" Jones – IWW labor activist
- Tom Kahn – social democratic, civil rights and labor activist
- Helen Keller – author and activist
- Martin Luther King Jr. – civil rights activist
- Gloria La Riva – ten-time perennial presidential candidate for the Workers World Party and the Party for Socialism and Liberation
- Jack London – author
- Meyer London – Socialist Party of America congressman
- Vito Marcantonio – Socialist congressman from New York
- Sam Marcy – chairman of the Workers World Party
- Abby Martin – American journalist, documentary filmmaker
- Michael Moore – award-winning documentary filmmaker, author, podcaster
- A. J. Muste – pacifist, labor and civil rights activist
- Immanuel Ness – labor activist
- Huey P. Newton – leader of the Black Panther Party
- David North – World Socialist Web Site
- Alexandria Ocasio-Cortez – Representative for New York's 14th congressional district and democratic socialist
- Robert Dale Owen – Utopian socialist, Indiana politician
- Michael Parenti – academic
- Sean Penn – actor
- Hasan Piker - political commentator, streamer
- A. Philip Randolph – civil rights and labor leader
- Adolph L. Reed Jr. – political scientist, academic, and Marxist
- John Reed – journalist
- Paul Robeson – actor, civil rights and labor activist
- Tim Robbins – actor
- Franklin D. Roosevelt – 32nd President of the United States
- Jerry Rubin – Yippie activist
- Mark Ruffalo – actor
- Bayard Rustin – pacifist and civil rights activist
- C. E. Ruthenberg – Communist Party leader
- Bernie Sanders – Independent democratic socialist Senator and Democratic presidential candidate in the 2016 and 2020 presidential elections
- Margaret Sanger – reproductive rights and labor activist
- Susan Sarandon – actor
- Kshama Sawant – Trotskyist activist and member of the Seattle City Council
- Max Shachtman – Marxist theorist and activist
- Assata Shakur – Member of the Black Panther Party and Black Liberation Army
- Irwin Silber – Marxist journalist
- Upton Sinclair – author and socialist politician
- Jill Stein – Green Party presidential candidate
- I. F. Stone – journalist
- Oliver Stone – director
- Paul Sweezy – Marxist economist and journalist
- Norman Thomas – Socialist Party of America leader and presidential candidate
- Benjamin Tucker – anarchist and libertarian socialist thinker
- Mark Twain – author
- Henry A. Wallace – Former Vice President and presidential candidate of the Progressive Party in 1948.
- Cornel West – dissident academic
- Tim Wohlforth – Trotskyist leader
- Richard D. Wolff – academic
- Malcolm X – civil rights activist
- Howard Zinn – academic

=== Publications ===
- The New Hampshire Gazette, fortnightly, press run 5,500, founded 1756.
- The Nation, weekly, established 1865. Circulation 190,000.
- The Progressive, monthly, established 1909.
- Monthly Review, monthly, established 1949. Circulation 7,000.
- Dissent, quarterly, established 1954.
- Texas Observer, established 1954.
- Fifth Estate, quarterly, established 1965.
- Review of Radical Political Economics, quarterly, established 1968.
- Dollars & Sense, bimonthly, established 1974.
- Mother Jones, bimonthly, established 1974.
- In These Times, monthly, established 1976. Circulation 17,000.
- Z Magazine, monthly established 1977. Circulation 10,000 print and 6,000 online subscribers.
- Labor Notes, monthly, established 1979.
- Utne Reader, bimonthly, established 1984. Circulation 150,000.
- Left Business Observer, established 1986.
- The American Prospect, monthly, established 1990. Circulation 55,000.* The Baffler, established 1988.
- CounterPunch, semi-monthly, established 1994.
- CrimethInc., anarchist publishing collective established 1996.
- Working USA, quarterly, established 1997.
- The Indypendent, published 17 times per year, established 2000.
- Truthout, website, established 2001.
- Left Turn, website, established 2001.
- Socialist Revolution (formerly Socialist Appeal), established 2001.
- Black Commentator, web-only weekly, established 2002.
- Jacobin, established 2010.
- It's Going Down, established 2016.

== Public officeholders ==
=== American Communist Party ===
==== Vermont and Iowa ====
Year	Candidate	Office	Area	District	Votes	%	Result	Notes	Ref
2024	Christopher Helali	High bailiff	Orange County, Vermont	At-Large	446	2.50%	Won	Write-in candidate	
2025	Addison Aronson	Arts & Cultural Affairs Commission member	Dubuque, Iowa	At-Large	4	66.67%	Won	Applicant	

=== Communist Party USA ===
==== Wisconsin ====
1. Wahsayah Whitebird – Member of the Ashland, Wisconsin city-council.

=== Green Party of the United States ===
There have been at least 65 officeholders for the Green Party of the United States.

==== Arkansas ====
1. Alvin Clay – Justice of the Peace Mississippi County, District 6 Elected: 2012
2. Kade Holliday – County Clerk Craighead County, Arkansas Elected: 2012
3. Roger Watkins – Constable Craighead County, District 5 Elected: 2012

==== California ====
1. Dan Hamburg – Board of Supervisors, District 5, Mendocino County
2. Bruce Delgado – Mayor, Marina (Monterey County)
3. Larry Bragman – Town Council, Fairfax (Marin County)
4. Renée Goddard – Town Council, Fairfax (Marin County)
5. John Reed – Town Council, Fairfax (Marin County)
6. Gayle Mclaughlin – City Council, Richmond (Contra Costa)
7. Deborah Heathersone – Town Council, Point Arena (Mendocino County)
8. Paul Pitino – Town Council, Arcata (Humboldt County)
9. John Keener – City Council, Pacifica (San Mateo County)
10. Vahe Peroomian – Board of Trustees, Glendale Community College District, Glendale (Los Angeles County)
11. Amy Martenson – Board of Trustees, District 2, Napa Valley College, Napa (Napa County)
12. April Clary – Board of Trustees, Student Representative, Napa Valley College, Napa (Napa County)
13. Heather Bass – Board of Directors, Gilroy Unified School District, Gilroy, Santa Clara County
14. Dave Clark – Board of Directors, Cardiff School District (San Diego County)
15. Phyllis Greenleaf – Board of Trustees, Live Oak Elementary School District (Santa Cruz County)
16. Adriana Griffin – Red Bluff Union School District, Red Bluff (Tehama County)
17. Jim C. Keller – Board of Trustees, Bonny Doon Union Elementary School District, Santa Cruz County
18. Brigitte Kubacki – Governing Boardmember, Green Point School, Blue Lake (Humboldt County)
19. Jose Lara – Vice President and Governing Board Member, El Rancho Unified School District, Pico Rivera (Los Angeles)
20. Kimberly Ann Peterson – Board of Trustees, Geyserville Unified School District (Sonoma County)
21. Karen Pickett – Board Member, Canyon Canyon Elementary School District (Contra Costa County)
22. Kathy Rallings – Board of Trustees, Carlsbad Unified School District, Carlsbad, San Diego County
23. Sean Reagan – Governing Boardmember, Norwalk-La Mirada Unified School District, Norwalk (Los Angeles County)
24. Curtis Robinson – Board of Trustees, Area 6, Marin County Board of Education (Marin County)
25. Christopher Sabec – Governing Boardmember, Lagunitas School District (Marin County)
26. Katherine Salinas – Governing Boardmember, Arcata School District, Arcata (Humboldt County)
27. Jeffrey Dean Schwartz – Governing Boardmember, Arcata School District, Arcata (Humboldt County)
28. Alex Shantz – Board of Trustees, St. Helena Unified School District, Napa County
29. Dana Silvernale – Governing Boardmember, North Humboldt Union High School (Humboldt County)
30. Jim Smith – President, Canyon School Board, Canyon Township (Contra Costa County)
31. Logan Blair Smith – Little Shasta Elementary School District, Montague (Shasta County)
32. Rama Zarcufsky – Governing Boardmember, Maple Creek School District (Humboldt County)
33. John Selawsky – Rent Stabilization Board, Berkeley (Alameda County)
34. Jesse Townley – Rent Stabilization Board, Berkeley (Alameda County)
35. Jeff Davis – Board of Directors, Alameda-Contra Costa Transit District (Alameda and Contra Costa Counties)
36. Karen Anderson – Board of Directors, Coastside Fire Protection District (San Mateo County)
37. Robert L. Campbell – Scotts Valley Fire District (Santa Cruz County)
38. William Lemos – Fire Protection District, Mendocino (Mendocino County)
39. Russell Pace – Board of Directors, Willow Creek Fire District (Humboldt County)
40. John Abraham Powell – Board of Directors, Montecito Fire District, Montecito (Santa Barbara County)
41. Larry Bragman – Board of Directors, Division 3, Marin Municipal Water District Board (Marin County)
42. James Harvey – Board of Directors, Montara Water and Sanitary District (San Mateo County)
43. Randy Marx – Board of Directors, Fair Oaks Water District, Division 4 (Sacramento County)
44. Jan Shriner – Board of Directors, Marina Coast Water District (Monterey County)
45. Kaitlin Sopoci-Belknap – Board of Directors, Humboldt Bay Municipal Water District, Division 1 (Humboldt County)
46. James Barone – Boardmember, Rollingwood-Wilart Recreation and Parks District (Contra Costa County)
47. William Hayes – Board of Directors, Mendocino Coast Park and Recreation District (Mendocino County)
48. Illijana Asara – Board of Directors, Community Service District, Big Lagoon (Humboldt County)
49. Gerald Epperson – Board of Directors, Crocket Community Services District, Contra Costa County
50. Joseph Gauder – Boardmember, Covelo Community Services District, Covelo (Mendocino County)
51. Crispin Littlehales – Boardmember, Covelo Community Services District, Covelo (Mendocino County)
52. George A. Wheeler – Board of Directors, Community Service District, McKinleyville (Humboldt County)
53. Mathew Clark – Board of Directors, Granada Sanitary District (San Mateo County)
54. Nanette Corley – Director, Resort Improvement District, Whitehorn (Humboldt County)
55. Sylvia Aroth – Outreach Officer, Venice Neighborhood Council, Los Angeles (Los Angeles County)
56. Robin Doyno – At-Large Community Officer, Mar Vista Neighborhood Council, Los Angeles (Los Angeles County)
57. Janine Jordan – District 4 Business Representative, Mid-Town North Hollywood Neighborhood Council, Los Angeles (Los Angeles County)
58. Jack Lindblad – At Large Community Stakeholder, North Hollywood Northeast Neighborhood Council, Los Angeles (Los Angeles County)
59. Johanna A. Sanchez – Secretary, Historic Highland Park Neighborhood Council, Los Angeles (Los Angeles County)
60. Johanna A. Sanchez – At-Large Director, Historic Highland Park Neighborhood Council, Los Angeles (Los Angeles County)
61. Marisol Sanchez – Area 1 Seat, Boyle Heights Neighborhood Council, Los Angeles (Los Angeles County)
62. William Bretz – Crest/Dehesa/Harrison Canyon/Granite Hill Planning Group (San Diego County)
63. Claudia White – Member, Descanso Community Planning Group (San Diego County)
64. Annette Keenberg – Town Council, Lake Los Angeles (Los Angeles County)
65. Rama Zarcufsky – Governing Boardmember, Maple Creek School District (Humboldt County)

=== Socialist Alternative ===
==== Washington ====
1
Election year	No. of Seattle City Council members	% of Seattle City Council members	+/-
2013	0 / 9	0	
2015	1 / 9	11.11	
2019	1 / 9	11.11	

1. Kshama Sawant – Seattle City Council, Position 2

=== Socialist Party USA ===
==== New Jersey ====
1
Election year	No. of Red Bank Regional High School Board of Education members	% of Red Bank Regional High School Board of Education members	+/-
2012	0 / 9	0	
2015	1 / 9	11.11	

1. Pat Noble – Member of the Red Bank Regional High School Board of Education for Red Bank

=== Vermont Progressive Party ===
1. David Zuckerman – Lieutenant Governor
2. Doug Hoffer – State Auditor
3. Tim Ashe – Pro Tem of the Vermont Senate
4. Chris Pearson – Member of the Vermont Senate
5. Anthony Pollina – Member of the Vermont Senate
6. Mollie S. Burke – Member of the Vermont House of Representatives
7. Robin Chesnut-Tangerman – Member of the Vermont House of Representatives
8. Diana Gonzalez – Member of the Vermont House of Representatives
9. Sandy Haas – Member of the Vermont House of Representatives
10. Selene Colburn – Member of the Vermont House of Representatives
11. Brian Cina – Member of the Vermont House of Representatives
12. Jane Knodell – Burlington City Council President (Central District)
13. Max Tracy – Burlington City Council (Ward 2)
14. Sara Giannoni – Burlington City Council (Ward 3)
15. Wendy Coe – Ward Clerk (Ward 2)
16. Carmen Solari – Inspector of Elections (Ward 2)
17. Kit Andrews – Inspector of Elections (Ward 3)
18. Jeremy Hansen – Berlin Select Board
19. Steve May Richmond Select Board
20. Susan Hatch Davis – Former Member of the Vermont House of Representatives
21. Dexter Randel Former Member of the Vermont House of Representatives & Former Troy Select Board
22. Bob Kiss – Former Mayor of Burlington
23. Peter Clevelle – Former Mayor of Burlington
24. David Van Deusen – Former Moretown Select Board & Former First Constable

=== Working Families Party ===
==== Connecticut ====
1. Ed Gomes – Member of the Connecticut Senate from the 23rd district

==== New York ====
1. Diana Richardson – Member of the New York State Assembly from the 43rd district
2. Zohran Mamdani - Mayor of New York City

== See also ==
- African-American leftism
- Anti-war movement
- British left
- Espionage Act of 1917
- Fourth-wave feminism
- Handschu agreement
- History of the socialist movement in the United States
- House Un-American Activities Committee
- Jewish left
- Left-libertarianism
- Liberalism in the United States
- Millennial socialism
- Modern liberalism in the United States
- New Left
- Pink tide
- Progressivism in the United States
- Red Scare
- Regressive left
- Tankie

== Bibliography ==
- ALB (2009–10) "The SLP of America: a premature obituary?" Socialist Standard. Retrieved 2010-05-11.
- Alexander, Robert J. International Trotskyism, 1929–1985: a documented analysis of the movement. United States of America: Duke University Press, 1991. ISBN 0-8223-0975-0
- Amster, Randall. Contemporary Anarchist Studies: An Introductory Anthology of Anarchy in the Academy. Oxford, UK: Taylor & Francis, 2009 ISBN 0-415-47402-7
- Archer, Robin. Why Is There No Labor Party in the United States?. Princeton, NJ: Princeton University Press, 2007. ISBN 978-0-691-12701-9
- Bérubé, Michael. The Left at War. New York: New York University Press, 2009 ISBN 0-8147-9984-1
- Buhle, Mari Jo; Buhle, Paul and Georgakas, Dan. Encyclopedia of the American left (Second edition). Oxford: Oxford University Press, 1998. ISBN 0-19-512088-4
- Busky, Donald F. Democratic Socialism: A Global Survey. Westport: Praeger Publishers, 2000. ISBN 0-275-96886-3
- Coleman, Stephen. Daniel De Leon. Manchester, UK: Manchester University Press, 1990 ISBN 0-7190-2190-1
- Draper, Theodore. The Roots of American Communism. New York: Viking Press, 1957. ISBN 0-7658-0513-8
- Drucker, Peter (1994). Max Shachtman and His Left: A Socialist's Odyssey Through the "American Century". Humanities Press. ISBN 0-391-03816-8.
- George, John; Wilcox, Laird (1996). American Extremists: Militias, Supremacists, Klansmen, Communists & Others (2nd ed.). Amherst: Prometheus Books. ISBN 1-57392-058-4.
- Graeber, David. "The Rebirth of Anarchism in North America, 1957–2007" in Contemporary history online, No. 21, (Winter, 2010)
- Horowitz, Rachelle (2007). "Tom Kahn and the Fight for Democracy: A Political Portrait and Personal Recollection" (PDF). Democratiya (Merged with Dissent in 2009). 11. Archived from the original (PDF) on October 12, 2009.
- Isserman, Maurice. The Other American: The Life of Michael Harrington. New York: Public Affairs, 2000. ISBN 1-58648-036-7
- Klehr, Harvey. Far Left of Center: The American Radical Left Today. New Brunswick, NJ: Transaction Publishers, 1988. ISBN 0-88738-875-2
- Liebman, Arthur. Jews and the Left. New York: John Wiley and Sons, 1979. ISBN 978-0-471-53433-4
- Lingeman, Richard. The Nation Guide to the Nation. New York: Vintage Books, 2009. ISBN 0-307-38728-3
- Lipset, Seymour Martin and Marks, Gary. It Didn't Happen Here: Why Socialism Failed in the United States. New York: W. W. Norton & Company, Inc. 2001. ISBN 0-393-04098-4
- [Reuters]. "U.S. Protests Shrink While Antiwar Sentiment Grows". Reuters, Oct. 3, 2007. Retrieved September 20, 2010.
- Ryan, James G. Earl Browder: The Failure of American Communism. Tuscaloosa, Alabama and London: The University of Alabama Press, 1997. ISBN 0-8173-0843-1
- Sherman, Amy. "Demonstrators to Gather in Fort Lauderdale to Rail Against Oil Giant BP", the Miami Herald. May 12, 2010 Retrieved from SunSentinel.com September 22, 2010.Demonstrators to gather in Fort Lauderdale to rail against oil giant BP
- Stedman, Murray Salisbury Jr., and Stedman, Susan W. Discontent at the Polls: A Study of Farmer and Labor Parties, 1827–1948. New York: Columbia University Press. 1950. Russell & Russell edition.
- Woodcock, George, Anarchism: A History of Libertarian Ideas and Movements. Toronto: University of Toronto Press, 2004. ISBN 1-55111-629-4
