= Boston Social Forum =

The Boston Social Forum was the first North American social forum to use the methodology of the World Social Forum process and adhere closely to its Charter of Principles. It was held at the University of Massachusetts Boston in Boston, Massachusetts, in the United States from July 23-25, 2004, and coordinated by the Boston-based labor-community network, the Campaign on Contingent Work (later renamed Massachusetts Global Action). CCW executive director Jason Pramas was the lead organizer of the forum.

Over 5,000 people from over 300 community organizations and labor unions participated in more than 550 workshops, plenary sessions, and convocations at the event--which was timed to take place just before the 2004 Democratic National Convention, also being held in Boston. The majority of attendees came from the Northeast of the United States, but a large minority came from around North America, and there were delegations from over a dozen other countries (with simultaneous translation available in as many languages).

Numerous cultural events were also part of the proceedings, the largest being a show at the famed Middle East Restaurant in nearby Cambridge featuring UK punk troubadour Billy Bragg, actor Chris Cooper, filmmaker John Sayles, and nearly 30 other acts and featured guests. In the leadup to the forum, singer Michelle Shocked, comedians Jimmy Tingle and Barry Crimmins, and many other artists and performers lent their talents to the effort--as did noted historian Howard Zinn and linguist Noam Chomsky.

Simultaneously a local and a regional social forum within the World Social Forum process, the Boston Social Forum was a place for left-wing activists to strategize and network with (and educate) each other across the spectrum of human knowledge in a convivial environment--united in the belief that "Another World is Possible".

According to its organizers:

[the Boston Social Forum] was called to help progressive activists to begin to answer some very basic questions: What kind of future do we want for Boston? For our region? For our nation? For the world? What is our vision of a better society?

Through a series of workshops, cultural events, plenary sessions, and giant convocations of the entire forum, we encouraged progressive organizations of all kinds to showcase their best analysis of the present, and their best ideas for the future, across the breadth of human knowledge—politics, economics, science and technology, culture and faith—in the context of corporate globalization.

The goals of the event were simple: encourage various social movements to exchange information, network with one another, form new alliances, and push our movements forward a bit more towards the next stage of our development.

We wanted to do our part to help progressives seize the high ground of ideas in this society, and then, having captured people's imaginations, move forward to become a more significant political force.

Like their counterparts at sibling social forums, the Boston Social Forum organizers subscribed to the idea that the corporate-driven neoliberal ideology of runaway capitalism in the economic realm coupled with growing restrictions on democracy in the political realm were quite literally destroying the planet (at least for human life. . .). They also believed that the left-wing has important ideas in politics, economics, science and technology, culture and faith that could help save the planet, and build a human-centered, democratic and ecological society that will be capable of taking our species to the next phase of our evolution.

By bringing together a broad array of left-wing activists and interested members of the public just before a large gathering of the Democratic Party--one of the two major political parties in the United States--organizers believed that the Boston Social Forum would demonstrate that the left-wing was a growing political force in the United States and worldwide, that it had good ideas, and that politically uncommitted people should consider joining its ranks.

Critics within the World Social Forum process had previously thought that it would not be possible to hold a significant social forum in the United States given its history of American Exceptionalism and because they thought that the United States, as the main imperialist power of its day, did not have large enough social movements to provide a grassroots base for a major social forum.

Boston Social Forum organizers believe they proved their critics wrong, and that their forum's success showed that the World Social Forum process could and should flower in the United States (and Canada).

== See also ==
- World Social Forum
- European Social Forum
- Southern Africa Social Forum
- Southeast Social Forum
- US Social Forum
- World Economic Forum
