= Babels =

Volunteer translators network

Babels is an international network of volunteer interpreters and translators that was born out of the European Social Forum (ESF) process and whose main objective is to cover the interpreting needs of the various Social Forums. It is a horizontal, non-hierarchical network, with no permanent structures of any kind.

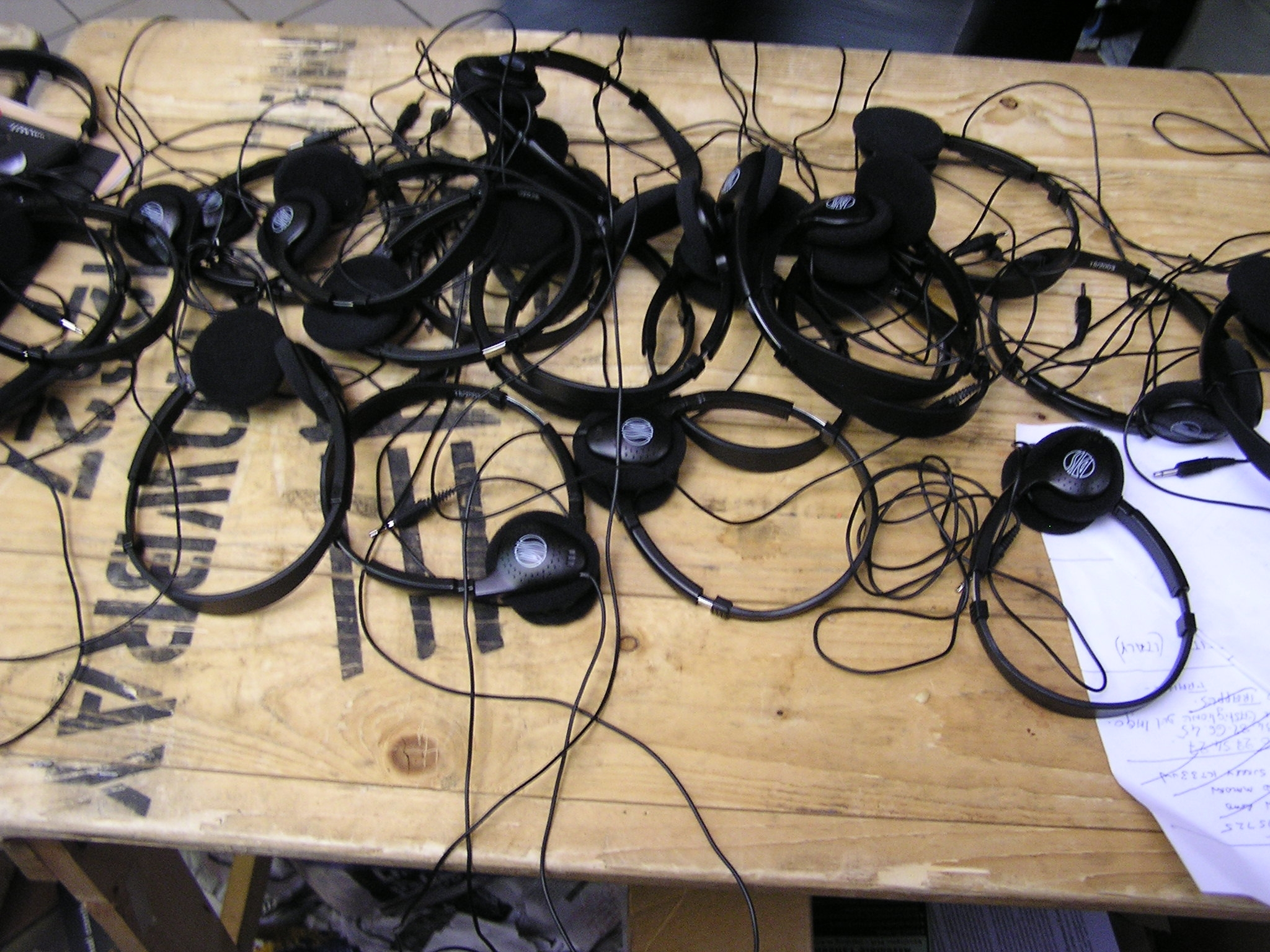
Headsets for instantaneous translation at London ESF

Babels originated in the process of preparation for the 2002 ESF, a left-wing conference of the anti-globalization movement held in Florence. A small network of 'communication activists' associated with ATTAC France proposed that the conference use only volunteers to interpret the various languages of the speakers for the audience. There was some debate about the quality of volunteer translators but the cost of professionals helped sway the argument. A last-minute call went out for volunteers to which 600 people responded and which finally resulted in around 350 volunteer interpreters and translators for the Forum. The group had no official space to work from and little funds so had to squat a medieval tower.

After the first ESF the organisers of the translation formed Babels groups in France and Italy and groups also sprang up in Germany, the UK, and Spain. These groups went on to participate in counter G8 conferences in Evian and Annemasse.

For the second ESF in Paris organisers gave Babels £200,000 funding, offices facilities and a longer preparation period. Over 1000 Babelistas (Babels translation volunteers) took part in the translation.

The Babels organisation went on to provide translation for the ESF's global partner the World Social Forum (WSF) in Mumbai and the first Social Forum of the Americas in Ecuador and the third ESF in London.

Babels describes itself as "not a provider of linguistic services" but rather "a political actor" and will not work on any project unless it has been involved in contributing to the definition of the project with its ideas and demands.

== Bibliography ==
- Boéri, Julie. (2009). "Babels, the Social Forum and the Conference Interpreting Community: overlapping and competing narratives on activism and interpreting in the era of globalisation". New Voices in Translation Studies, 5(1). 10.14456/nvts.2009.9
- Sachse, J. (2022). "Babels und das Europäische Sozialforum". In: Konferenzdolmetschen für soziale Bewegungen. TRANSÜD. Arbeiten zur Theorie und Praxis des Übersetzens und Dolmetschens. Frank & Timme, Berlin. 10.57088/978-3-7329-9127-3_4
- Doerr, N. (2008). "Deliberative discussion, language, and efficiency in the World Social Forum process". Mobilization: An International Quarterly, 13(4), 395-410.
- Brander de la Iglesia, M. (2010). "Teaching and learning conference interpreting for humanitarian purposes: breaking the codes at social forums". Current Trends in Translation Teaching and Learning, 59-78.
