= European Social Forum =

Recurring alter-globalization conference

The European Social Forum (ESF) was a recurring conference held by members of the alter-globalization movement (also known as the global justice movement). In the first few years after it started in 2002 in Florence, the conference was held every year, but later it became biannual due to difficulties with finding host countries. The conference was last held in 2010. It aimed to allow social movements, trade unions, NGOs, refugees, peace and anti-imperial groups, anti-racist movements, environmental movements, networks of the excluded and grassroots organizers from Europe and the world to come together and discuss themes linked to major European and global issues, in order to coordinate campaigns, share ideas, and refine organizing strategies. It emerged from the World Social Forum and adhered to the Charter of Principles.

== First ESF ==
The first forum was held in Florence in November 2002. The slogan was "Against war, racism and neo-liberalism," with specific reference to US president George W. Bush's plan for regime change in Iraq. The Assembly of Social Movements held directly after the ESF launched a call for a Europe-wide day of action against the incipient Iraq War. The call was echoed by the Assembly of Social Movements held after the World Social Forum a few months later and eventually led to the "largest protest event in human history", the 15 February Global day of action against the war.

Before its opening the ESF created a large political debate between different Tuscan local personages. The President of the Region, Claudio Martini, although criticised on some points by no-global activists, had been a supporter of the movement since the time of the Genoa Group of Eight Summit protest on one side and the right-wing Italian government on the other. People feared that the ESF could provoke riots and accidents such as those of the Genoa Group of Eight Summit protest, from 18 July to 22 July 2001. Florentine individuals, such as journalist Oriana Fallaci, intervened in the debate. Fallaci invited the people of Florence to shut down their shops and stay at home. She also compared the ESF to the Nazi occupation of Florence. Other opponents of the ESF included Giovanni Sartori, a political scientist and liberal critic of Silvio Berlusconi, and Franco Zeffirelli, a filmmaker known for his right-wing views. Another group of intellectuals from various political strands defended the ESF and signed an appeal favourable to the meeting. Among them was journalist Tiziano Terzani and a group of academics critical of Berlusconi.

Ultimately, the EFS, which took place at the historical Fortezza da Basso and attracted 60,000 delegates, proceeded smoothly and did not provoke any incidents. The EFS ended with a huge demonstration against the war, which the organizers reported was attended by 1,000,000 people. The debate on peace and pacifism considered the most important debate ion the session, although the program of the Forum included a large spectrum of issues: (immigration, European Union's constitution, the Tobin Tax and many others). Gino Strada, president of Emergency, the Italian association that helps civil victims of armed conflicts, and a leader of the pacifist movement, was one of the most popular orators. Some large NGOs such as Amnesty International joined the ESF, together with more radical groups such as ATTAC and the left-wing parliamentarians. At the end of the meeting, even pro-globalists such as the then president of the European Commission Romano Prodi showed sympathy for the moderation of the movement and for its pacifist stance.

A network of volunteer translators, Babels, was set up to interpret the event into the various languages of the people attending.

== Second ESF ==
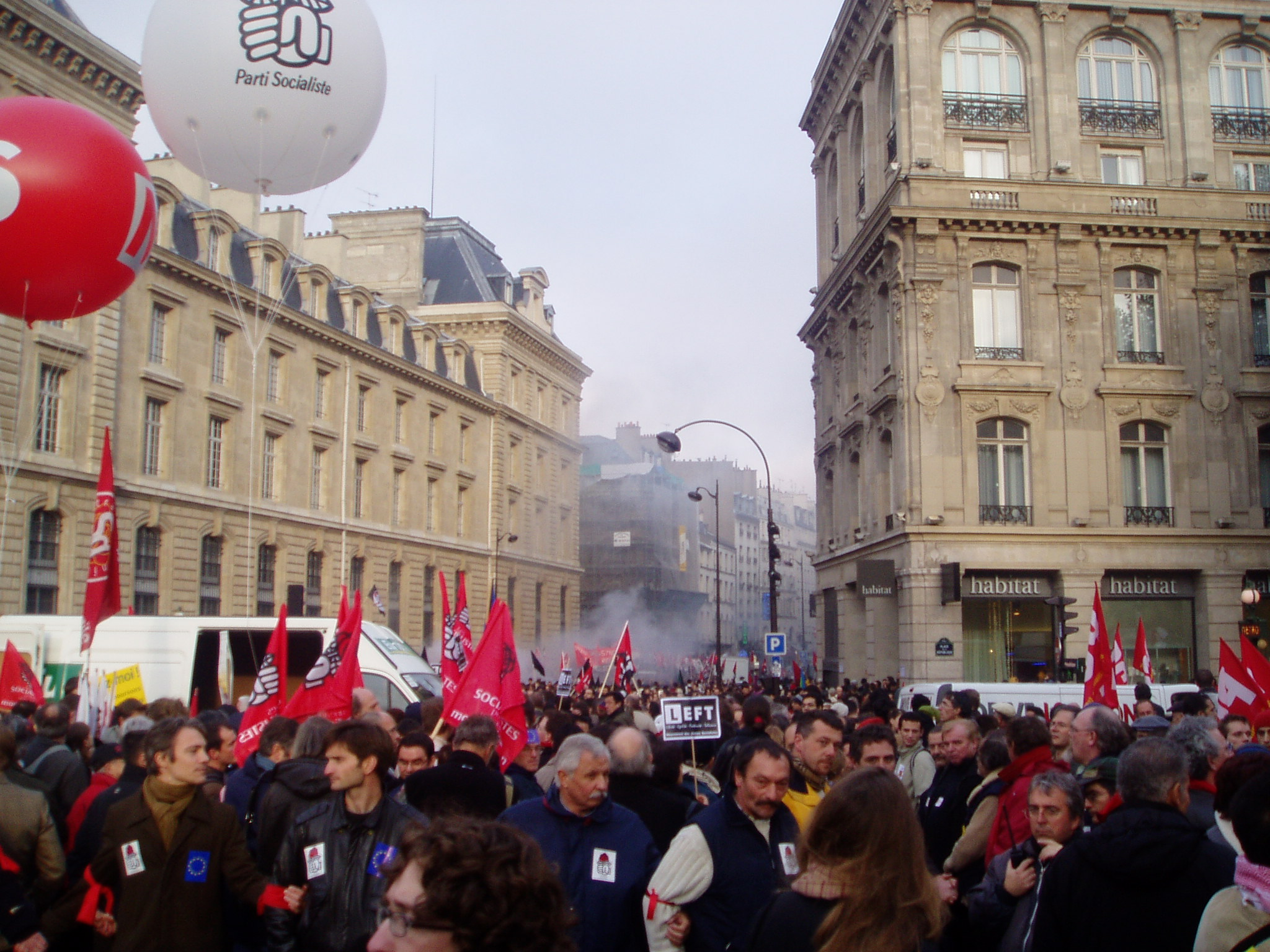
The demonstration at the ESF in Paris 2003

The second European Social Forum was held in Paris in November 2003.

Organizers claim that over 50,000 people attended and that around 150,000 marched in the demonstration held on the last day.

In France there has been some criticism of the organization for not being open enough. The participation of the French Socialist Party, the Parti Socialiste, also generated a lot of criticism, because the party was a proponents of market liberalization in the 1990s, but the most prominent group at the event was the Ligue Communiste Revolutionnaire.

Some anarchist groups organised a rival event in the city at the same time, while a women's forum was held in the days preceding the social forum, in order to counteract the perceived under-representation of women at the first ESF. It is claimed that over 3,000 women attended.

== Third ESF ==
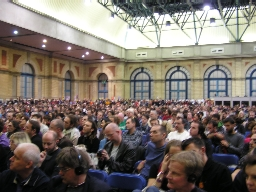
One of many packed meetings at the ESF 2004

The third European Social Forum was held in London, mostly at Alexandra Palace but also with events throughout the Bloomsbury area of London on the 15–17 October 2004.

The organisers claimed that approximately 25,000 people took part in 500 plenaries, seminars, workshops, and cultural events, which were addressed by over 2,500 speakers. Participants came from across the continent and even from beyond the boundaries of European Union.

This forum showed a marked increased in participation from minority groups such as black, Asian, Muslim, and refugee networks. More women were represented on the speaker platforms than in previous forums. The forum also included for the first time a three-day cultural programme organised through open submission through the ESF website.

Well known participants and speakers included Ahmed Ben Bella, the leader of the Algerian resistance to French rule, Dr Aleida Guevara, daughter of Che, George Galloway, a leading figure in the UK anti-war movement, and Dr Mustafa Barghouti from Palestine. Activist writers such as Susan George, John Pilger and George Monbiot were prominent, and Gerry Adams was one of many Irish figures speaking. The Forum opened with a rally in Southwark Cathedral.

Unlike the Paris forum, in London there was initially no money provided to pay for events. Funding eventually came from the Greater London Authority and the Mayor's office (Ken Livingstone and his officers, many of whom are in Socialist Action), several Trade Unions such as NATFHE (the college lecturer's union), AMICUS (a largely technical and industrial union), the Transport and General Workers Union (T&G) and UNISON (the UK's largest public sector union), which provided funds, office space, subsidised tickets for unemployed and asylum seeker attendees and paid for some of the meeting space at Alexandra Palace.

The British Socialist Workers Party, Globalise Resistance, the Tobin Tax Network and the Campaign for Nuclear Disarmament were central to bringing the event to London.

Other groups, for instance the London Social Forum, felt that the main organizing approach was too top-down and instead set up "horizontally" organised fringe events. These were known as the 'autonomous' or 'beyond' ESF events. Participants ranged from non-governmental organisations, to political parties such as the Green Party, to unaligned anarchists and socialists.

The Millennium Dome was turned into a giant hostel for over 5,000 participants to sleep in during the course of the event.

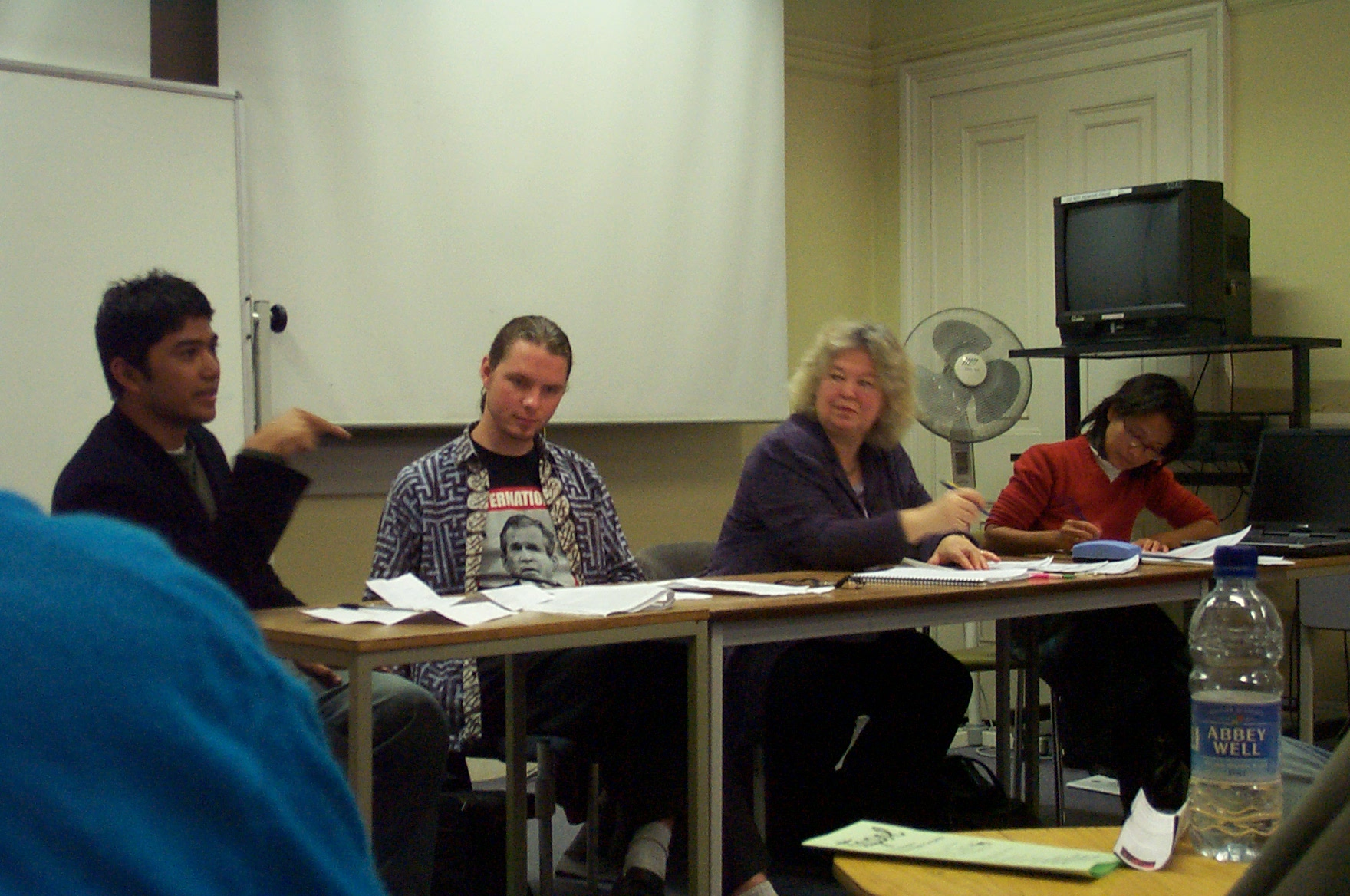
Jean Lambert MEP (Green, London) inter alios at the School of Oriental and African Studies during a fringe meeting of the ESF on the situation in Aceh, October 15, 2004. An Italian Senator Francesco Martone from the Greens was also in the audience (not shown).

Subhi al Mashadani, the leader of the Iraqi Federation of Trade Unions, was due to speak in a meeting on the Iraq war, but never got to speak. He was shouted down by some members of the audience who felt he was collaborating with the occupation and who surged towards the stage when he attempted to address the 2,000 strong audience. The ESF's security took no chances and dragged a furious Mashadani from the stage for his own protection. The "End the Occupation" session was stopped, a first in the history of the ESF.

Later in the day an intervention was made by some of those who had been involved with the autonomous spaces during a meeting on anti-fascism. They intended to invade the stage during the speech of the Mayor of London Ken Livingstone (who opposed the invasion of Iraq in 2003 but is a member of the Labour Party which supported it). In fact, Ken Livingstone had already decided not to speak at the event. His decision has been attributed by the National Assembly Against Racism to threats from anarchists but the intervention went ahead. The SWP's Weyman Bennett, a steering member of Unite Against Fascism and chair of the meeting, claimed that he was assaulted by an anarchist. A banner was hung up stating "Ken's Party - War Party" and the stage was turned into an open-microphone event with speeches against the 'vertical' organisation of the ESF, the war in Iraq, and recent attacks on freedom of speech by the FBI (such as taking Indymedia servers down with international articles). After the intervention, the originally planned meeting about anti-fascism went ahead but with a reduced audience. These events echoed the attempts by anarchists to attack French Socialist Party speakers in the Paris forum, an attack that was stopped by security.

The end of the forum saw a massive international demonstration through central London and a rally at Trafalgar Square. However, the Metropolitan Police arrested a number of anarchists on their way to this event. Javier Ruis was arrested at the Rally itself. He subsequently claimed that the West Essex Zapatista were responsible for the threats against Ken Livingstone, claiming that this was an example of Neoist Invisible Theatre. The size of the rally was seen as a sign of its success as an event, though many European critics noted that all of the speakers were British and chosen by the British organisers. Estimations of the numbers present ranged from 70,000 to 100,000 people. Speakers called for an end to war, racism and privatisation. They advocated peace and social justice for Europe.

== Fourth ESF ==
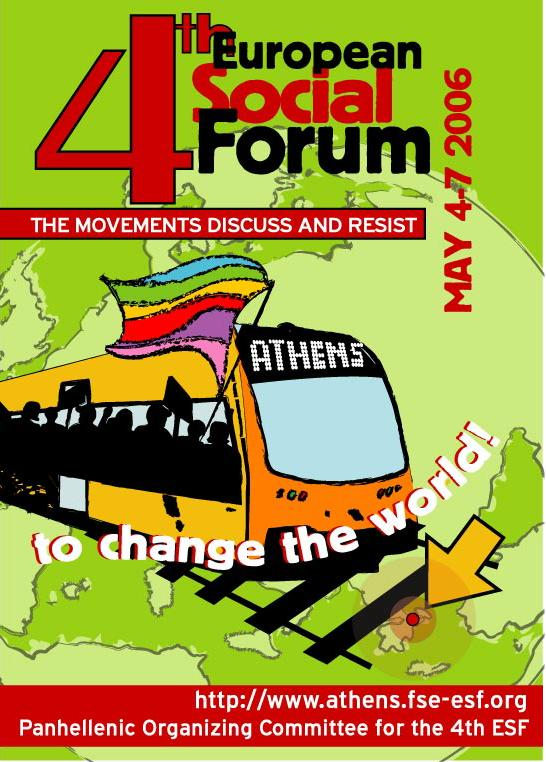
Athens ESF poster

The fourth European Social Forum was held in Athens, Greece on 4–7 May 2006. According to the organizers, more than 35,000 registered. The demonstration on 7 May, Saturday afternoon, was announced by the media to have a participation of 80,000 demonstrators, a record in Athens since the anti-war mobilisation on February 15, 2003.

== Fifth ESF ==
The fifth European Social Forum was held in Malmö, Sweden on 17–21 September 2008. Approximately 20,000 people were expected to participate in the forum.

== Sixth ESF ==
The sixth European Social Forum was held in Istanbul, Turkey, on 1–4 July 2010.

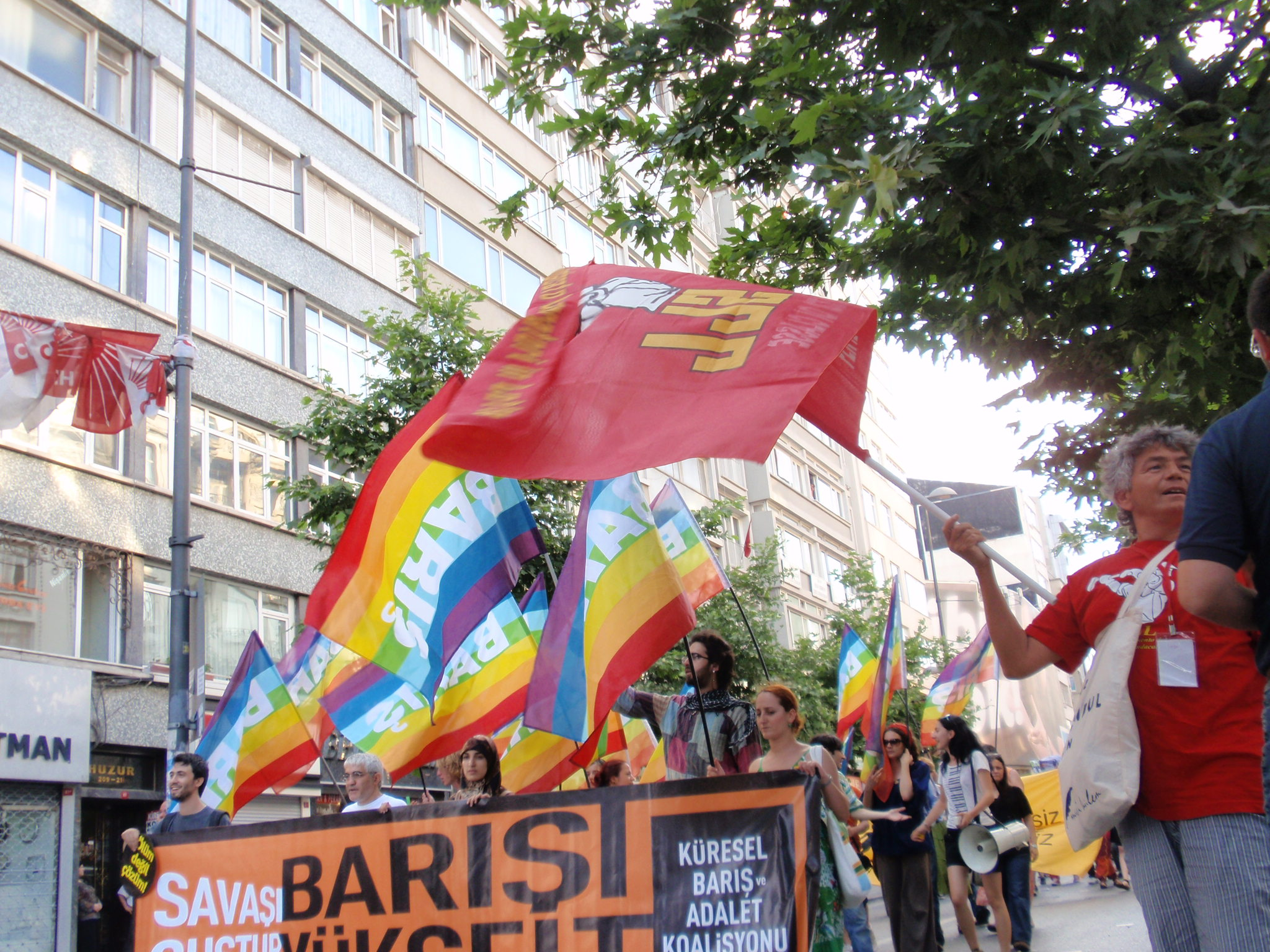
İstanbul

== Criticism ==
As a major political event that brings together highly diverse social movements from across Europe, the ESF has been praised and criticized by various actors, both inside and outside the Forum. While outsiders, especially the mainstream media, tend to focus on "scandalous" singular events, groups, or persons and interpret them as representative for the ESF as a whole, insiders have mainly criticized various aspects of the ESF organizing process.

=== Criticism in relation to the fifth ESF (Malmö) ===
In the demonstration after the European Social Forum 2008 in Malmö, controversial political figures such as Abdullah Öcalan and Fidel Castro were praised by some demonstrators. 300 of the demonstrators were masked, although it was forbidden. Some demonstrators attempted to break a bank window and threw bottles and stones.

The liberal Swedish daily Sydsvenskan considered it "disgusting" that the ESF 2008 hosted a panel discussion on how ”imperialism and zionism” use list of terrorist organizations to weaken "freedom movements, leftist organizations and solidarity groups" in "Palestina, Basque, Colombia, Greekland, Turkey, Belgium and Denmark". These lists contain Basquean ETA, Colombian FARC, Kurdish PKK and previously also Palestinian PLO and PLFP. The seminar was organized by Mikael ”micro” Cromsjö, whose blogs host "unholy alliances of right and left extremism". According to the seminar summary, a secret elite alliance has been pursuing Global Order with a single money, government and army, for hundreds if not thousands of years.

=== Criticism in relation to anti-capitalist positions ===
According to Sydsvenskan, the countries that have permitted "free trade and liberal politics", "have seen poverty and need decline, in some cases dramatically". "As the NGOs of rich countries oppose globalization by signs, slogans and stone storms in the name of poor countries, Africans and Asians call for more free trade, capitalism and globalization." According to a study by the "respected Pew Research Center" of 40,000 people, almost everywhere, particularly in Africa and Asia, a majority of people has a positive attitude on globalization".

== See also ==
- World Social Forum
