= Local to Global Justice =

- Formation: 2002; 23 years ago
- Type: Nonprofit
- Headquarters: Tempe, Arizona
- Website: https://localtoglobal.org/

Local to Global Justice is a volunteer organization based in Tempe, Arizona, United States. It sponsors events dealing with social justice issues, mostly held on and around the Arizona State University (ASU) Tempe campus. The group is a registered ASU student organization, but membership is not limited to students at the university.

== Activities ==
Every year since 2002 the group has organized the Local to Global Justice Teach-in at the ASU Tempe campus. The free event is a social forum featuring nationally recognized speakers, workshops by local grassroots organizations, music, and food. The speakers and workshops at the Teach-in have dealt with a wide variety of topics, including civil rights, environmental justice, workers' rights, globalization, and immigration.

Well-known speakers at past events have included Starhawk, Ward Churchill, Rod Coronado, Jonathan Schell, Frances Moore Lappé, Lisa "Tiny" Gray-Garcia, Michael Alewitz and Tom Hayden.

== See also ==
- Law Society of Massachusetts
