= Francesco Martone =

Italian politician (born 1961)

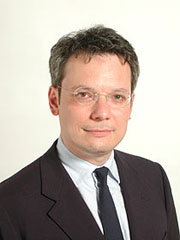
Image of Francesco Martone Senato

Francesco Martone (10 May 1961) is an Italian politician. He was an Italian Senator from 2001 to 2008. From 1988 to 1995 he worked for Greenpeace International.
