= Southeast Social Forum =

The Southeast Social Forum was a gathering of about 550 people that took place in Durham, North Carolina, from June 16 to June 18, 2006, at North Carolina Central University. The attendees were people of all ages, and were mostly members of organizations from around the Southeastern United States dealing with issues of racism, economic justice, globalization, and inequality. About 30% of attendees were black, about 30% were white, and about 30% were Latino or Latina.

The purpose of the gathering was twofold. First, the gathering was designed to plan and build momentum for the first-ever US Social Forum. An event that was held in Atlanta, Georgia in June 2007. Second, the gathering was designed to bring together activists, organizers, indigenous people, working people, and people of color from around the Southeast United States in order to build informal and formal networks that could unite around common goals of social justice. Organizations from about 15 states were represented at the event.

== History and background ==
The Southeast Social Forum grew out of the World Social Forum process that began in Porto Alegre, Brazil, in 2001. Between 2001 and 2006, the Social Forum process had spread to numerous countries around the world. However, some organizers in the World Social Forum process had felt that the United States was not ready for a Social Forum—although this belief was contested, and ultimately disproven by the success of the Boston Social Forum in July 2004. It was eventually decided that there was a definite need to begin a national Social Forum process in the US, since many social justice activists believe that the world's most serious social problems are being continually worsened by the policies of the US government and US companies. The US Social Forum in Atlanta was originally slated for 2006, but following Hurricane Katrina, it was moved to 2007 and organizers decided that a 2006 gathering would take place somewhere in the Southeast to help build momentum toward the 2007 event.

Atlanta, Knoxville, and Durham were considered as sites for the 2006 meeting. A group of organizers in Durham agreed to commit to help host the event. This group, which became known as the North Carolina Local Host Committee, met from January to June 2006 to plan the event. Much of the planning for the event outside of North Carolina took place in Atlanta, where efforts were spearheaded by Project South.

Organizers frequently rejected the designations "event" and "conference" for the gathering, stating that the Southeast Social Forum is most appropriately considered a step in the process of movement-building.

== Details of the Gathering ==
About 5% of the gathering's attendees spoke Spanish but not English, and translation services were provided at most points in the program for these attendees. While foundations supplied some support for the event, nearly all of the work that went into the process was done by volunteers.

The event included workshops and plenary sessions dealing with topics such as building alliances among groups, combatting white supremacy, organizing against corporate globalization, and many other topics. The 3-day gathering was followed on June 19 by a smaller meeting of about 40 people specifically focused on planning for the 2007 US Social Forum in Atlanta.

== References and external links ==
- Press Release from NC Central University
- Loose schedule for SESF (Outline only)
