= African Social Forum =

African anti-neoliberal social movement

The African Social Forum is an African social movement opposed to neo-liberal economic policies in Africa and what they see as the exploitation of the African continent in a framework of neo-liberal globalisation.

The idea for the African Social Forum originated at the World Social Forum in Porto Alegre (Brazil) from 25 to January 30, 2001, upon the recognition that of the 14,000 representatives, only 50 were from Africa. The first Forum was held in 2002 in Bamako, Mali, with 45 countries represented. The Bamako Declaration approved at the 2002 forum include the following:

A strong consensus emerged at the Bamako Forum that the values, practices, structures and institutions of the currently dominant neo-liberal order are inimical to and incompatible with the realization of Africa's dignity, values, and aspirations...
The Forum demands of its political leaders that they do not further inflict on Africa the unjust system of the Bretton Woods institutions in the name of financing Africa's development.

The motto of the African Social Forum, adopted from the WSF, is "Another Africa is possible".

== Aims ==
The aims of the movement as listed on their website are as follows:

- To consolidate the capacities of analysis, proposal and mobilization of the organizations of the African social movement so that they can fully play their part in Africa and within the world social movement,
- To build an African space of concerted development of alternatives to néo-liberal globalization, starting from a diagnosis of its social, economic and political effects,
- To define strategies of social, economic and political rebuilding, including a redefinition of the role of the State, market and organizations citizens,
- To define the methods of control citizen so that political alternation supports the expression and the implementation of alternative answers, credible and viable.
