= Southern Africa Social Forum =

SASF Logo

The Southern African Social Forum(SASF) was a Social Forum conference held in a different Southern Africa county each year.

It is organised in the spirit of the World Social Forum but is not organized by the WSF Secretariat or the International Council

The SASF emerged from the Africa Social Forum (ASF) which was held in Mali in 2001 and Ethiopia in 2002. At the Ethiopia ASF it was agreed in Forums needed to be organised on a more local level. Amongst other things this was to overcome problems of prohibitive transport costs.

== 2003 ==
The 2003 SASF was held on the 9–12 November 2003 in Lusaka Zambia under the banner “Another Southern Africa is Possible”. Approximately 400 people participated.

At the forum motions were passed stating that The Forum "the globalisation process, dominated by the giant transnational corporations from the North, is impacting negatively on the people [of Southern Africa]" and that the New Economic Plan for African Development (NEPAD) should be rejected "as an expression of support by certain leaders of our continent for the world’s elite at the expense of the majority".

== 2005 ==
The 2005 SASF took place in Harare Zimbabwe. It had the largest participation so far with around 4,000 people taking part. Participants came from South Africa, Botswana, Mozambique, Malawi, Lesotho, Swaziland and Zimbabwe

The event organisers had been put under pressure from the Zimbabwean police who warned speakers that any criticism of Robert Mugabe would lead to the event being closed down. But by the end of the meeting, buoyed by the size of the participation, speakers were denouncing Mugabe. According to Charie Kimber, writing in the Socialist Worker "Half of the watching police were nodding along in agreement".

The speakers at the event were critical of Capitalism itself as well as of the region's governments. One popular chant was "phansi capitalism" (down with capitalism) and "viva socialism".
