= List of diplomatic missions of South Korea =

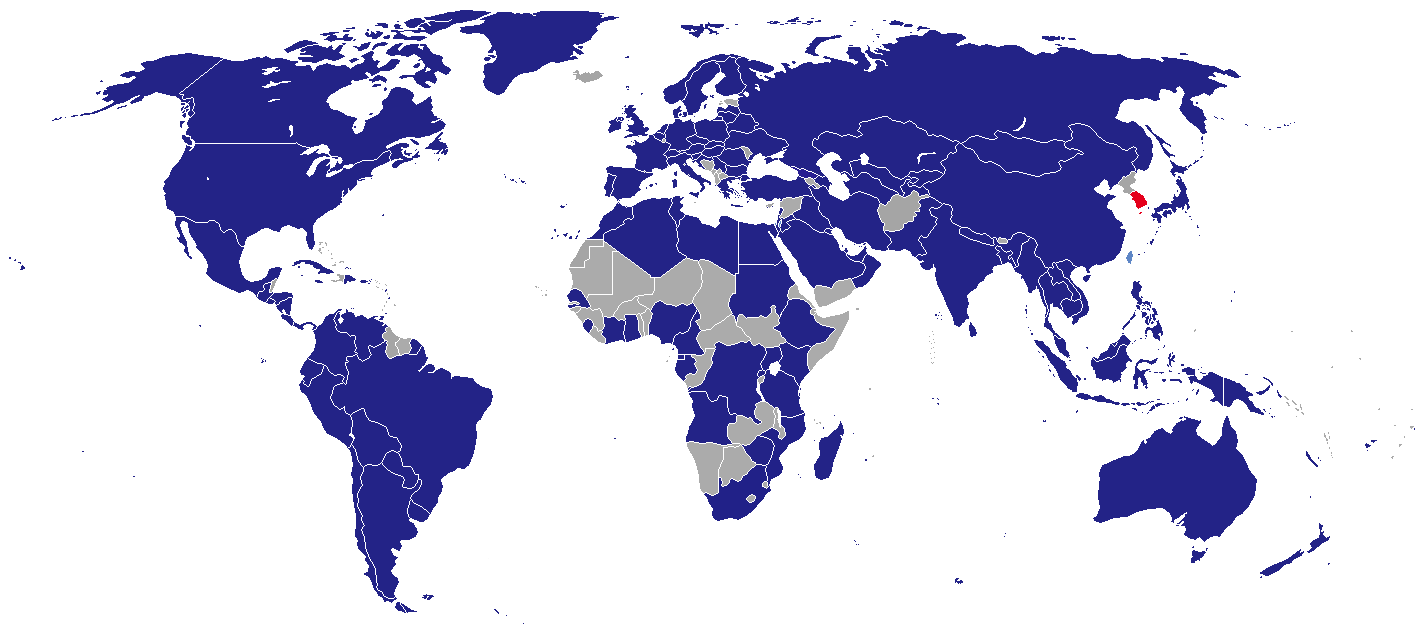
A map of South Korean diplomatic missions throughout the world. Blue marks countries with missions.

The following is a list of diplomatic missions of South Korea. Diplomatic missions of the South Korea shall be established in foreign countries under the jurisdiction of the Minister of Foreign Affairs to take partial charge of diplomatic or consular affairs under the control of the Ministry of Foreign Affairs. Diplomatic missions of South Korea shall be classified into Embassy (Korean: 대사관), Representative Office (대표부) and Consulate-General (총영사관). According to the Act on the Establishment of Diplomatic missions abroad of South Korea, Consulate (분관) and Consular Office (출장소) may be established in the missions, as prescribed by Presidential Decree, if necessary to assign the said offices with affairs under the jurisdiction of the missions.

== History ==
In the 1980s the Roh Tae-woo administration gradually initiated diplomatic links with Warsaw Pact countries, in a policy known as Nordpolitik. This led to the opening of representative offices and later embassies in socialist regimes in Europe and Asia. The Asian economic crisis of the late 1990s and an export-orientated trade policy led to South Korea to rationalize its diplomatic network. However, after bouncing back from the crisis, South Korea continues to open and re-open diplomatic missions in many countries. With neither North Korea or South Korea recognizing the sovereignty of the other state, nor the legitimacy of each other's governments, there are no South Korean diplomatic missions in North Korea.

== Current missions ==
=== Africa ===
Host country	Host city	Mission	Concurrent accreditation	Ref.
Algeria	Algiers	Embassy		
Angola	Luanda	Embassy	Countries: Namibia	
Cameroon	Yaoundé	Embassy	Countries: Central African Republic; Chad	
Congo-Kinshasa	Kinshasa	Embassy	Countries: Congo-Brazzaville	
Egypt	Cairo	Embassy		
Equatorial Guinea	Malabo	Embassy office (Note: Subordinate to the embassy in Libreville)		
Ethiopia	Addis Ababa	Embassy	Countries: Djibouti; Seychelles; International Organizations: African Union	
Gabon	Libreville	Embassy	Countries: Equatorial Guinea; São Tomé and Príncipe	
Ghana	Accra	Embassy	Countries: Benin; Togo	
Ivory Coast	Abidjan	Embassy	Countries: Burkina Faso; Niger	
Kenya	Nairobi	Embassy	Countries: Somalia; International Organizations: United Nations; United Nations Environment Programme; United Nations Human Settlements Programme	
Libya	Tripoli	Embassy		
Madagascar	Antananarivo	Embassy	Countries: Comoros; Mauritius	
Morocco	Rabat	Embassy	Countries: Mauritania	
Mozambique	Maputo	Embassy	Countries: Eswatini	
Nigeria	Abuja	Embassy		
Nigeria	Lagos	Embassy office		
Rwanda	Kigali	Embassy	Countries: Burundi	
Senegal	Dakar	Embassy	Countries: Cape Verde; Gambia; Guinea; Guinea-Bissau; Mali	
Sierra Leone	Freetown	Embassy	Countries: Liberia	
South Africa	Pretoria	Embassy	Countries: Botswana; Lesotho	
Tanzania	Dar es Salaam	Embassy		
Tunisia	Tunis	Embassy		
Uganda	Kampala	Embassy		
Zimbabwe	Harare	Embassy	Countries: Malawi; Zambia	

=== Americas ===
Host country	Host city	Mission	Concurrent accreditation	Ref.
Argentina	Buenos Aires	Embassy		
Bolivia	La Paz	Embassy		
Brazil	Brasília	Embassy		
Brazil	São Paulo	Consulate-General		
Canada	Ottawa	Embassy	International Organizations: International Civil Aviation Organization (Note: The South Korean consulate-general in Montreal is accredited to ICAO.)	
Canada	Montreal	Consulate-General	International Organizations: International Civil Aviation Organization	
Canada	Toronto	Consulate-General	International Organizations: International Civil Aviation Organization	
Canada	Vancouver	Consulate-General	International Organizations: International Civil Aviation Organization	
Chile	Santiago de Chile	Embassy		
Colombia	Bogotá	Embassy		
Costa Rica	San José	Embassy		
Cuba	Havana	Embassy		
Dominican Republic	Santo Domingo	Embassy	Countries: Antigua and Barbuda; Bahamas; Dominica; Haiti; Saint Kitts and Nevis	
Ecuador	Quito	Embassy		
El Salvador	San Salvador	Embassy	Countries: Belize	
Guatemala	Guatemala City	Embassy		
Honduras	Tegucigalpa	Embassy		
Jamaica	Kingston	Embassy	International Organizations: International Seabed Authority	
Mexico	Mexico City	Embassy		
Nicaragua	Managua	Embassy		
Panama	Panama City	Embassy		
Paraguay	Asunción	Embassy		
Peru	Lima	Embassy		
Trinidad and Tobago	Port of Spain	Embassy	Countries: Barbados; Grenada; Saint Lucia; Saint Vincent and the Grenadines; International Organizations: Association of Caribbean States	
United States	Washington, D.C.	Embassy	International Organizations: Organization of American States (Note: Accredited as an observer mission.)	
United States	Washington, D.C.	Consulate-General	International Organizations: Organization of American States	
United States	Atlanta	Consulate-General	International Organizations: Organization of American States	
United States	Boston	Consulate-General	International Organizations: Organization of American States	
United States	Chicago	Consulate-General	International Organizations: Organization of American States	
United States	Honolulu	Consulate-General	International Organizations: Organization of American States	
United States	Houston	Consulate-General	International Organizations: Organization of American States	
United States	Los Angeles	Consulate-General	International Organizations: Organization of American States	
United States	New York City	Consulate-General	International Organizations: Organization of American States	
United States	San Francisco	Consulate-General	International Organizations: Organization of American States	
United States	Seattle	Consulate-General	International Organizations: Organization of American States	
United States	Anchorage	Consulate	International Organizations: Organization of American States	
United States	Dallas	Consulate	International Organizations: Organization of American States	
United States	Hagåtña	Consulate	International Organizations: Organization of American States	
United States	Philadelphia	Consulate	International Organizations: Organization of American States	
Uruguay	Montevideo	Embassy		
Venezuela	Caracas	Embassy	Countries: Guyana; Suriname; International Organizations: Caribbean Community	

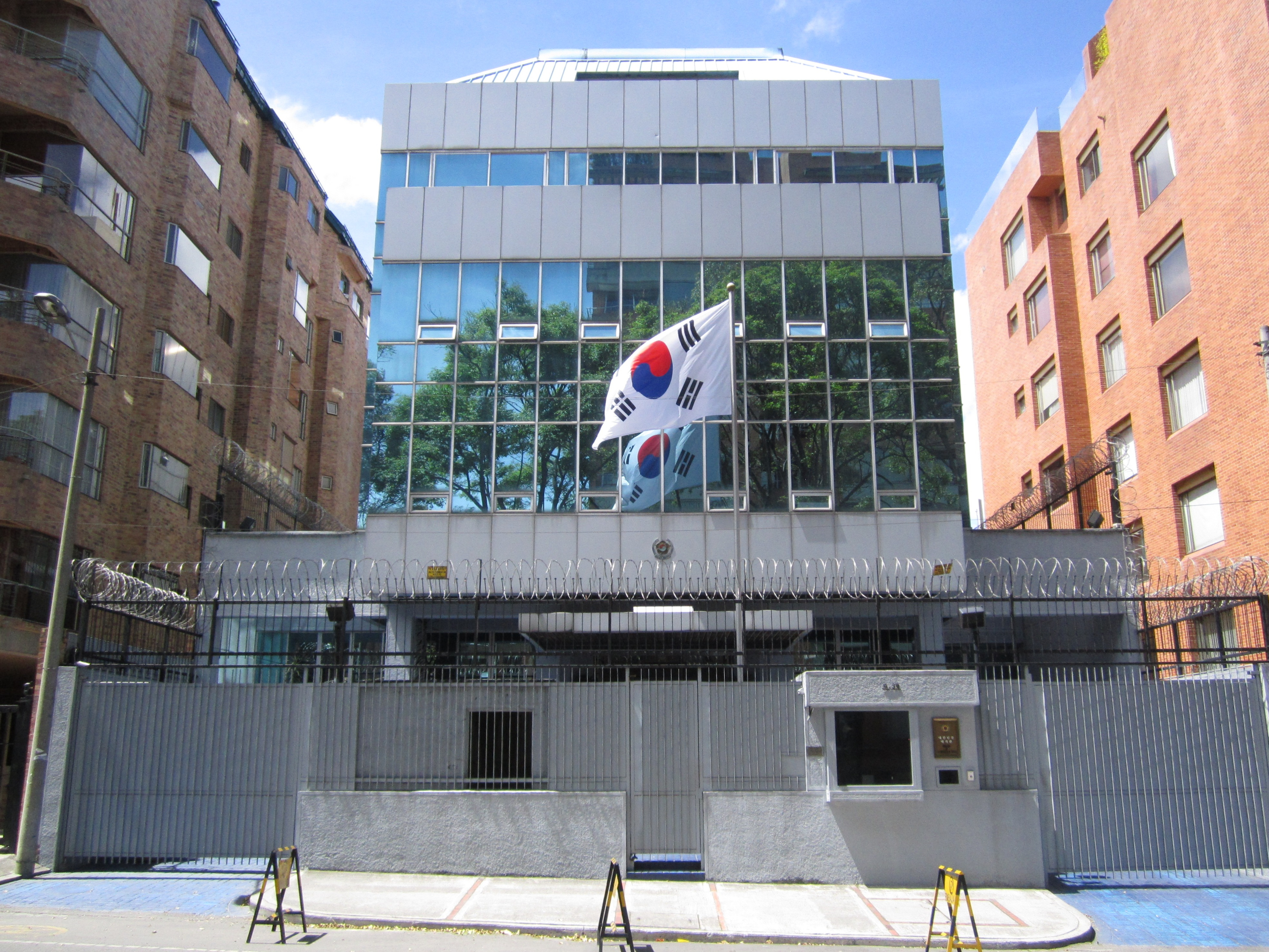
Embassy in Bogotá

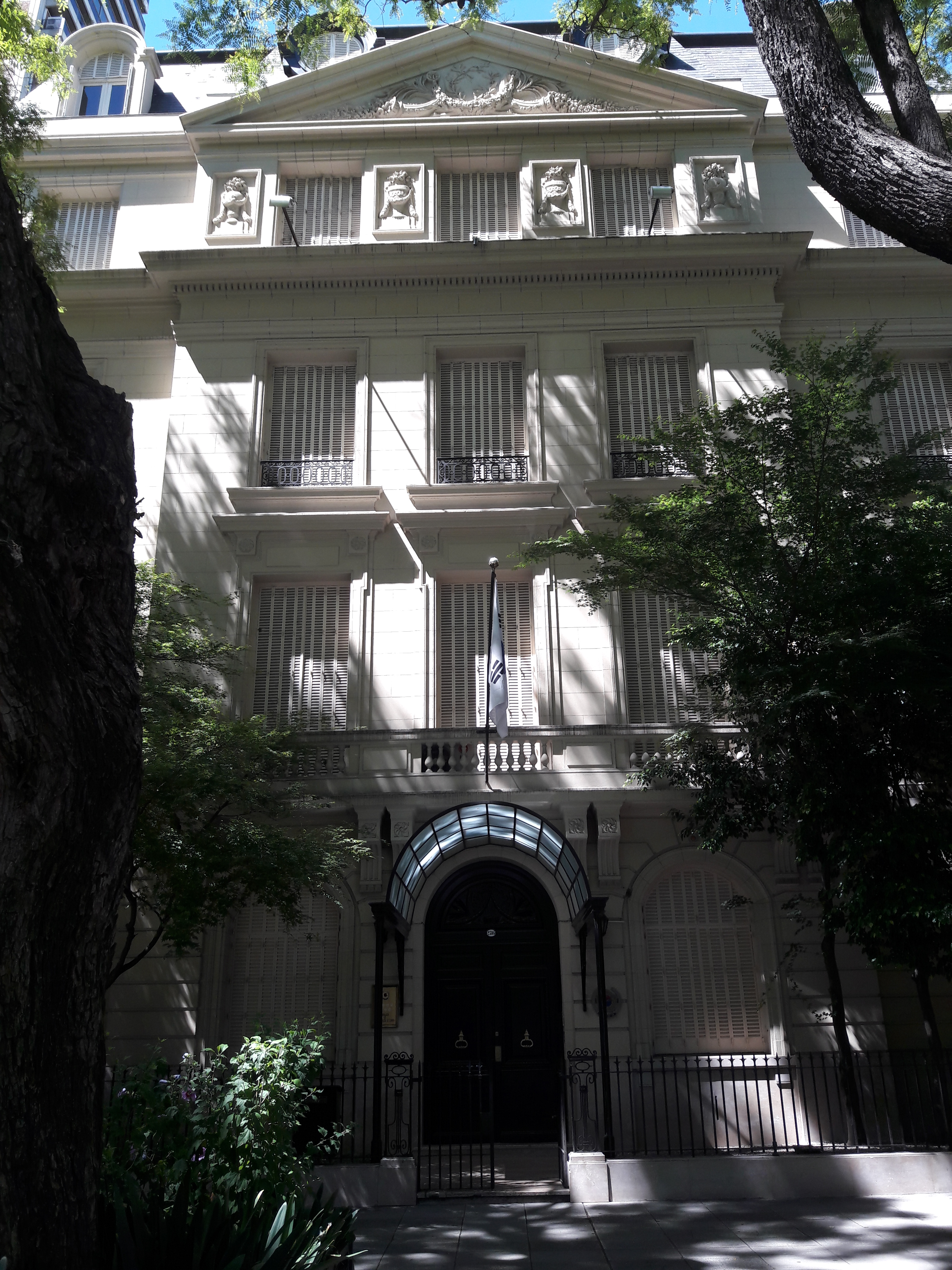
Embassy in Buenos Aires

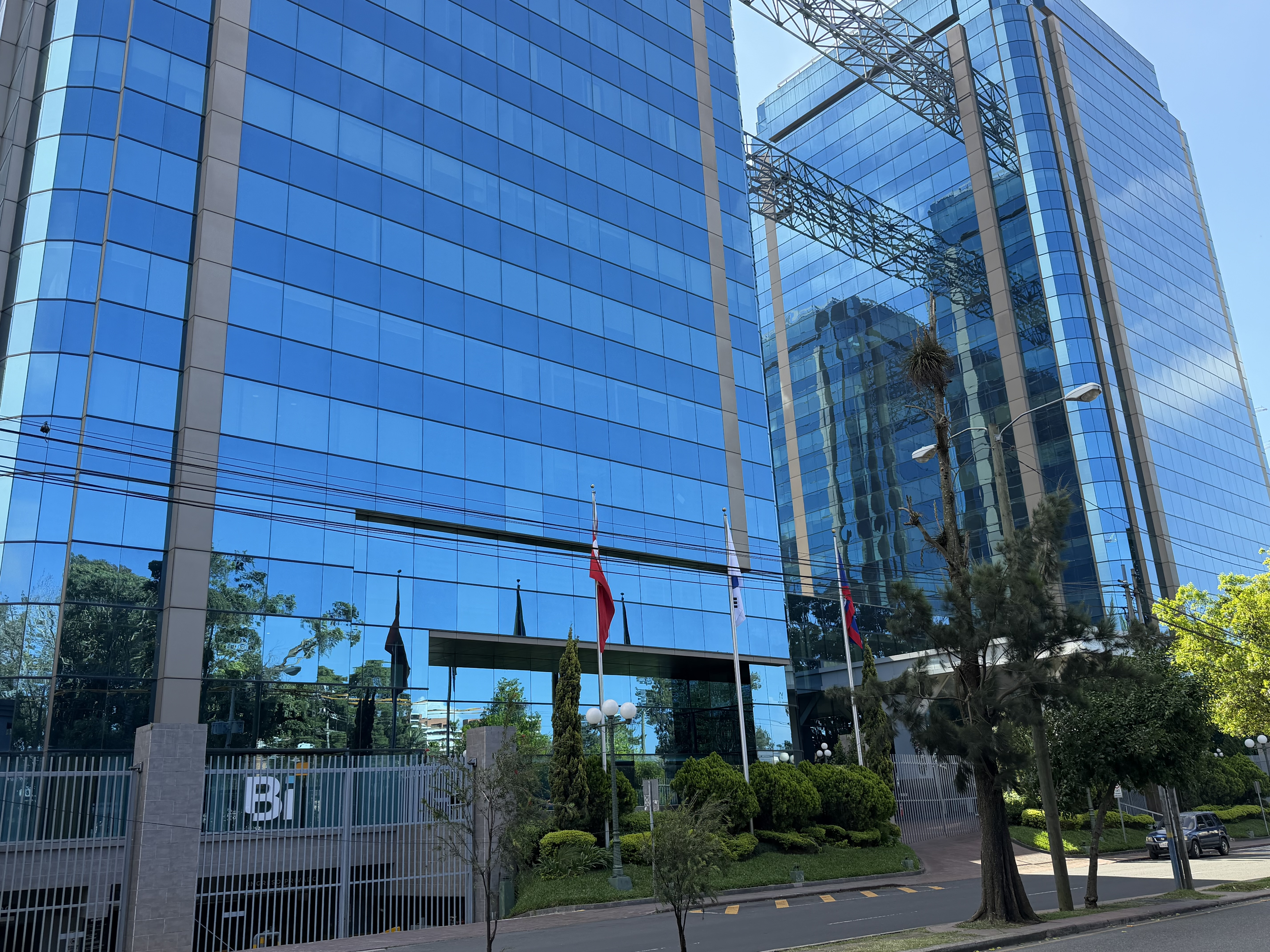
Building hosting the Embassy in Guatemala City

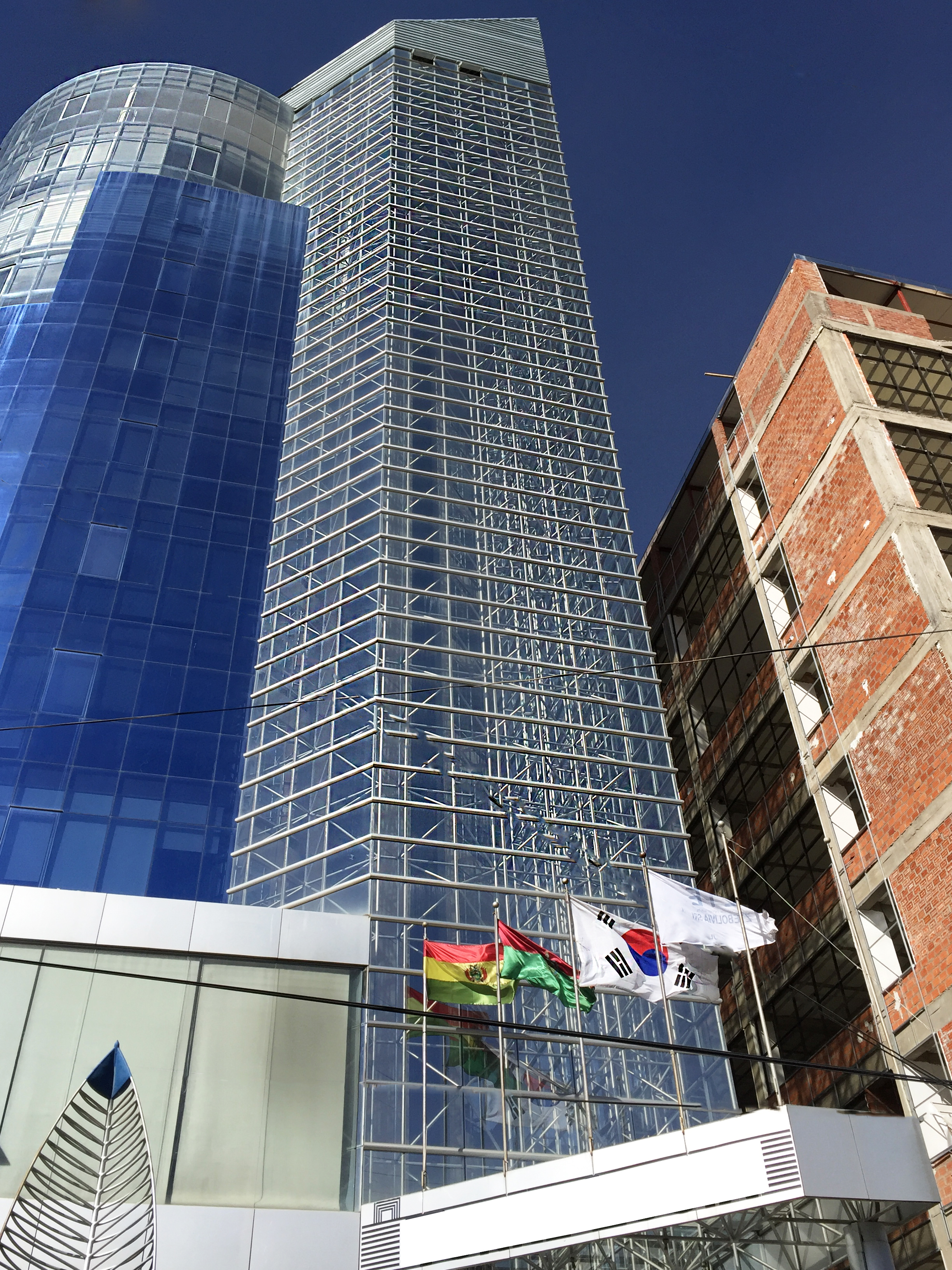
Building hosting the embassy in La Paz

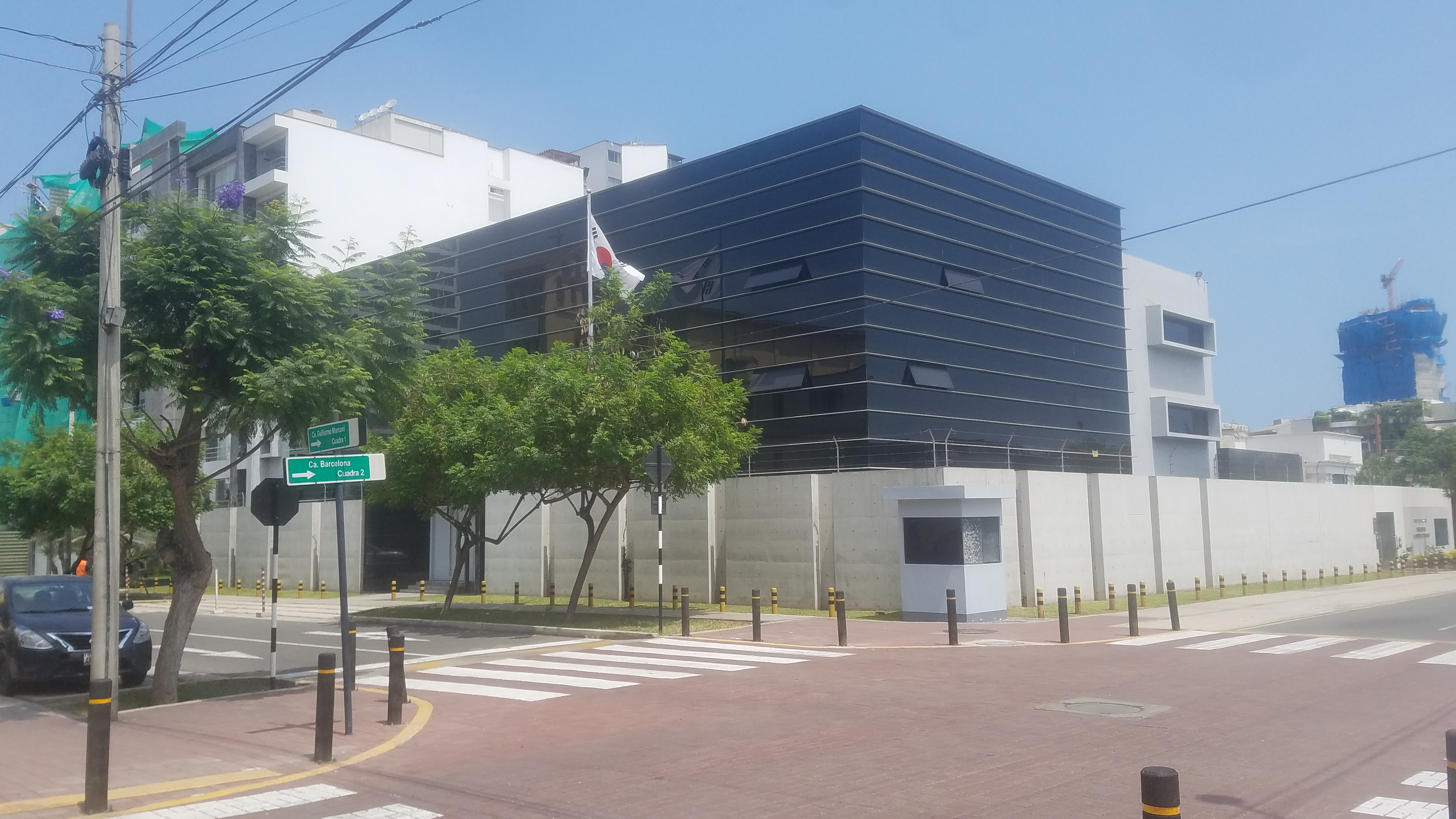
Embassy in Lima

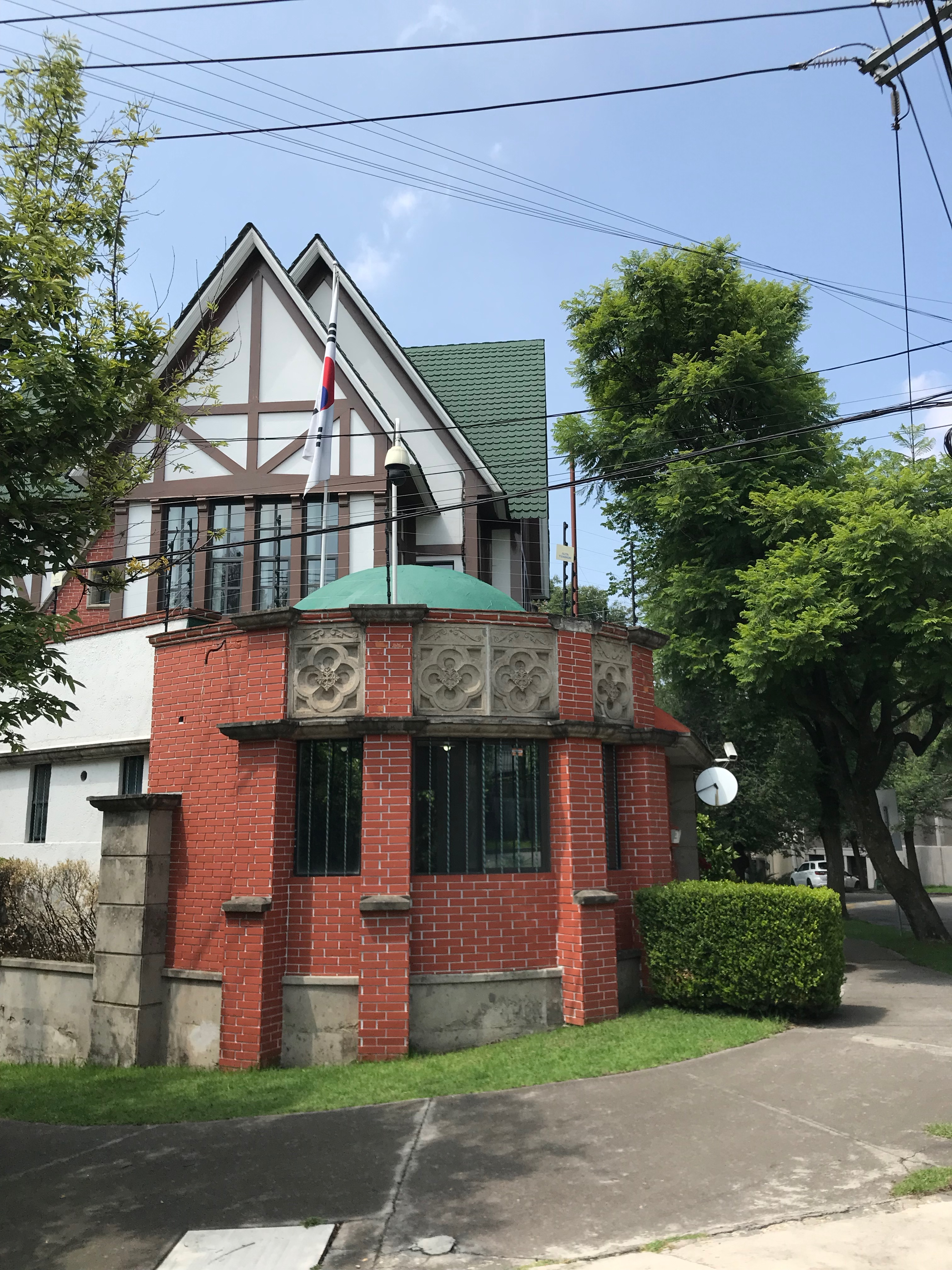
Embassy in Mexico City

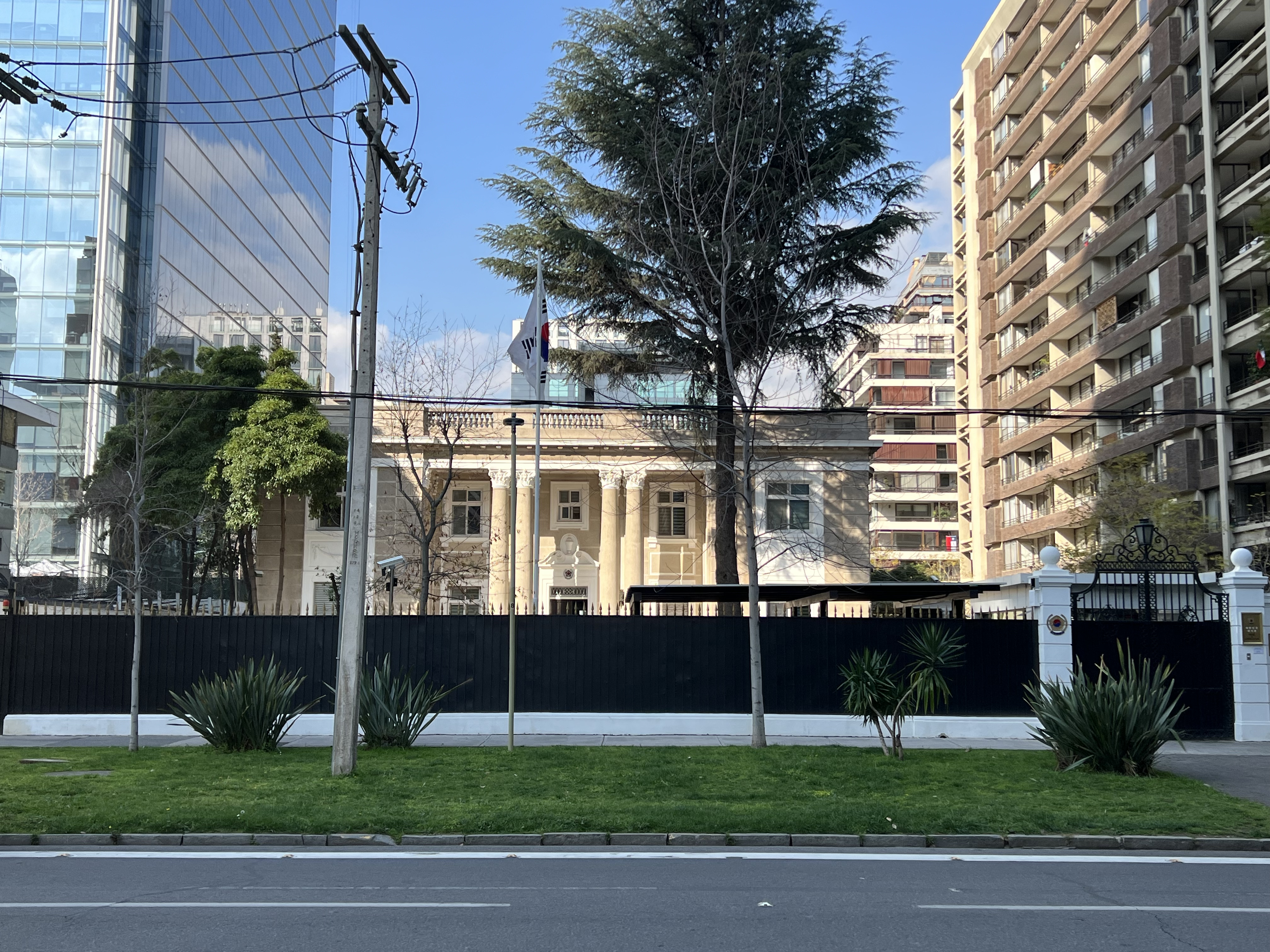
Embassy in Santiago de Chile

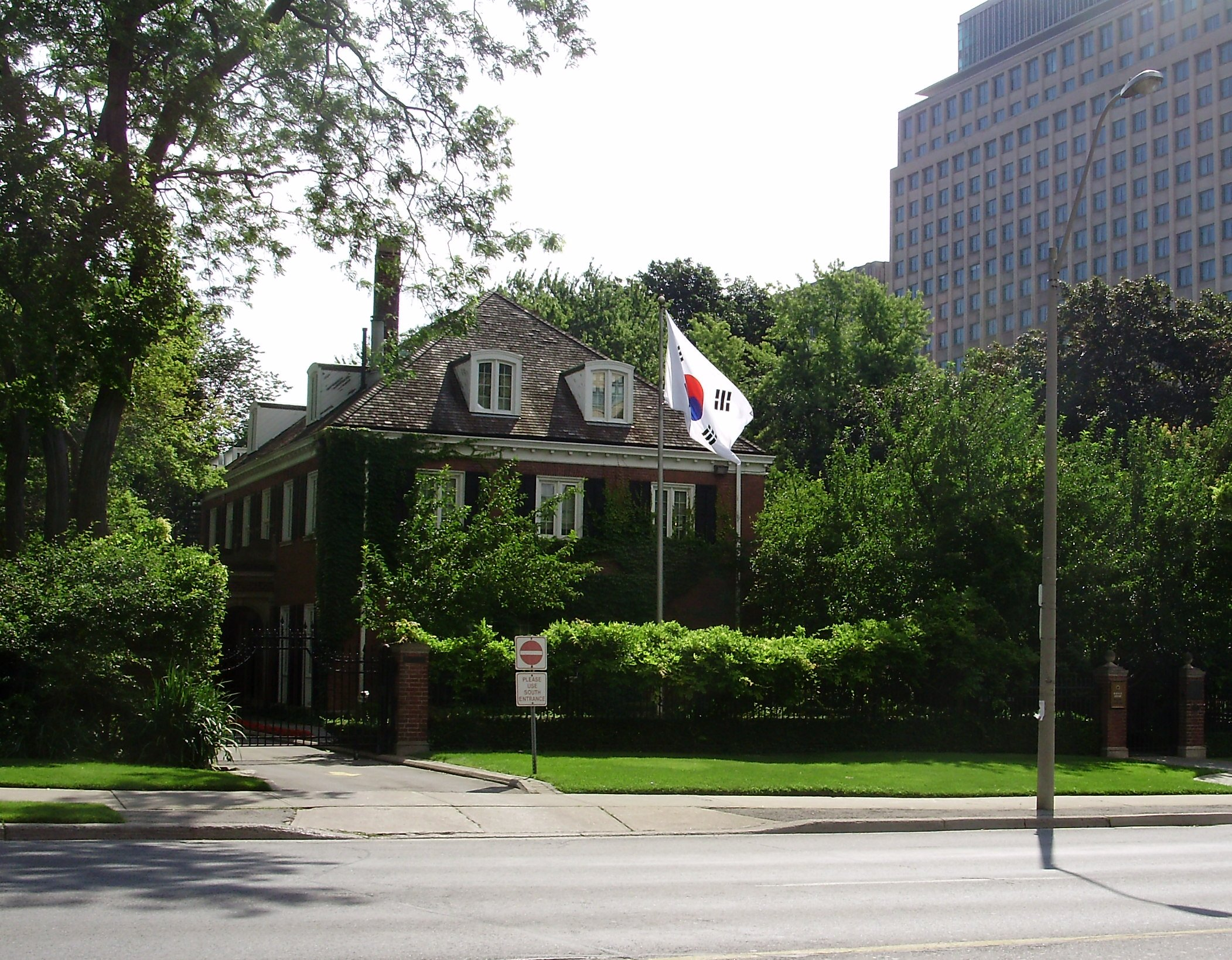
Consulate-General in Toronto

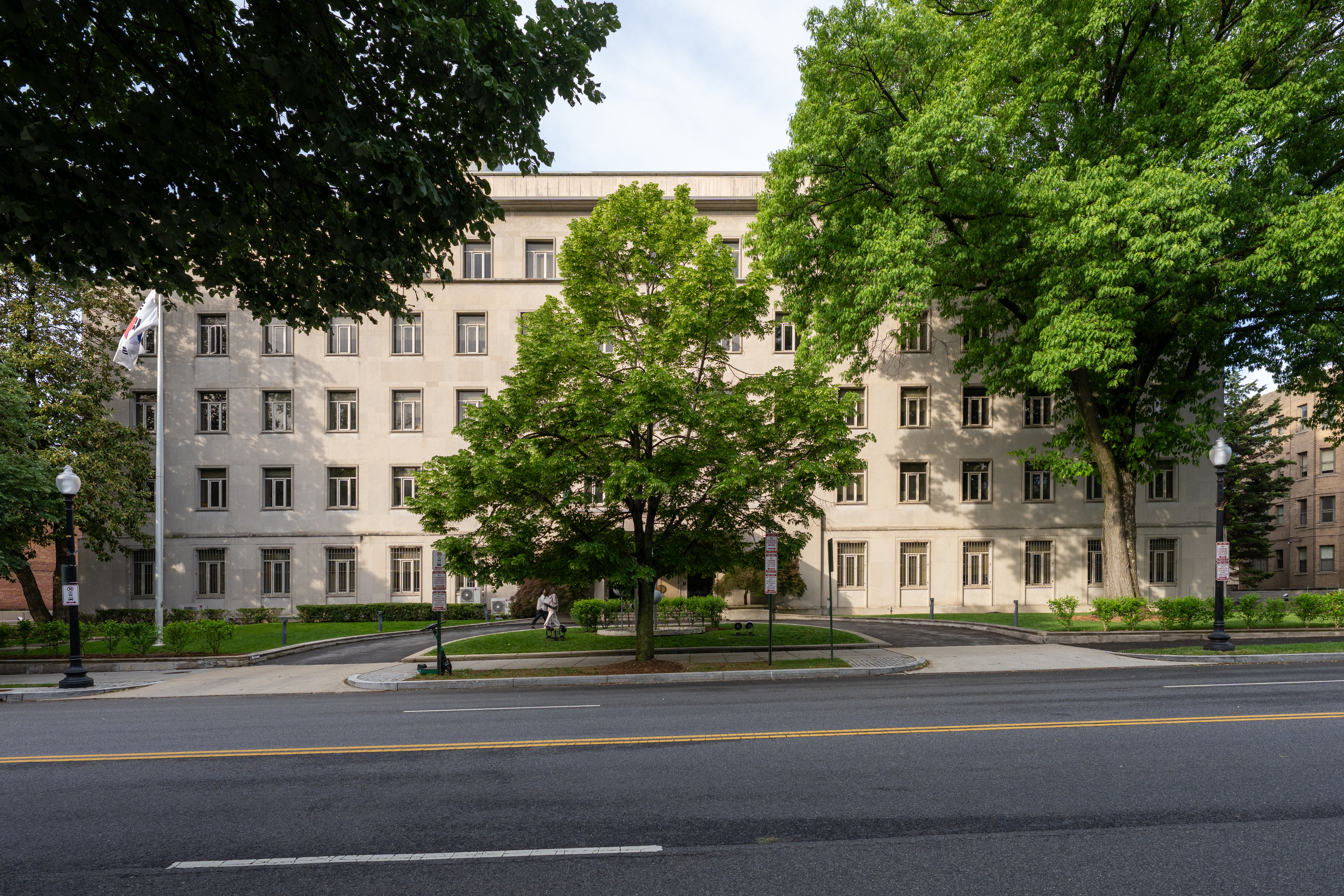
Embassy in Washington, D.C.

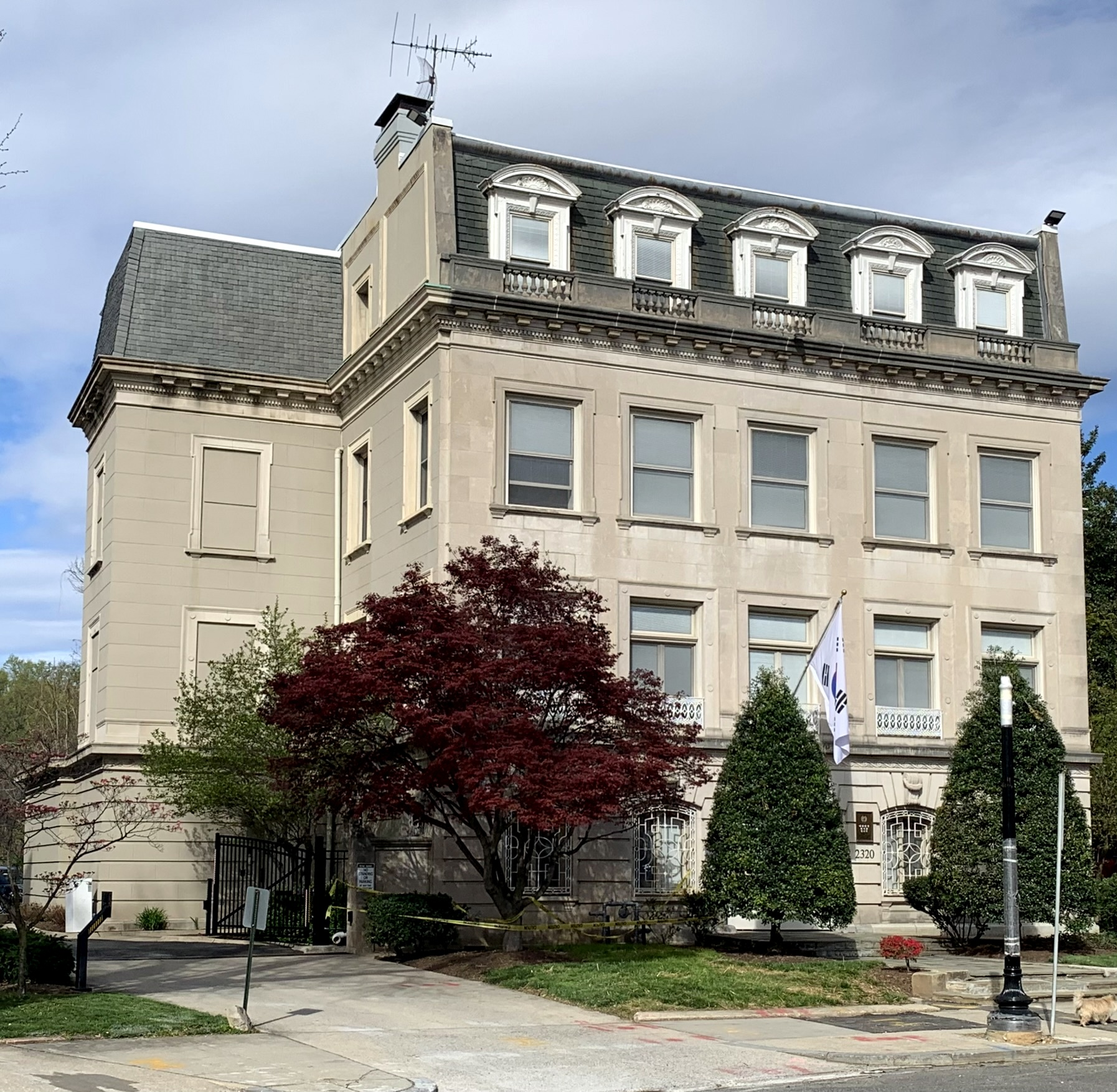
Consulate-General in Washington, D.C.

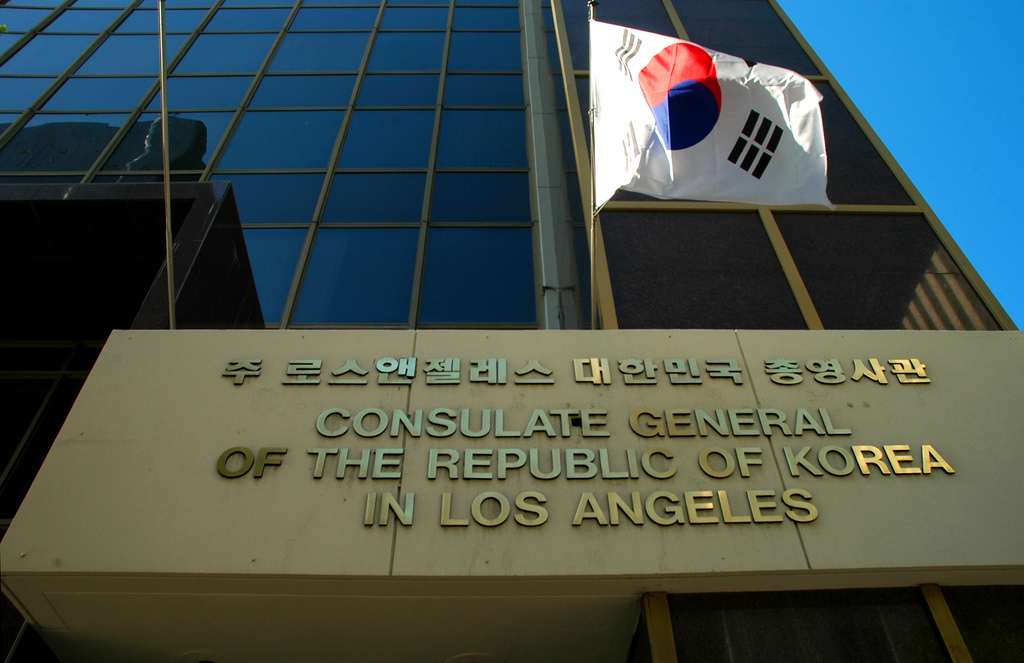
Consulate-General in Los Angeles

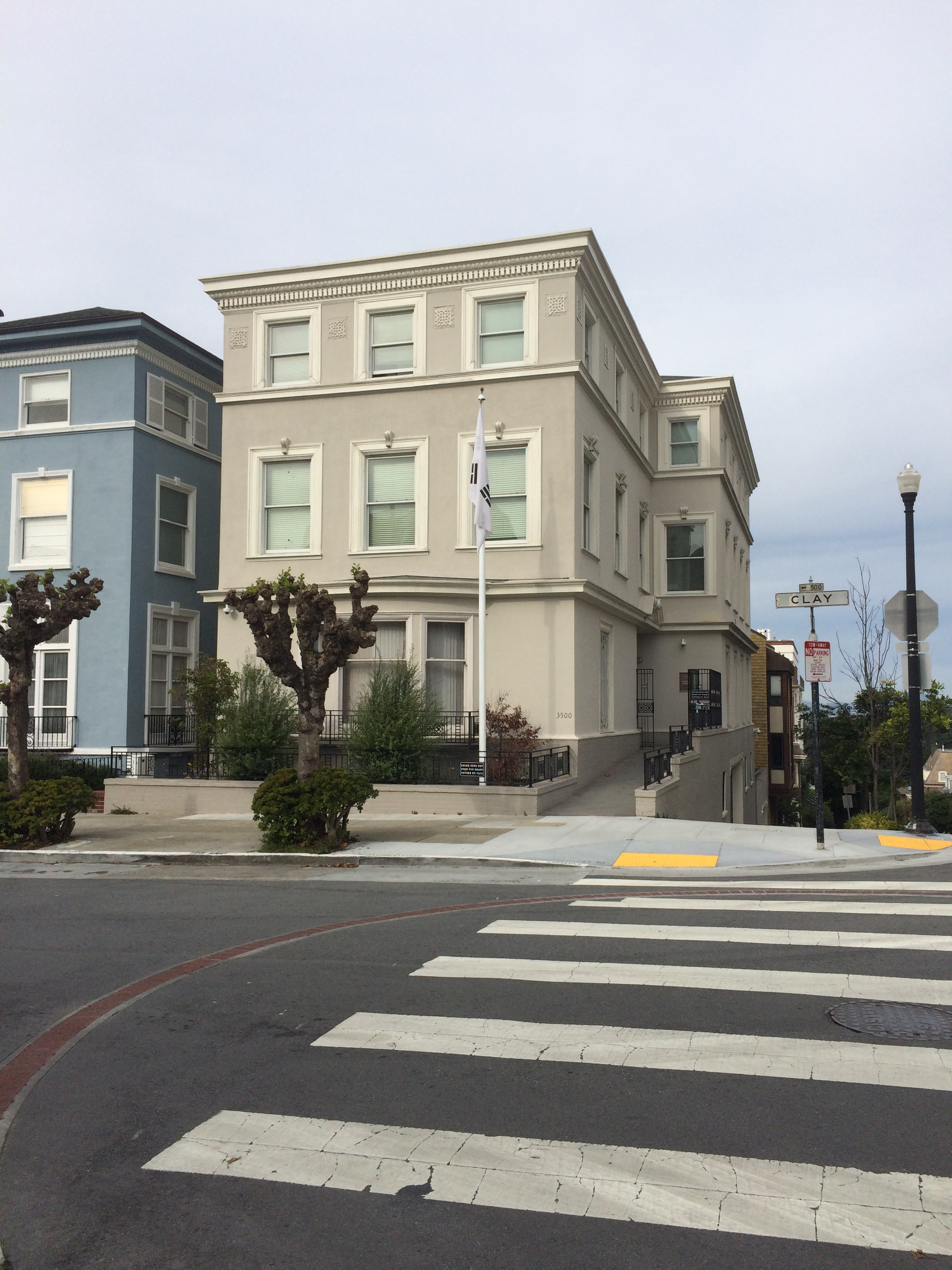
Consulate-General in San Francisco

=== Asia ===
Host country	Host city	Mission	Concurrent accreditation	Ref.
Azerbaijan	Baku	Embassy		
Bangladesh	Dhaka	Embassy	Countries: Bhutan	
Bahrain	Manama	Embassy		
Brunei	Bandar Seri Begawan	Embassy		
Cambodia	Phnom Penh	Embassy		
Cambodia	Siem Reap	Consulate		
China	Beijing	Embassy		
China	Chengdu	Consulate-General		
China	Guangzhou	Consulate-General		
China	Hong Kong	Consulate-General		
China	Qingdao	Consulate-General		
China	Shanghai	Consulate-General		
China	Shenyang	Consulate-General		
China	Wuhan	Consulate-General		
China	Xi'an	Consulate-General		
China	Dalian	Consulate-General branch office		
Georgia	Tbilisi	Embassy		
India	New Delhi	Embassy		
India	Chennai	Consulate-General		
India	Mumbai	Consulate-General		
Indonesia	Jakarta	Embassy		
Indonesia	Badung	Consulate		
Iran	Tehran	Embassy		
Iraq	Baghdad	Embassy		
Iraq	Erbil	Consulate		
Israel	Tel Aviv	Embassy		
Japan	Tokyo	Embassy		
Japan	Fukuoka	Consulate-General		
Japan	Hiroshima	Consulate-General		
Japan	Kobe	Consulate-General		
Japan	Nagoya	Consulate-General		
Japan	Niigata	Consulate-General		
Japan	Osaka	Consulate-General		
Japan	Sapporo	Consulate-General		
Japan	Sendai	Consulate-General		
Japan	Yokohama	Consulate-General		
Jordan	Amman	Embassy		
Kazakhstan	Astana	Embassy		
Kazakhstan	Almaty	Consulate-General		
Kuwait	Kuwait City	Embassy		
Kyrgyzstan	Bishkek	Embassy		
Laos	Vientiane	Embassy		
Lebanon	Beirut	Embassy	Countries: Syria	
Malaysia	Kuala Lumpur	Embassy		
Malaysia	Kota Kinabalu	Consulate		
Mongolia	Ulaanbaatar	Embassy		
Myanmar	Yangon	Embassy		
Nepal	Kathmandu	Embassy		
Oman	Muscat	Embassy		
Pakistan	Islamabad	Embassy		
Pakistan	Karachi	Embassy office		
Palestine	Ramallah	Representative office		
Philippines	Manila	Embassy	Countries: Palau	
Philippines	Cebu	Consulate	Countries: Palau	
Qatar	Doha	Embassy		
Saudi Arabia	Riyadh	Embassy		
Saudi Arabia	Jeddah	Consulate-General		
Singapore	Singapore	Embassy		
Sri Lanka	Colombo	Embassy	Countries: Maldives	
Republic of China (Taiwan)	Taipei	Mission		
Tajikistan	Dushanbe	Embassy		
Thailand	Bangkok	Embassy		
Timor-Leste	Dili	Embassy		
Turkey	Ankara	Embassy		
Turkey	Istanbul	Consulate-General		
Turkmenistan	Ashgabat	Embassy		
United Arab Emirates	Abu Dhabi	Embassy		
United Arab Emirates	Dubai	Consulate-General		
Uzbekistan	Tashkent	Embassy		
Vietnam	Hanoi	Embassy		
Vietnam	Da Nang	Consulate-General		
Vietnam	Ho Chi Minh City	Consulate-General		

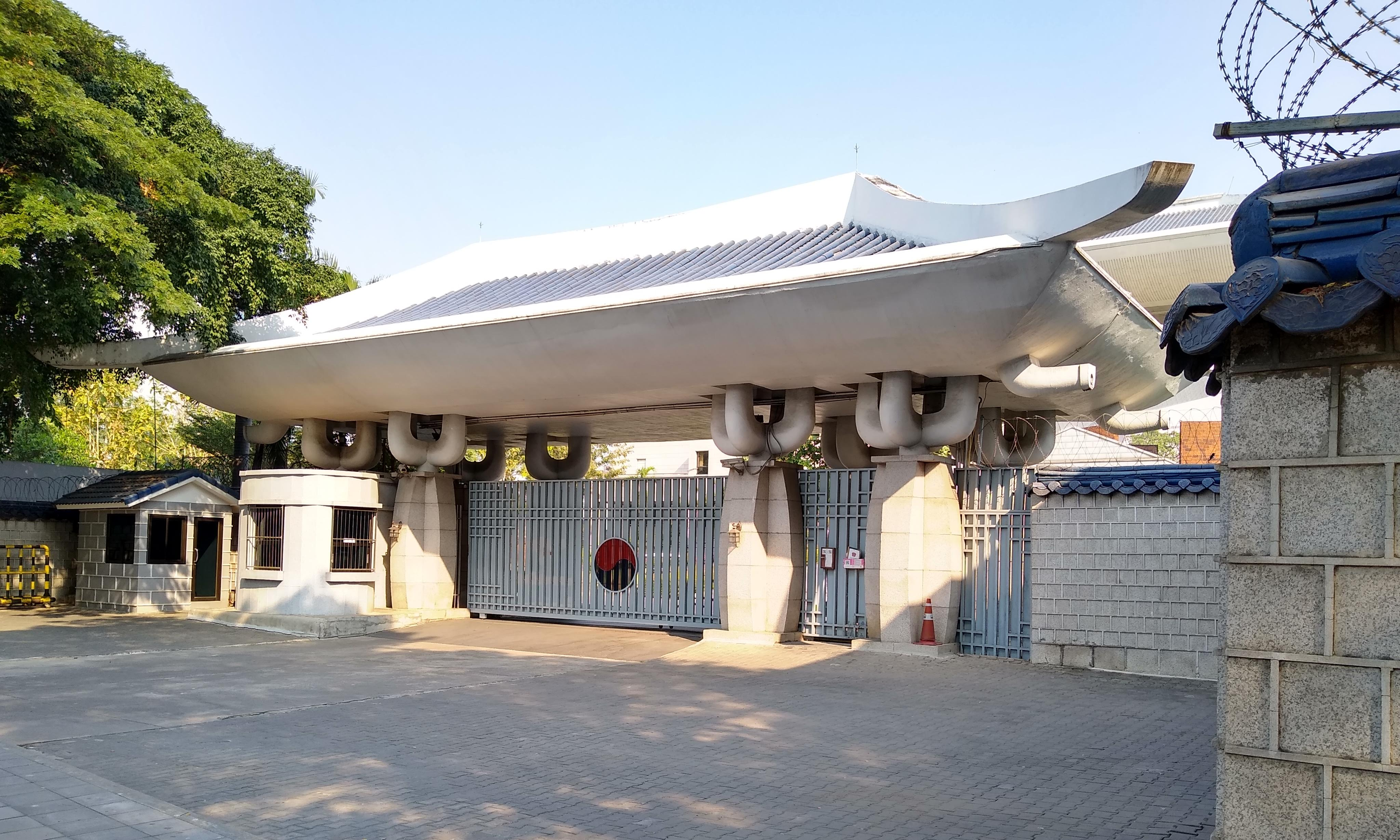
Embassy in Bangkok

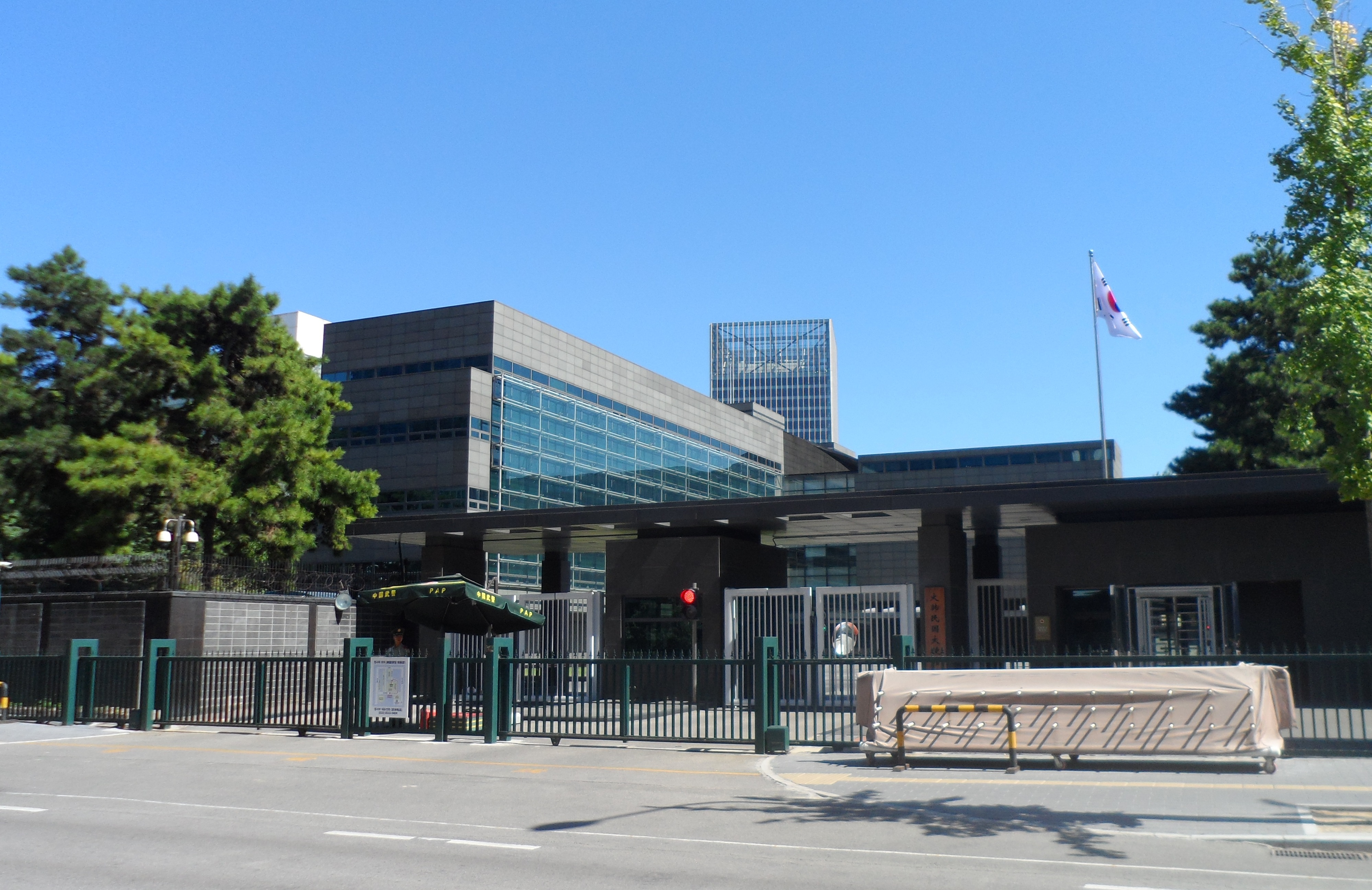
Embassy in Beijing

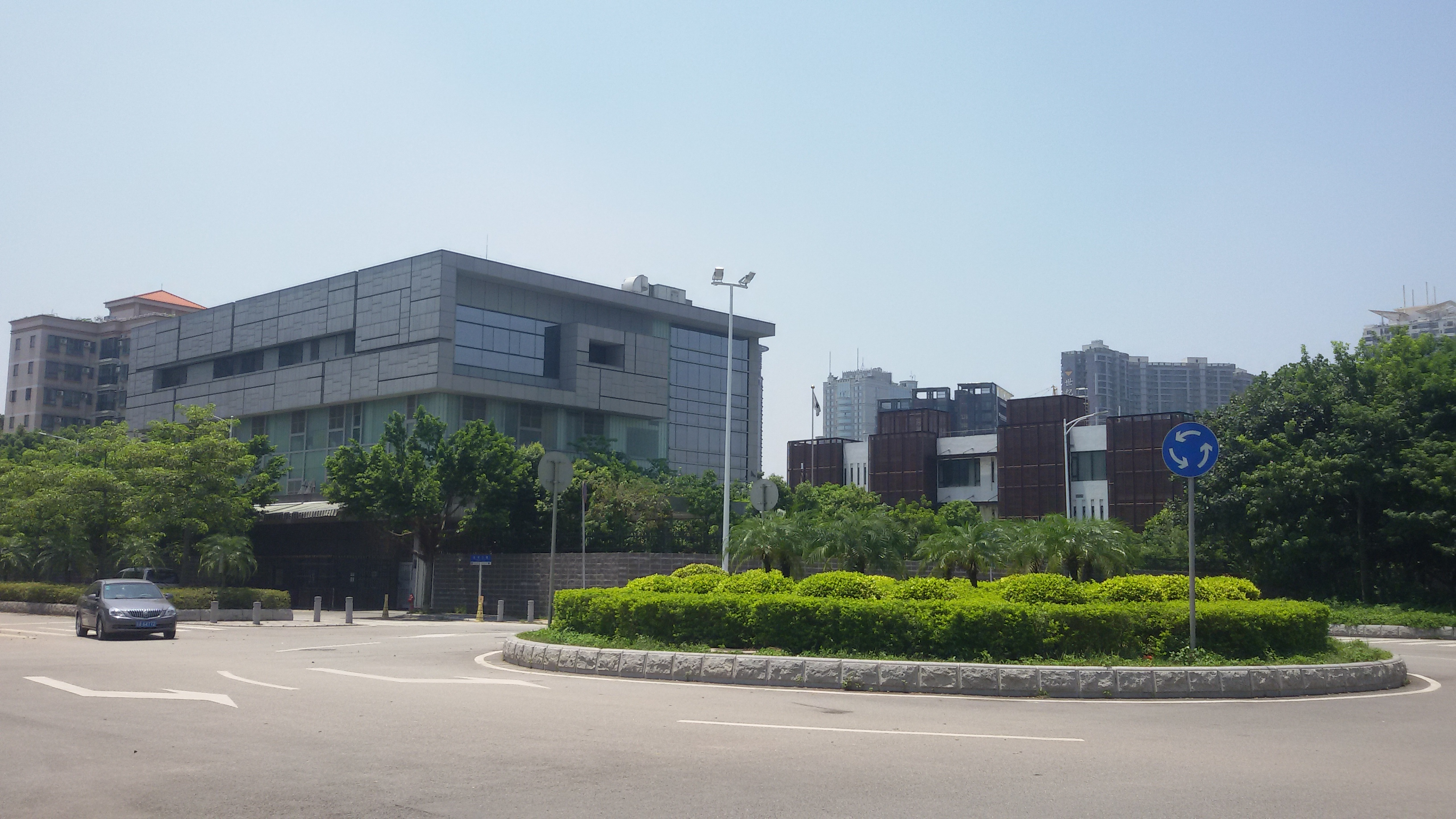
Consulate-General in Guangzhou

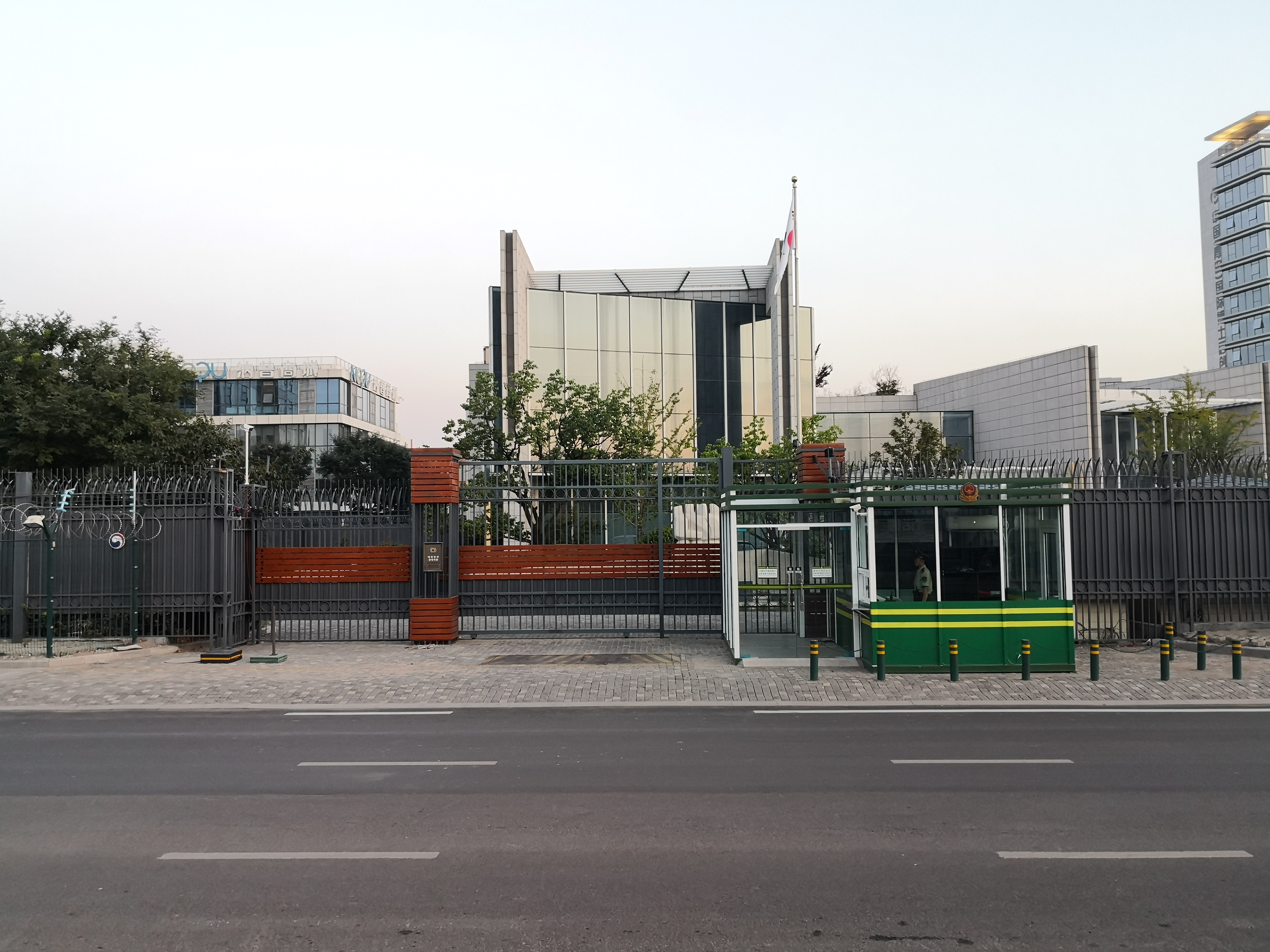
Consulate-General in Qingdao

Embassy in Jakarta

Embassy in Manila

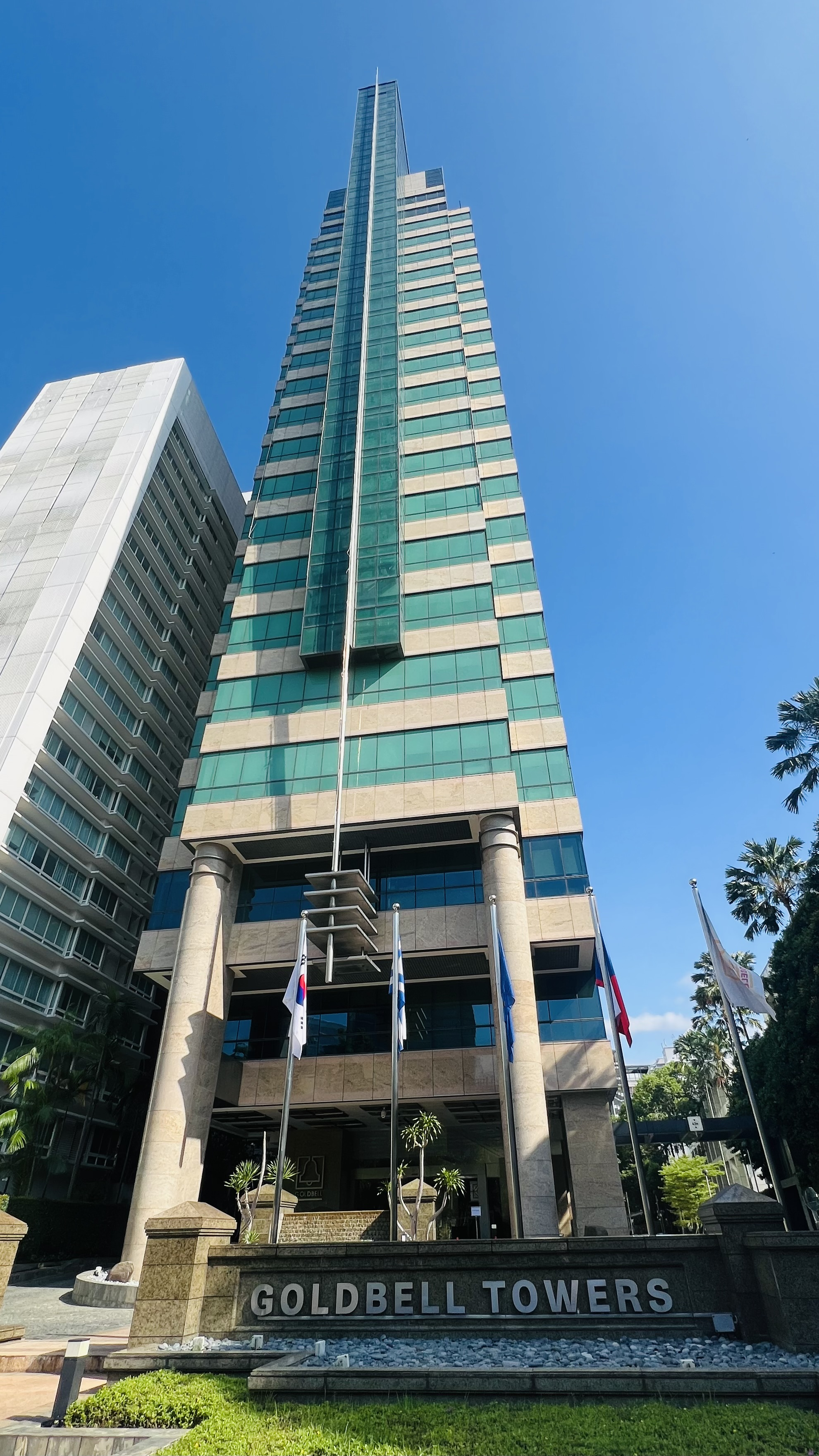
Building hosting the Embassy in Singapore

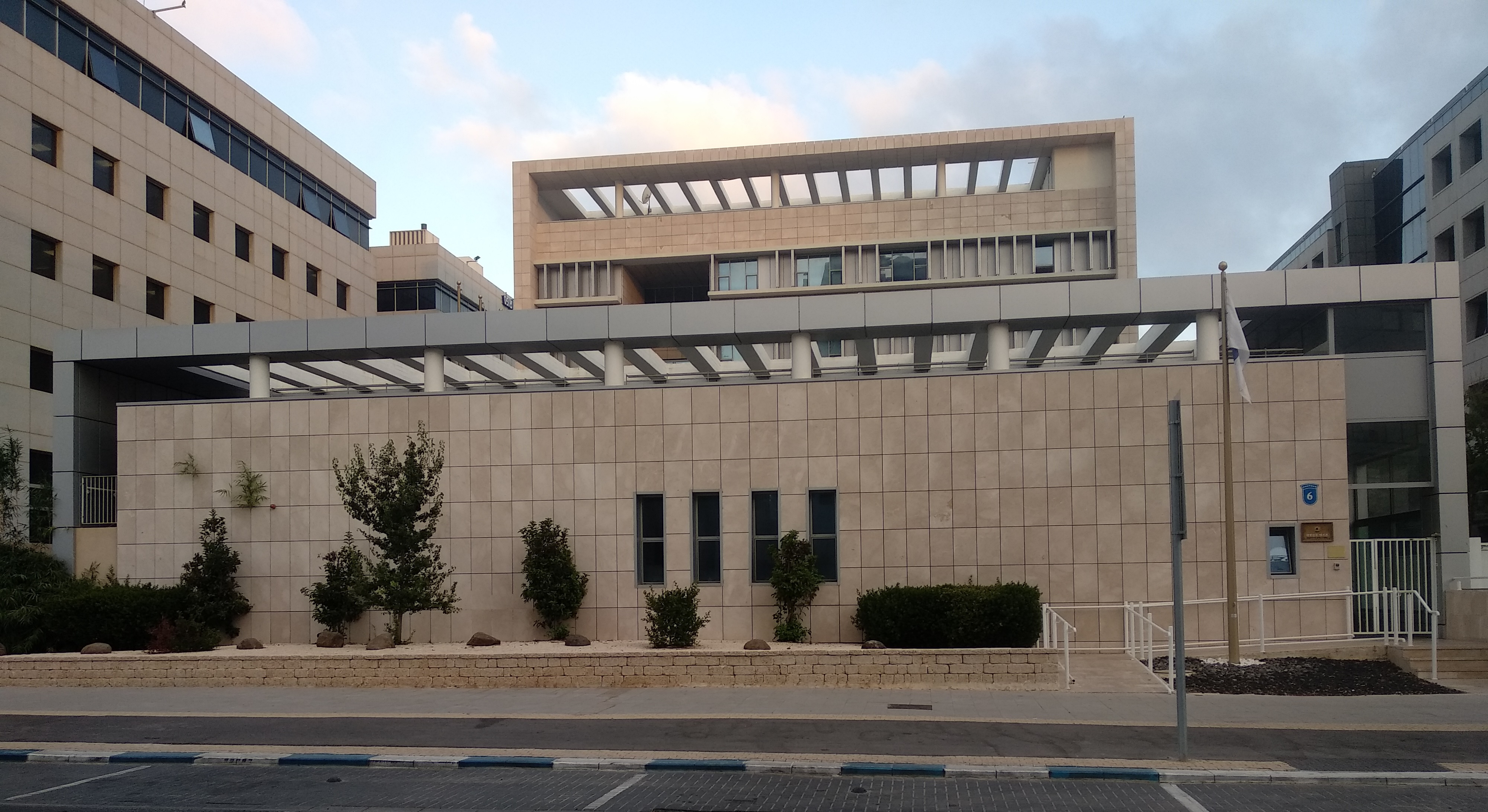
Embassy in Tel Aviv

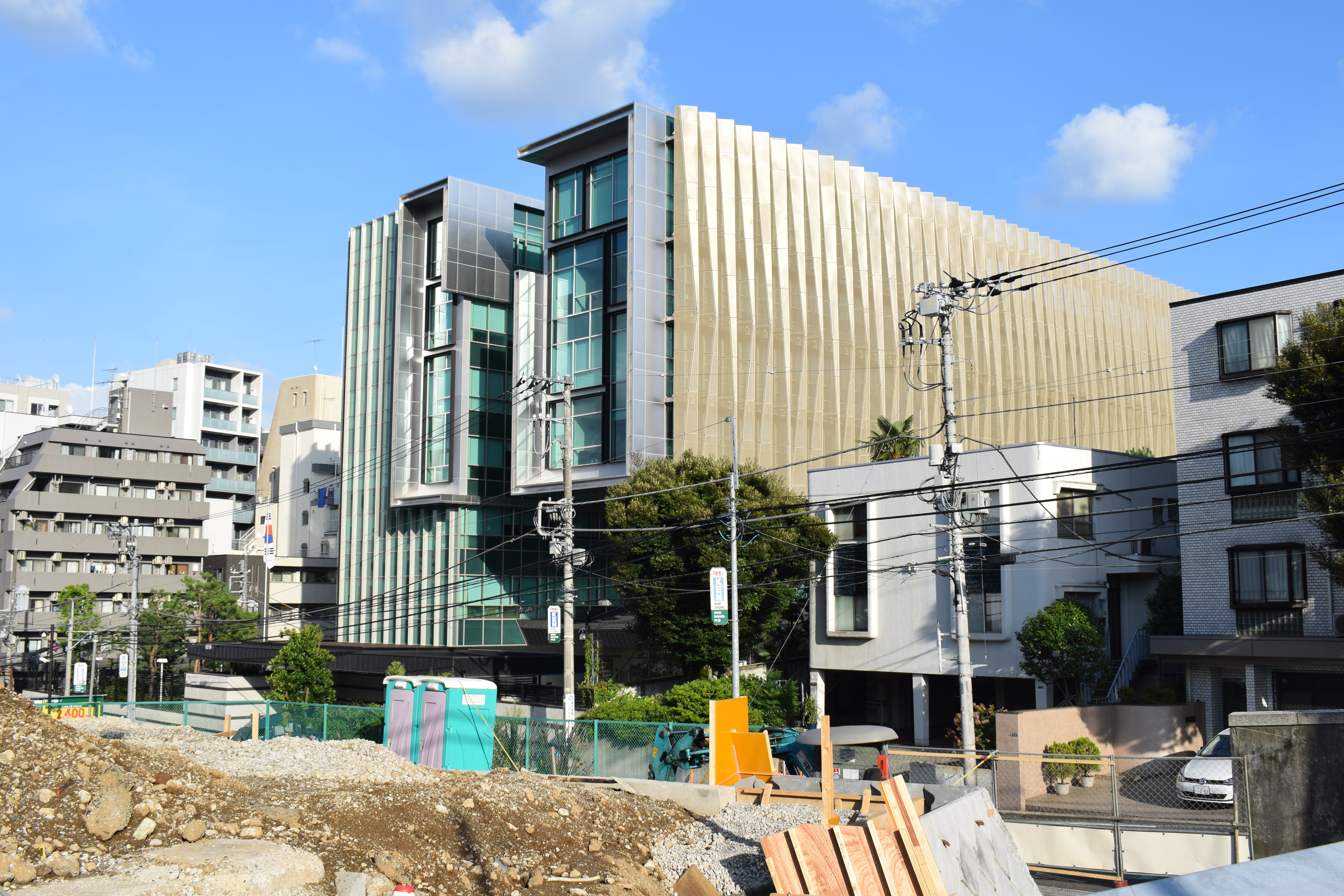
Embassy in Tokyo

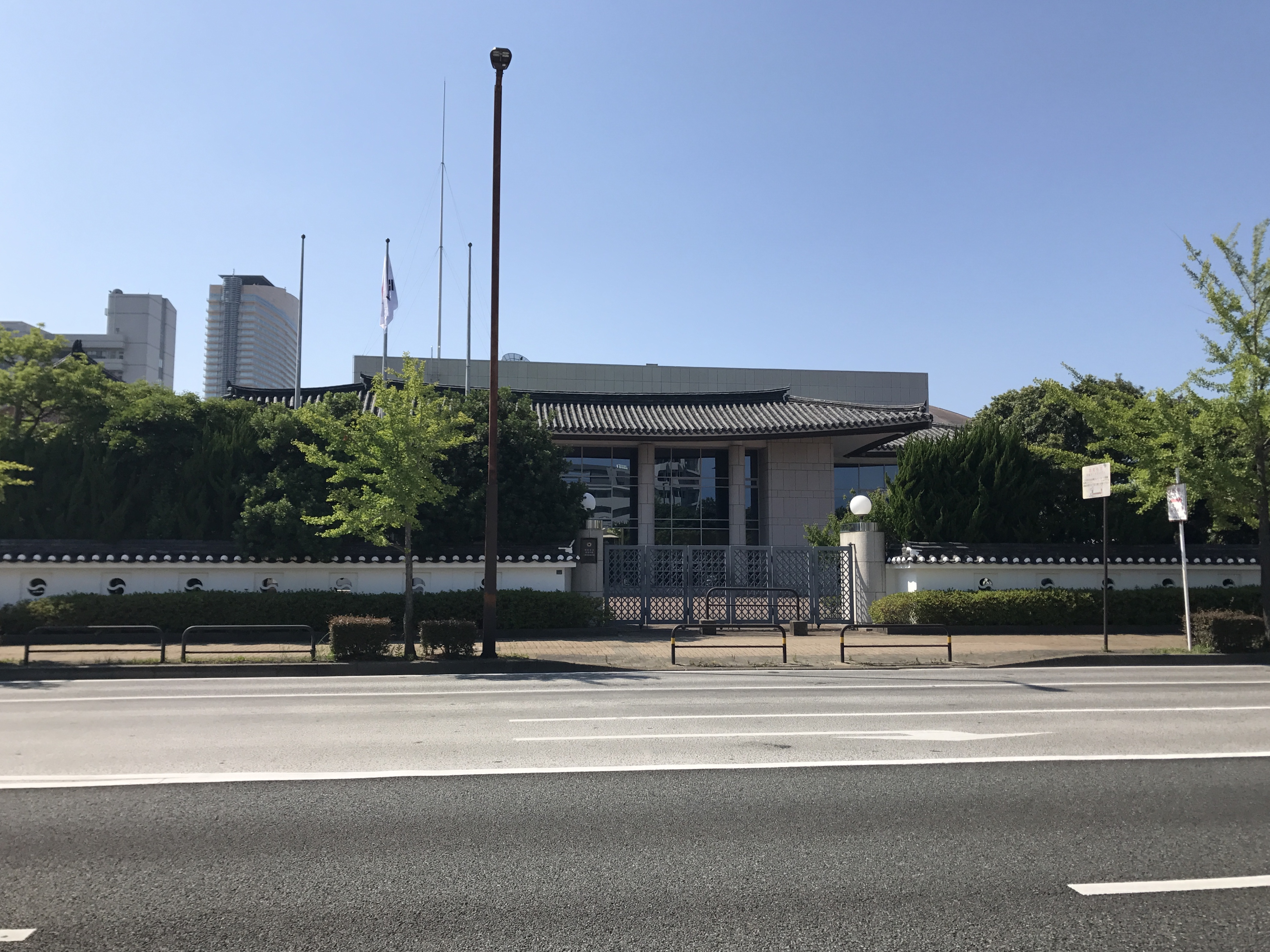
Consulate-General in Fukuoka

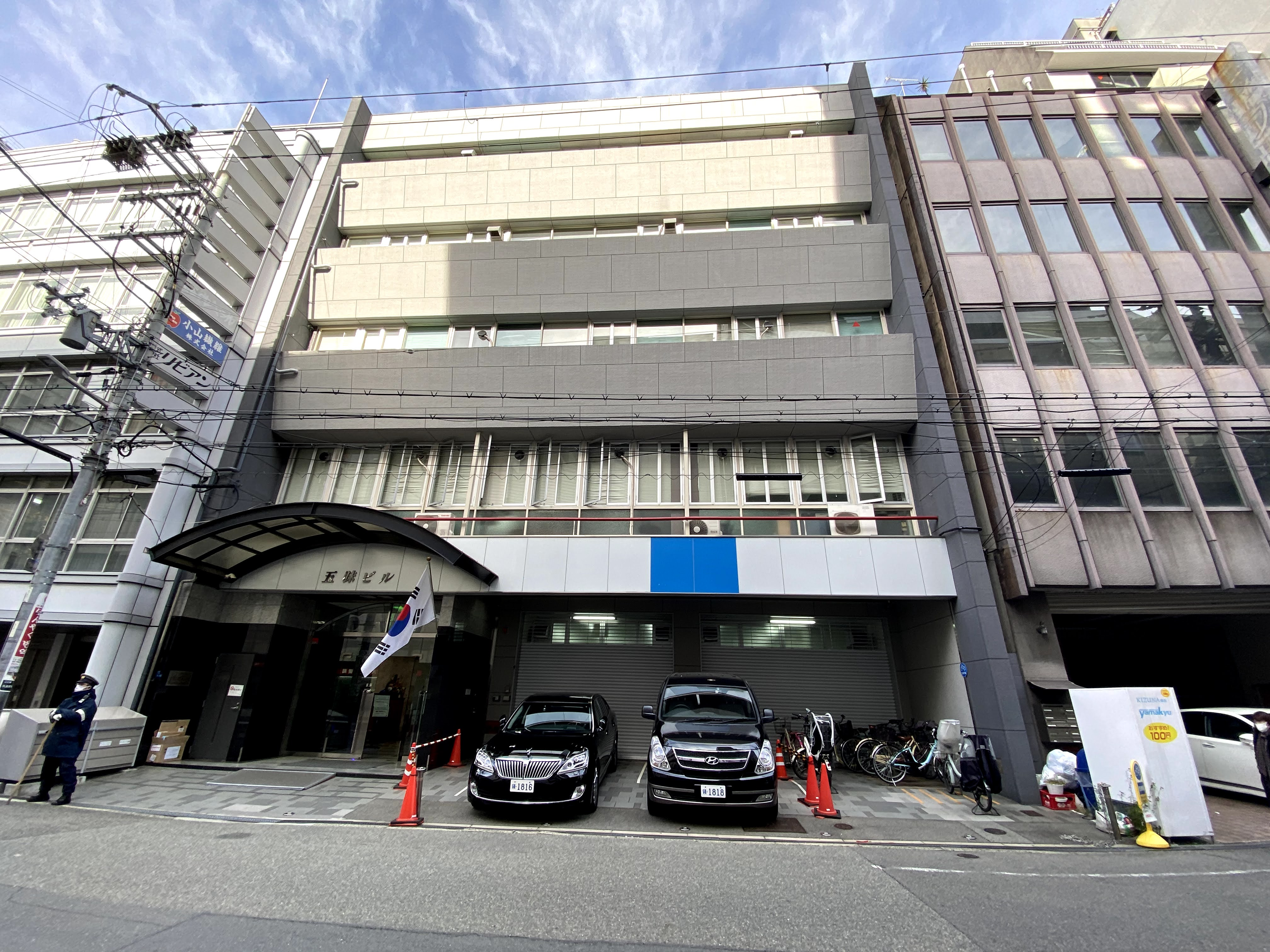
Consulate-General in Osaka

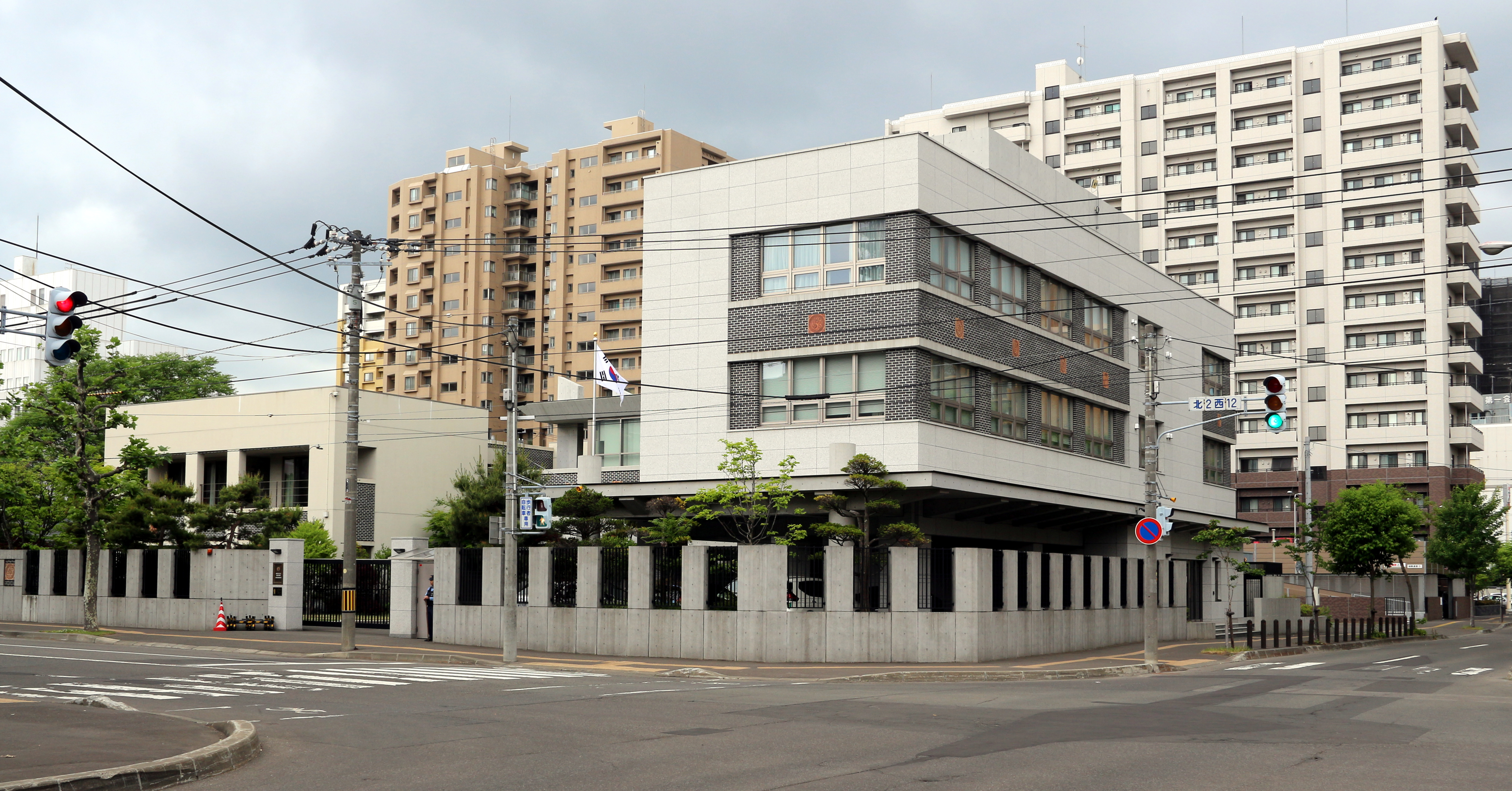
Consulate-General in Sapporo

=== Europe ===
Host country	Host city	Mission	Concurrent accreditation	Ref.
Austria	Vienna	Embassy	International Organizations: CTBTO Preparatory Commission; International Atomic Energy Agency; United Nations; United Nations Industrial Development Organization; United Nations Office on Drugs and Crime	
Belarus	Minsk	Embassy		
Belgium	Brussels	Embassy	International Organizations: European Union; NATO	
Bulgaria	Sofia	Embassy	Countries: North Macedonia	
Croatia	Zagreb	Embassy	Countries: Bosnia and Herzegovina	
Czechia	Prague	Embassy		
Denmark	Copenhagen	Embassy		
Estonia	Tallinn	Embassy		
Finland	Helsinki	Embassy		
France	Paris	Embassy	Countries: Monaco	
Germany	Berlin	Embassy		
Germany	Bonn	Embassy office		
Germany	Frankfurt	Consulate-General		
Germany	Hamburg	Consulate-General		
Greece	Athens	Embassy	Countries: Albania; Cyprus	
Holy See (Note: The South Korean Embassy to the Holy See is located outside Vatican territory in Rome.)	Rome	Embassy		
Hungary	Budapest	Embassy		
Ireland	Dublin	Embassy		
Italy	Rome	Embassy	Countries: Malta; San Marino	
Italy	Milan	Consulate-General	Countries: Malta; San Marino	
Latvia	Riga	Embassy		
Lithuania	Vilnius	Embassy		
Luxembourg	Luxembourg City	Embassy		
Netherlands	The Hague	Embassy	International Organizations: International Criminal Court; International Court of Justice; OCPW	
Norway	Oslo	Embassy	Countries: Iceland	
Poland	Warsaw	Embassy		
Portugal	Lisbon	Embassy		
Romania	Bucharest	Embassy		
Russia	Moscow	Embassy	Countries: Armenia	
Russia	Irkutsk	Consulate-General	Countries: Armenia	
Russia	Saint Petersburg	Consulate-General	Countries: Armenia	
Russia	Vladivostok	Consulate-General	Countries: Armenia	
Russia	Yuzhno-Sakhalinsk	Consular office	Countries: Armenia	
Serbia	Belgrade	Embassy	Countries: Montenegro	
Slovakia	Bratislava	Embassy		
Slovenia	Ljubljana	Embassy		
Spain	Madrid	Embassy	Countries: Andorra	
Spain	Barcelona	Consulate-General	Countries: Andorra	
Spain	Las Palmas de Gran Canaria	Consulate	Countries: Andorra	
Sweden	Stockholm	Embassy		
Switzerland	Bern	Embassy	Countries: Liechtenstein	
Ukraine	Kyiv	Embassy	Countries: Moldova	
United Kingdom	London	Embassy	International Organizations: International Maritime Organization	

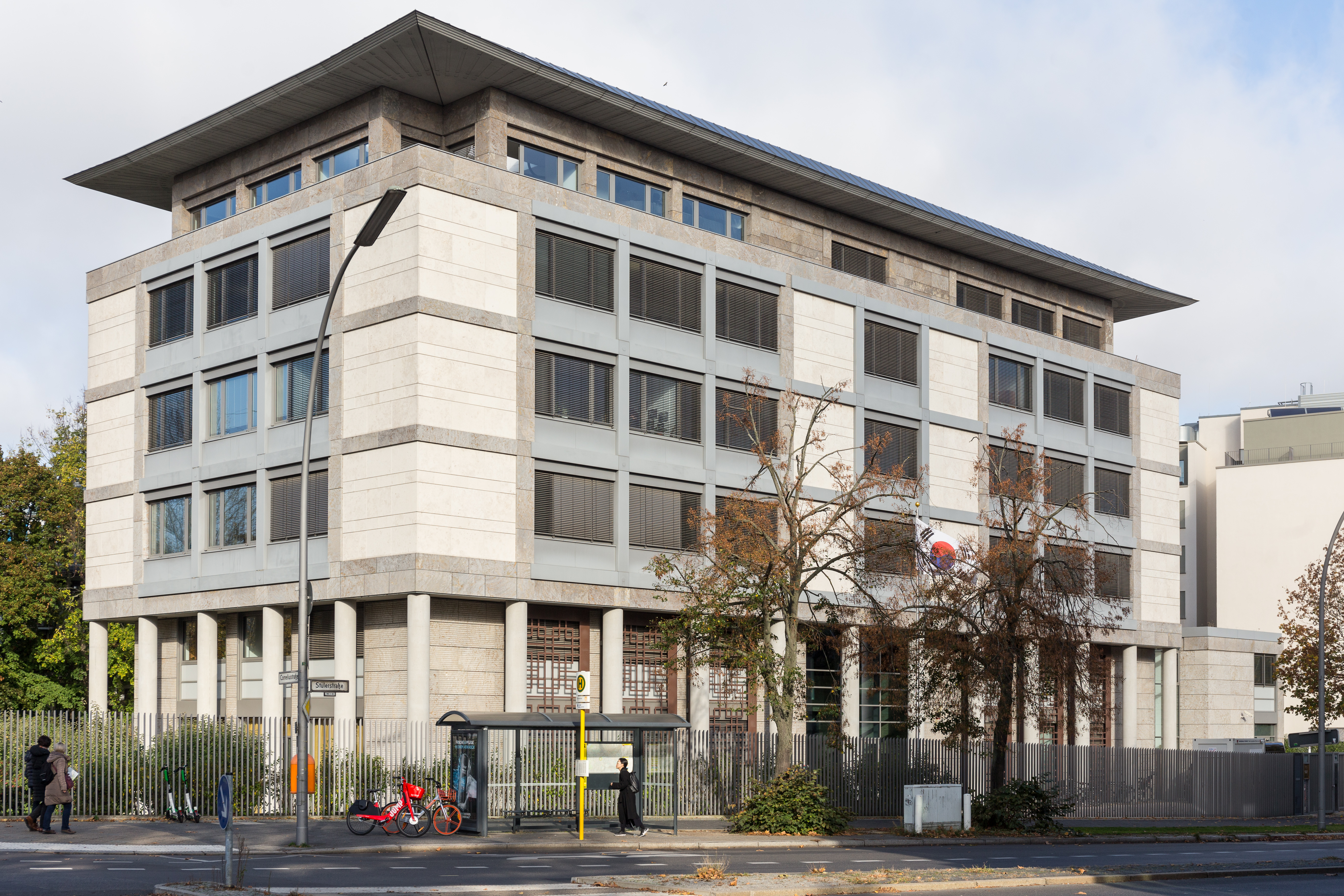
Embassy in Berlin

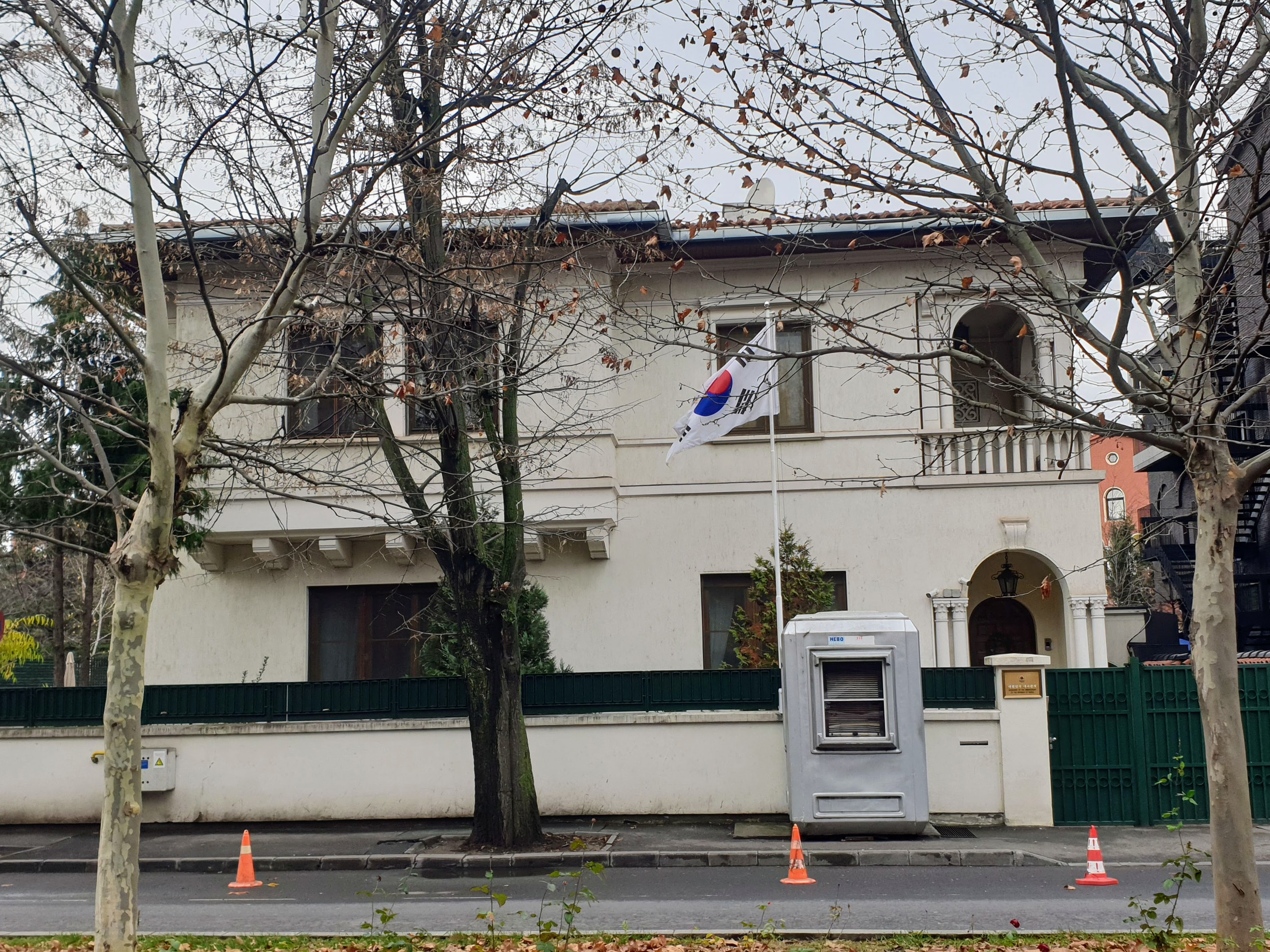
Embassy in Bucharest

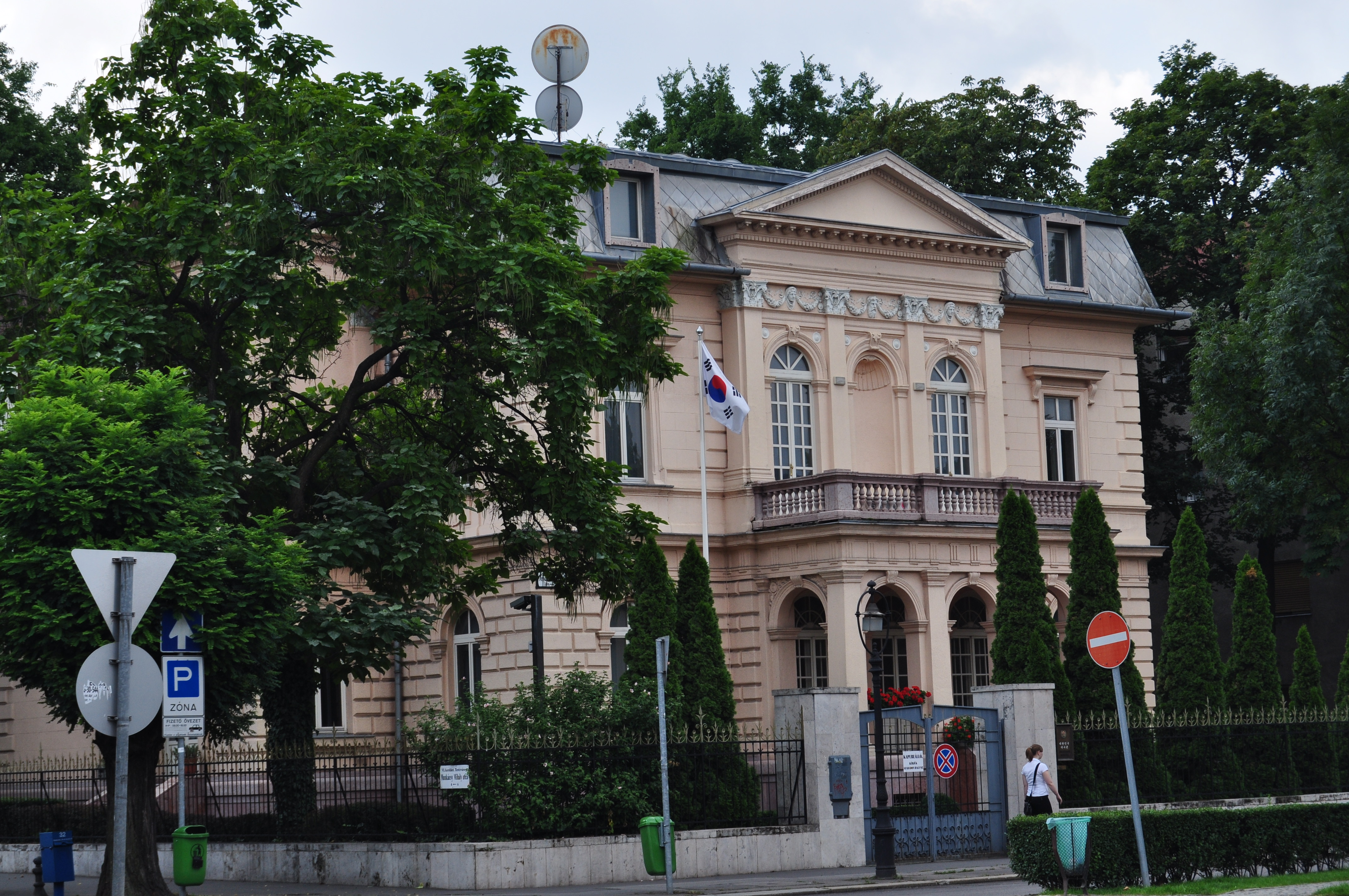
Embassy in Budapest

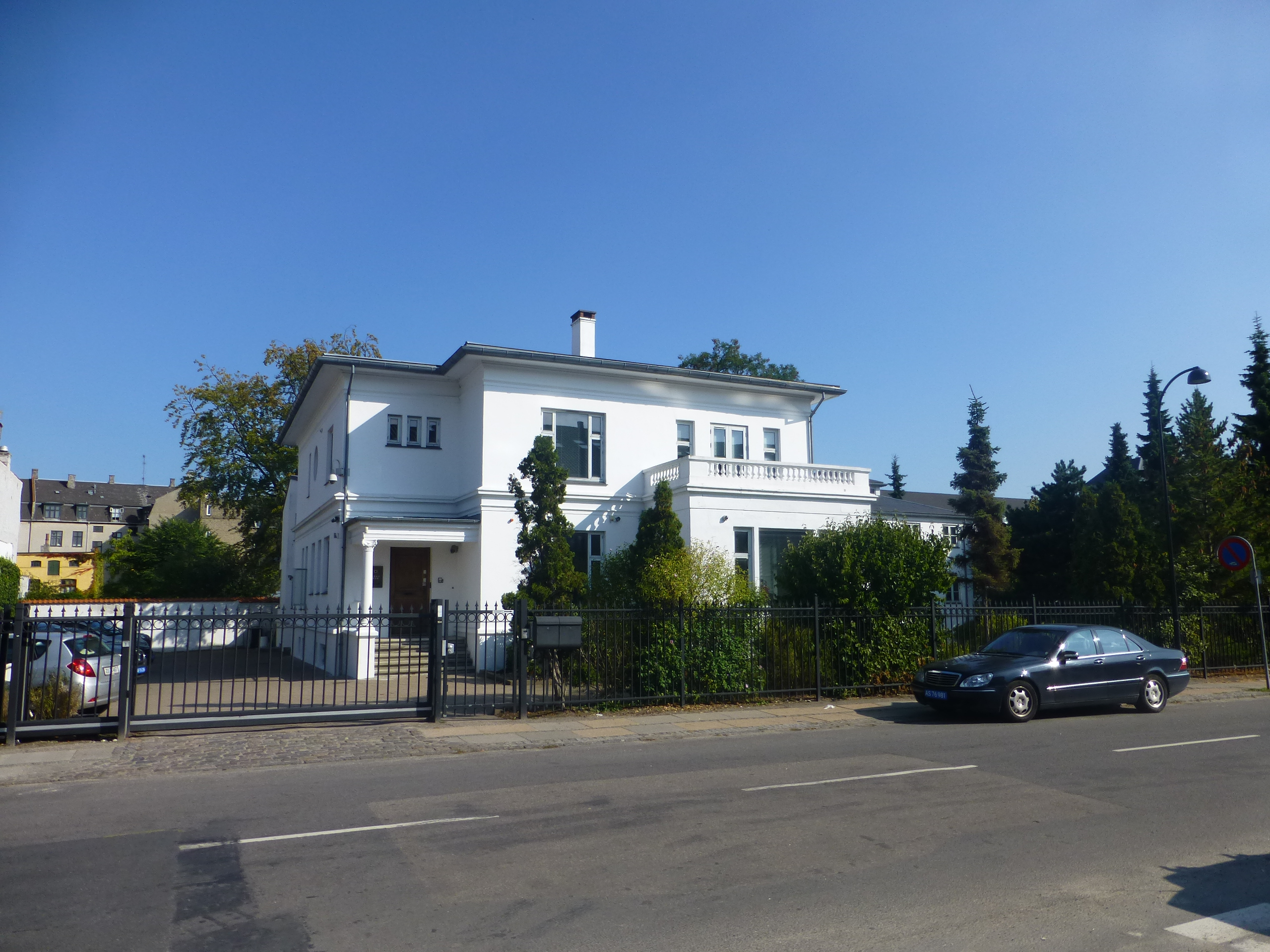
Embassy in Copenhagen

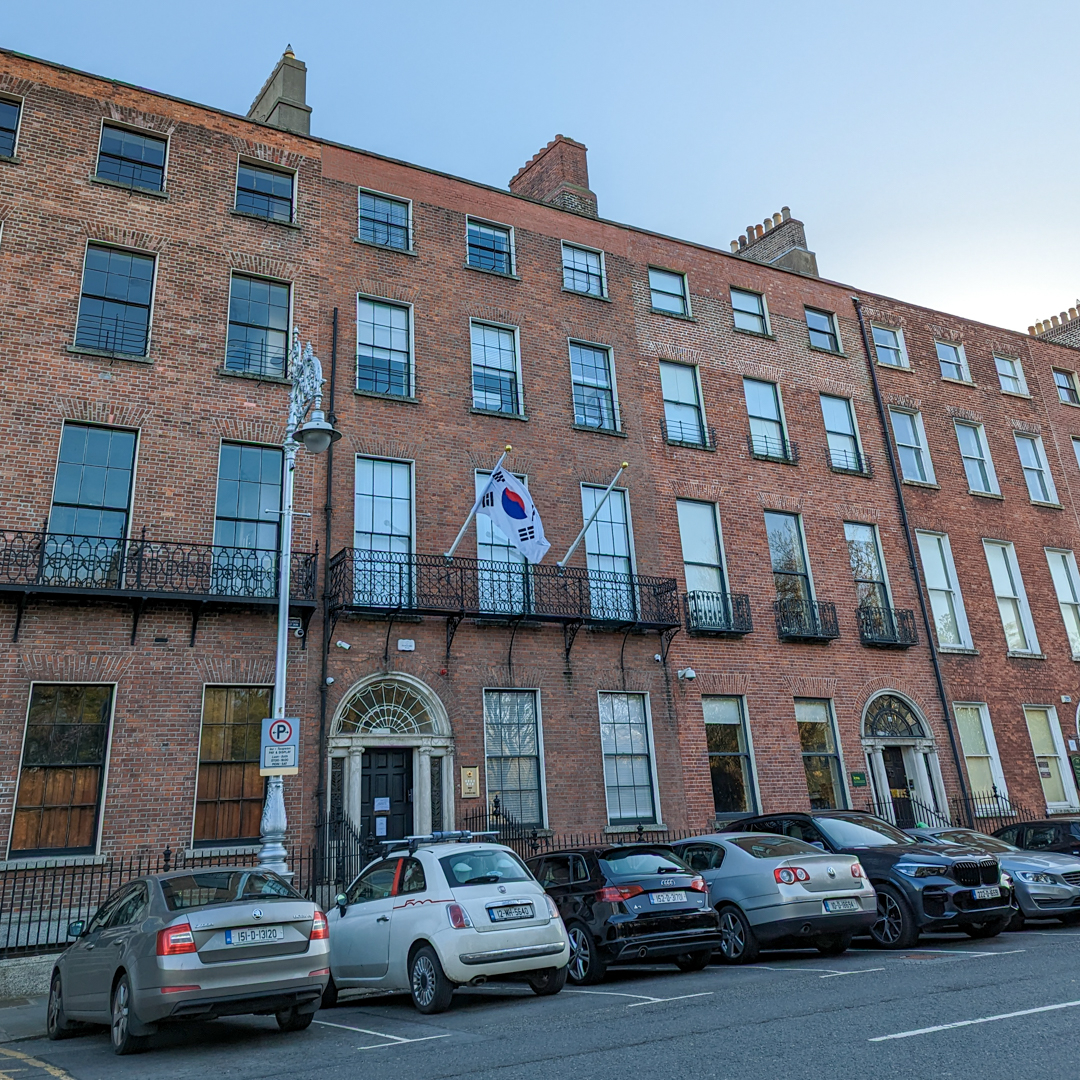
Embassy in Dublin

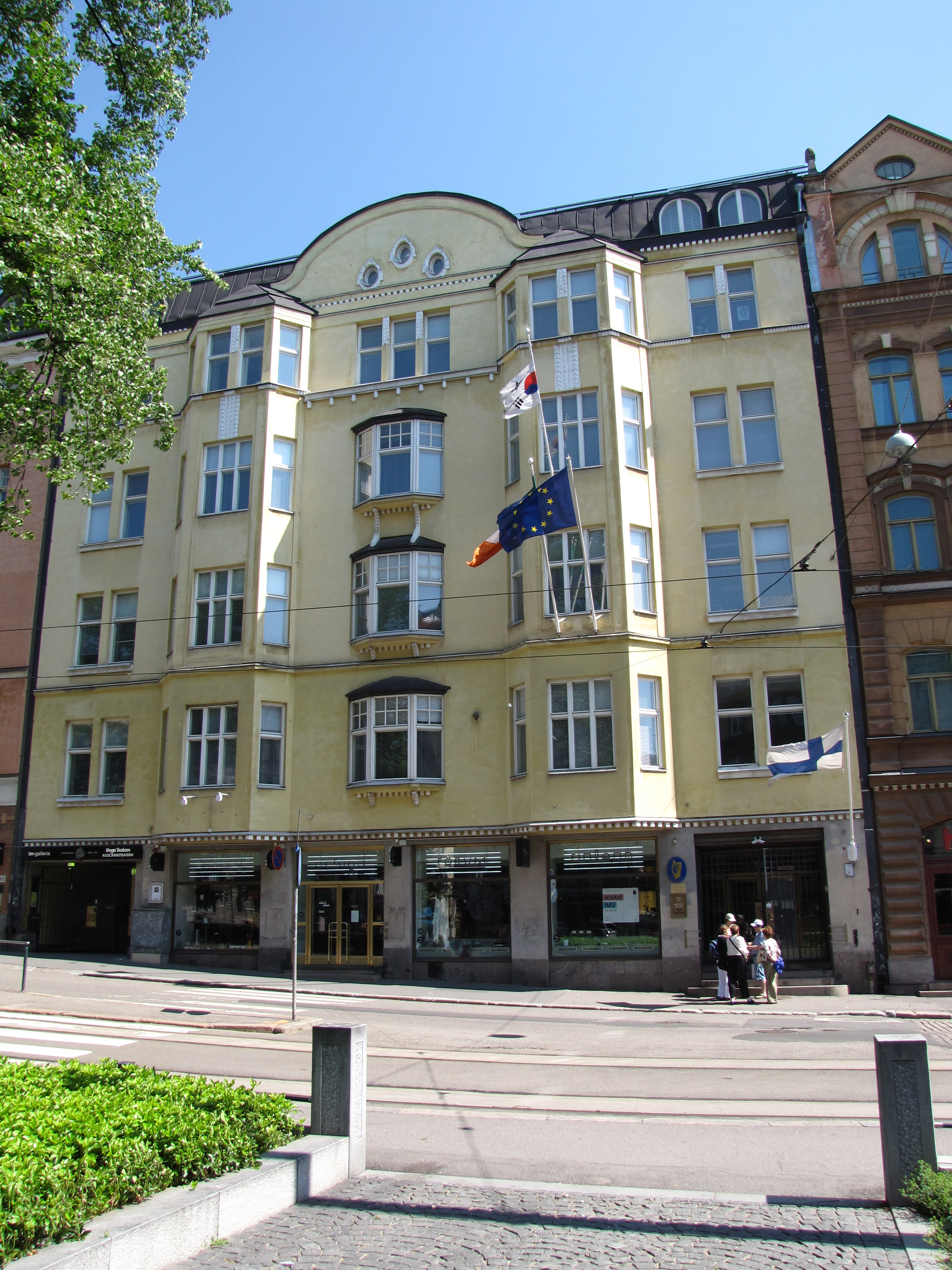
Embassy in Helsinki

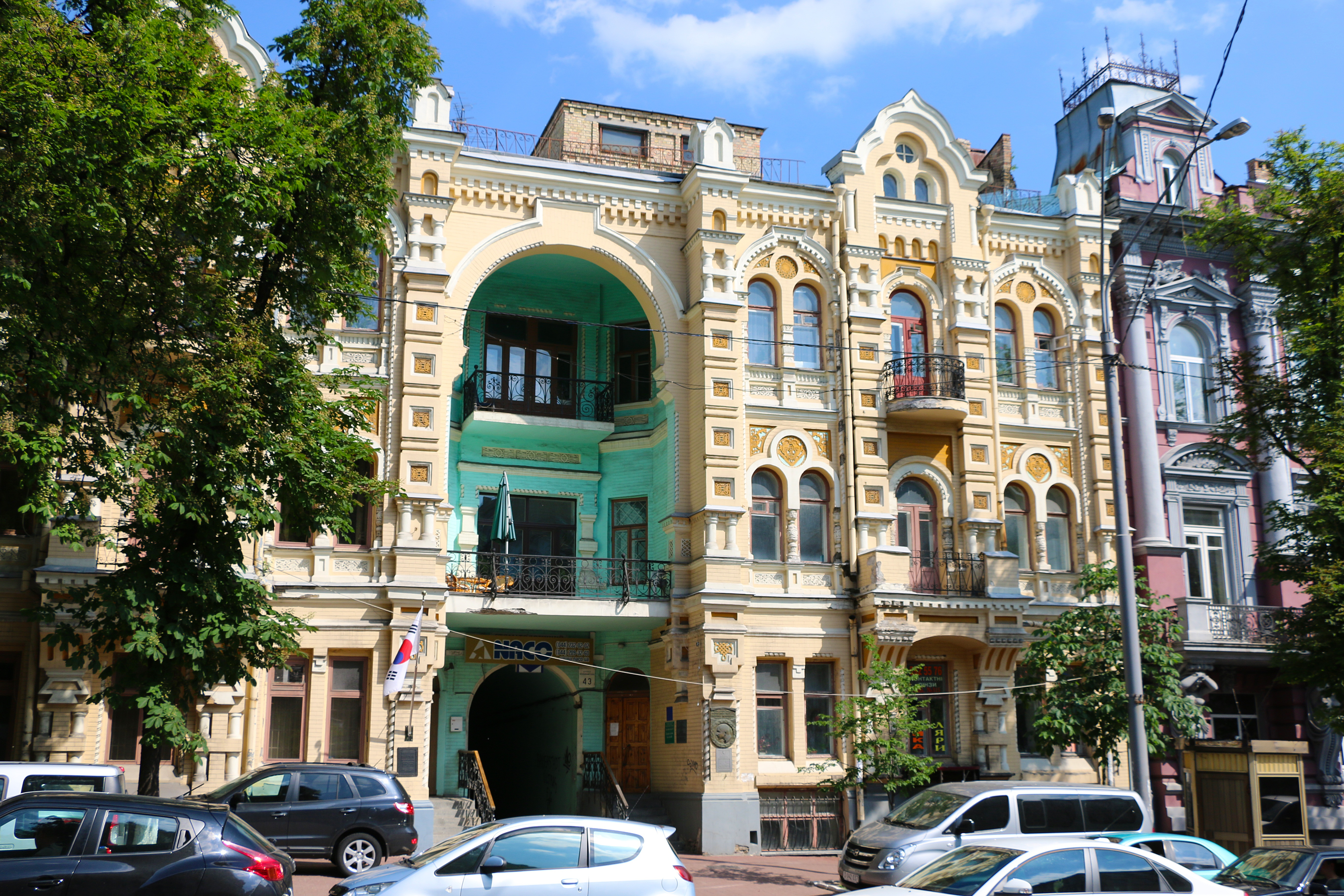
Embassy in Kyiv

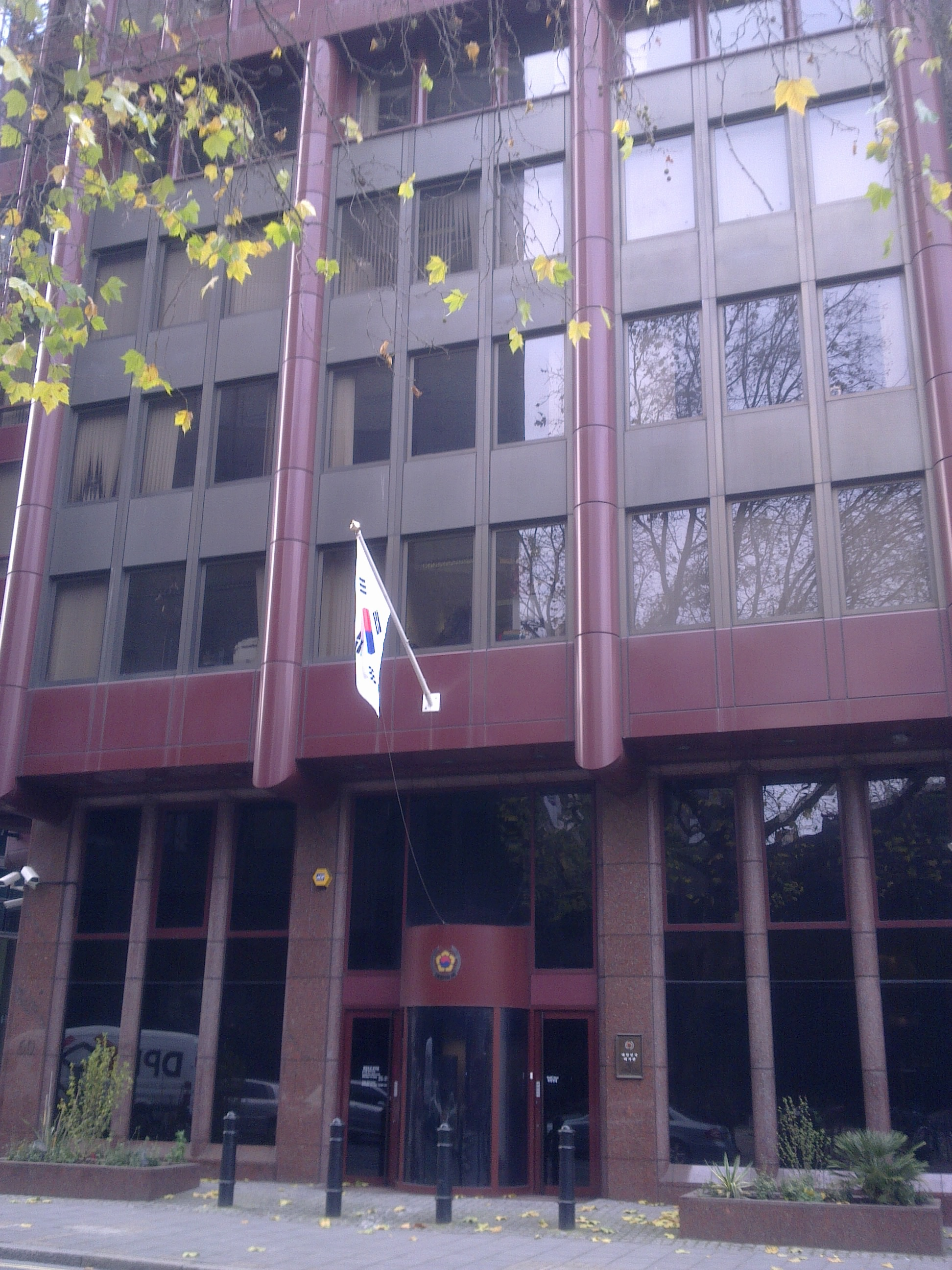
Embassy in London

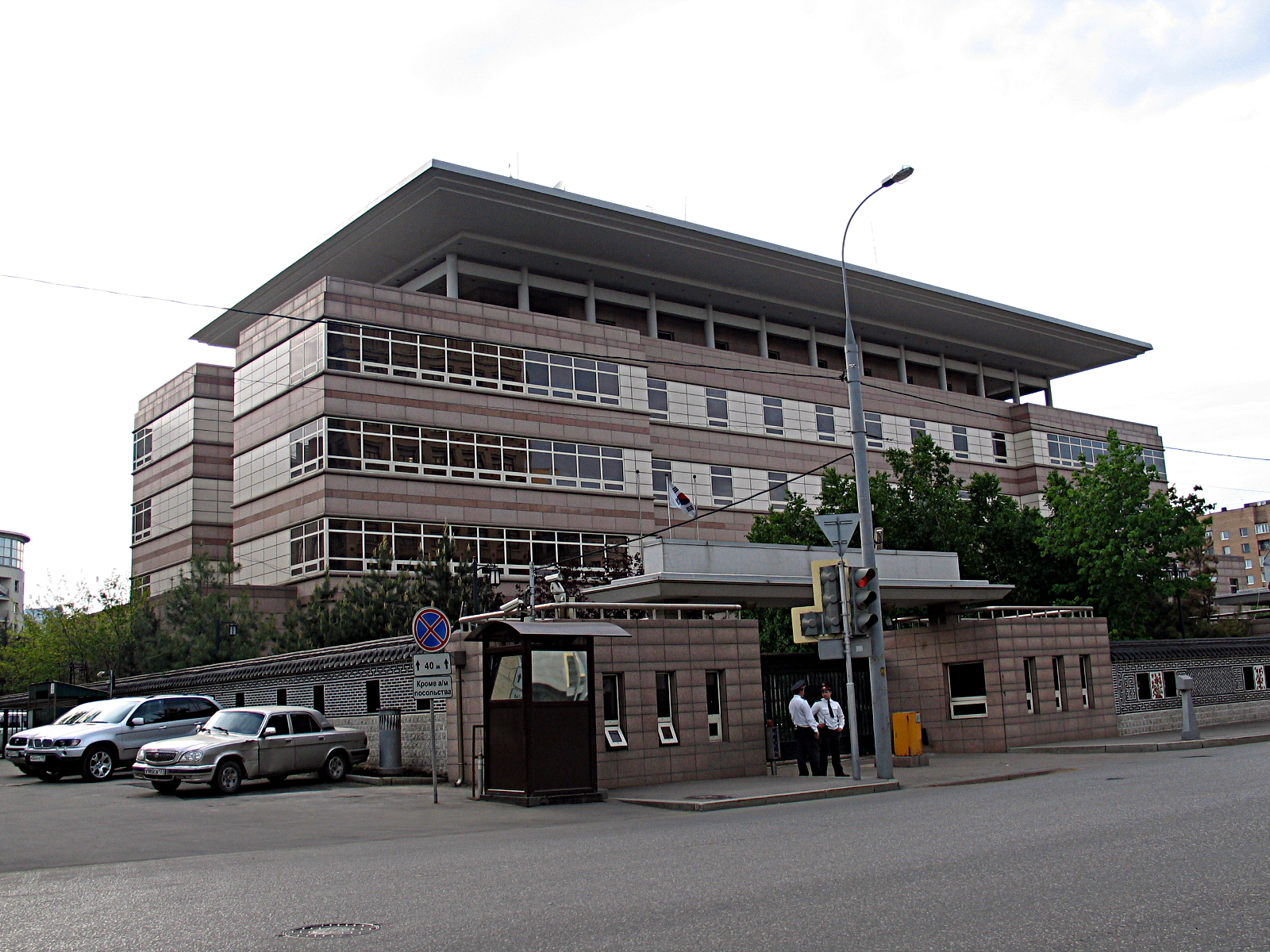
Embassy in Moscow

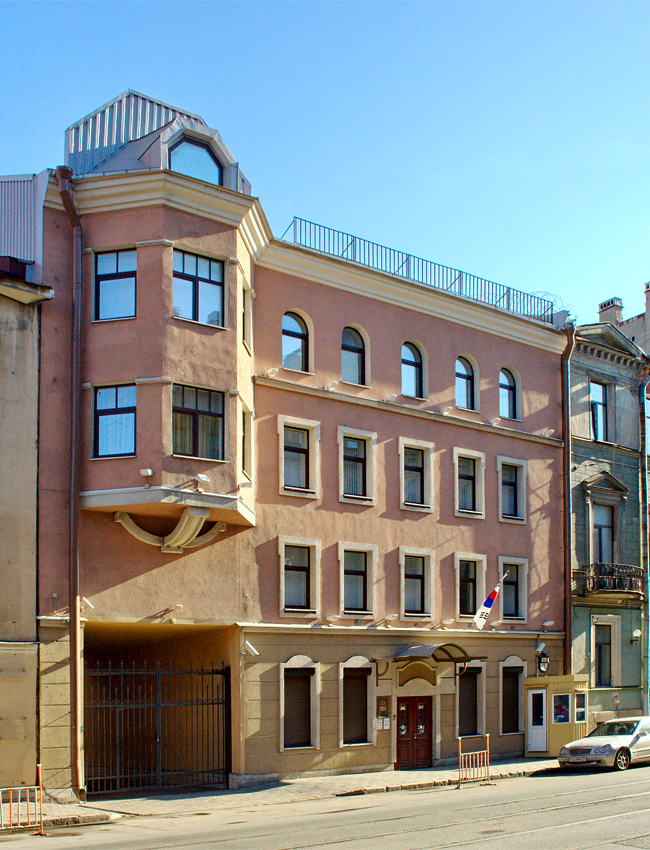
Consulate-General in Saint Petersburg

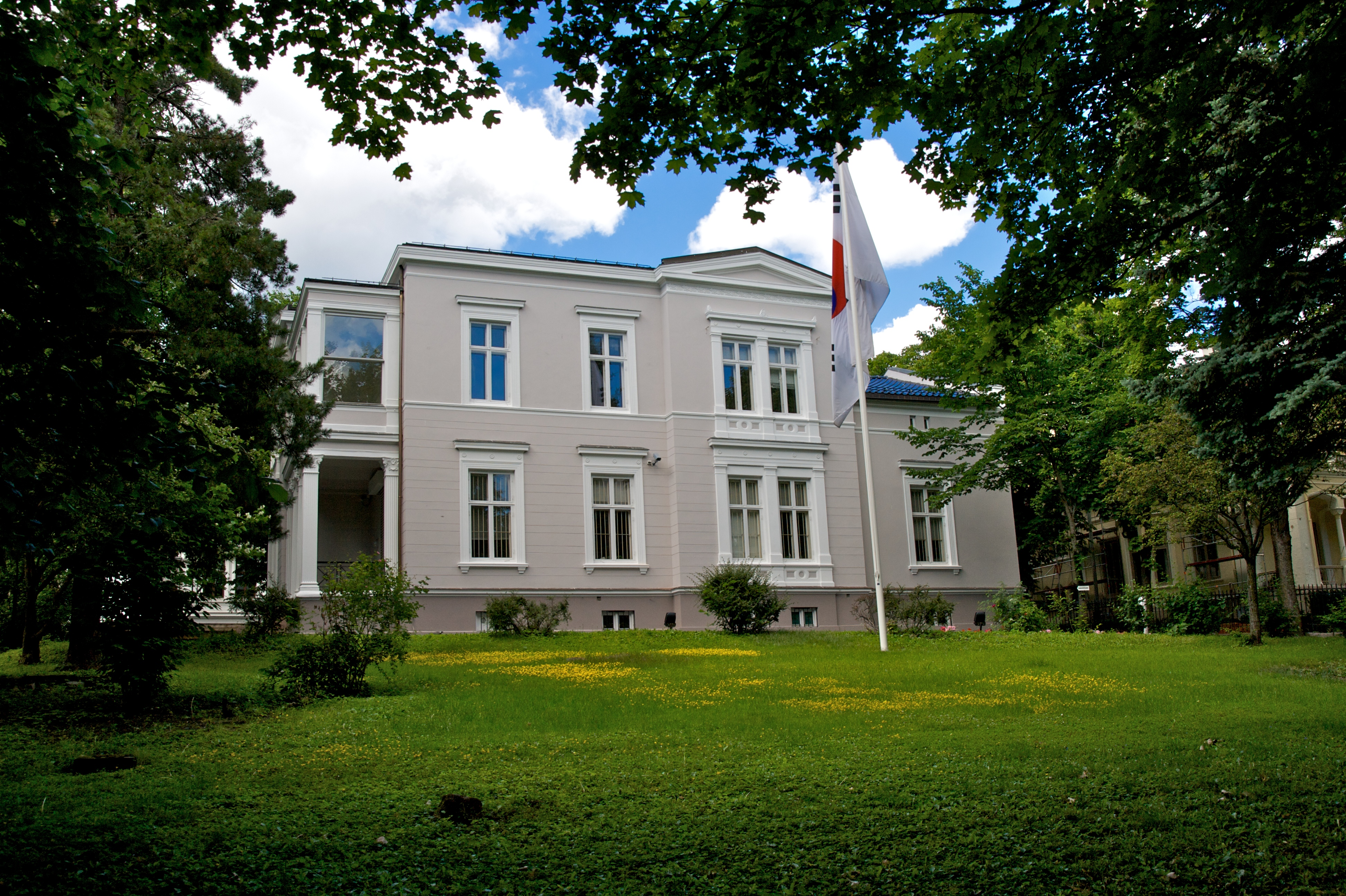
Embassy in Oslo

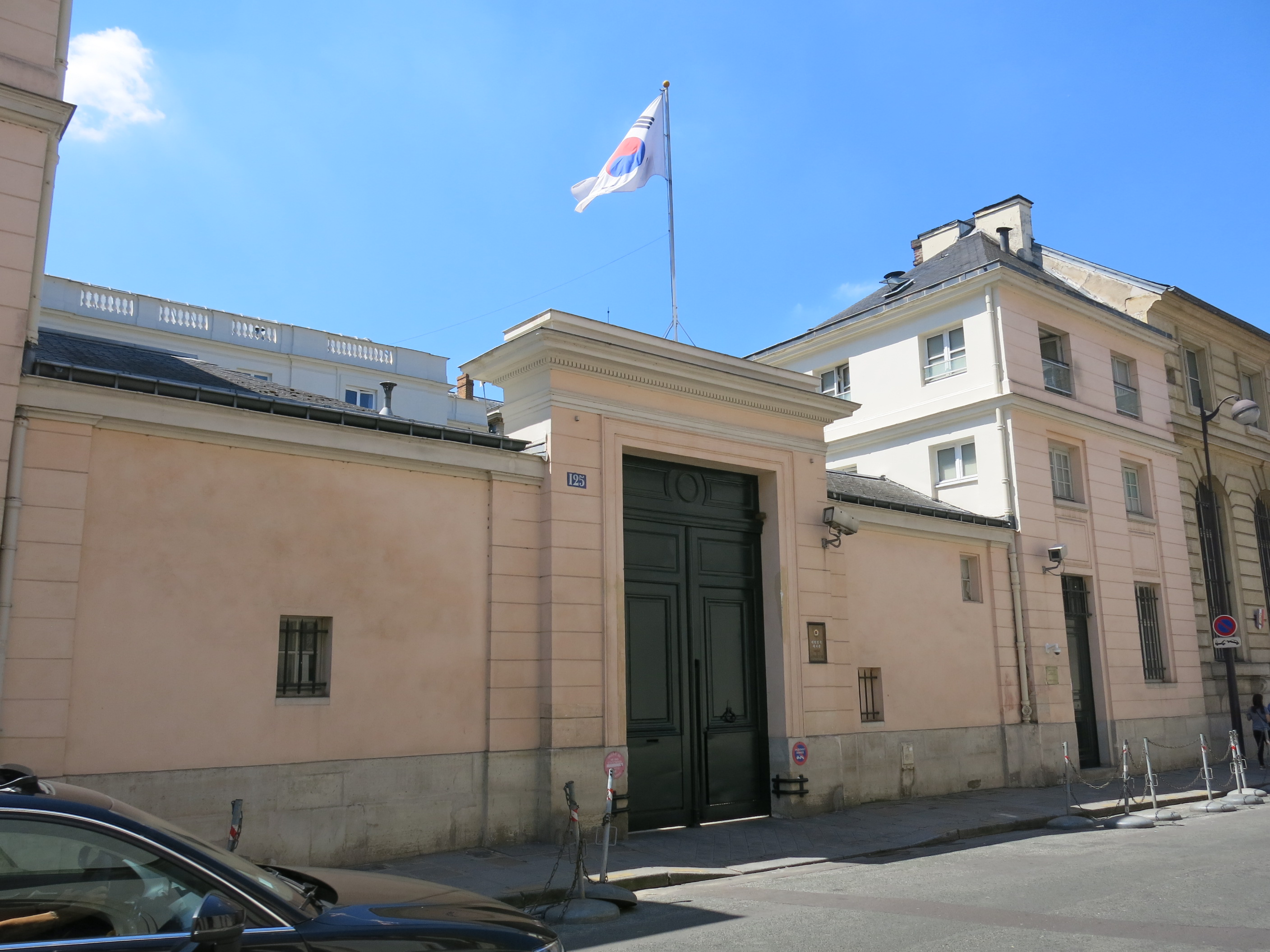
Embassy in Paris

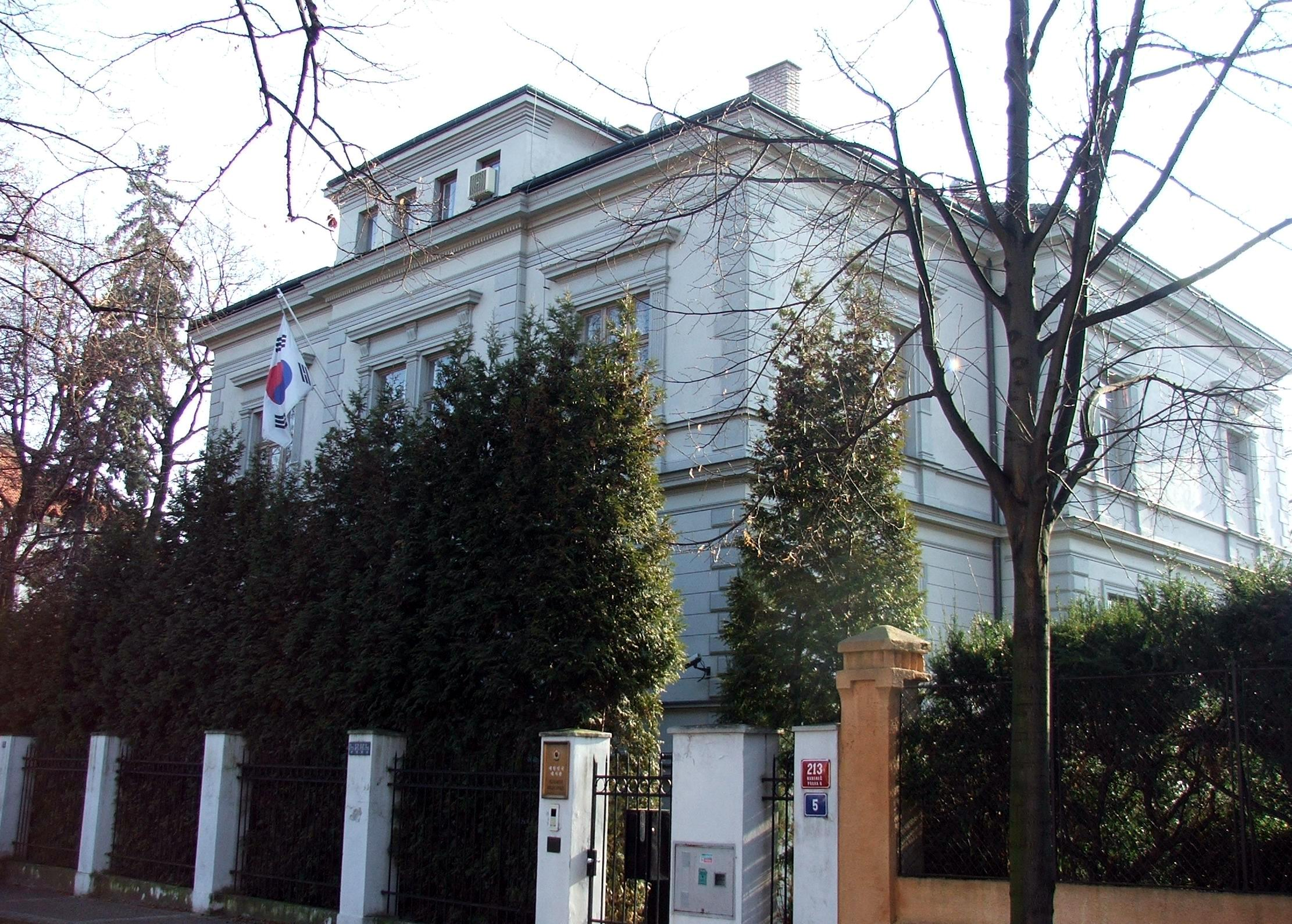
Embassy in Prague

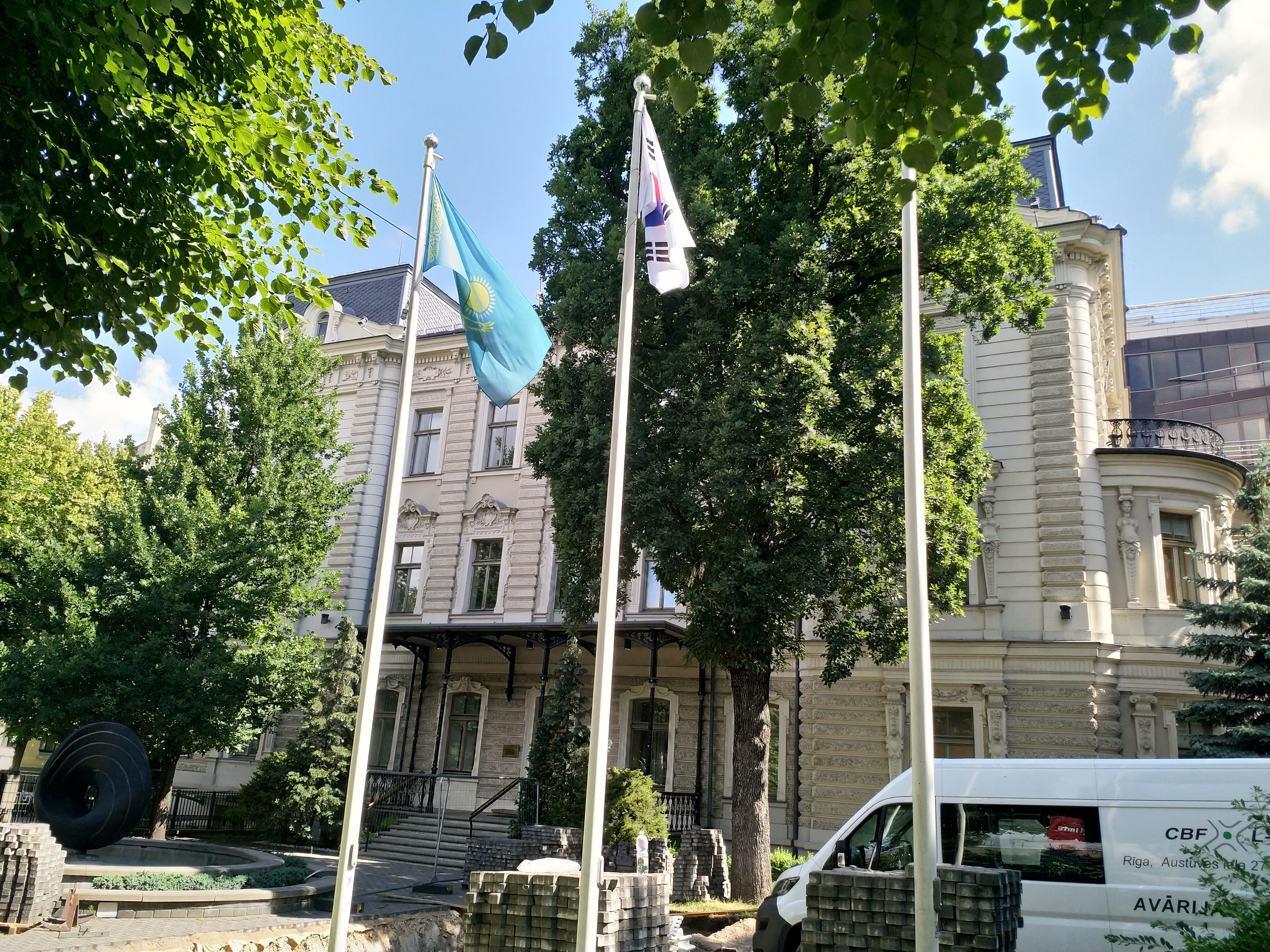
Embassy in Riga

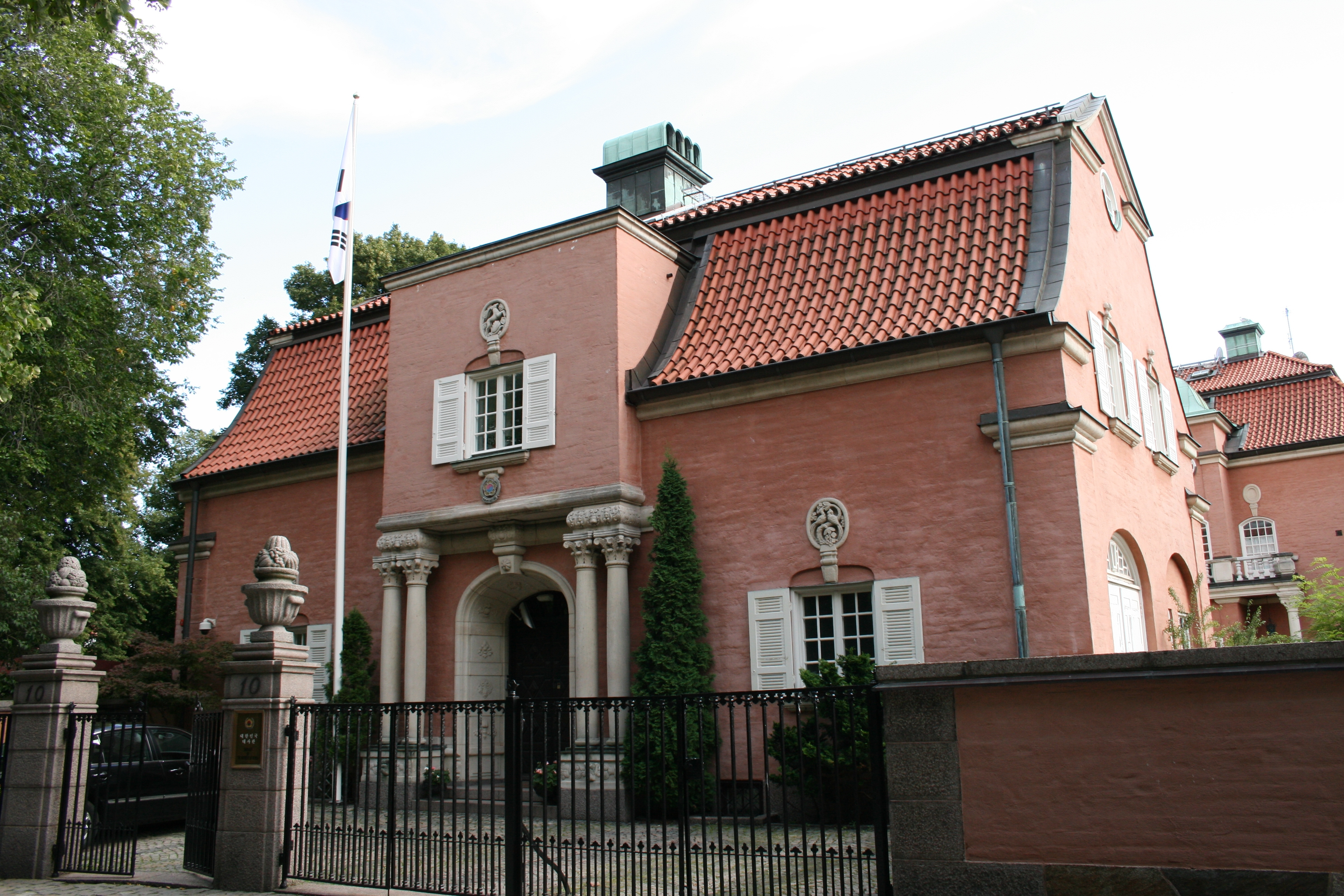
Embassy in Stockholm

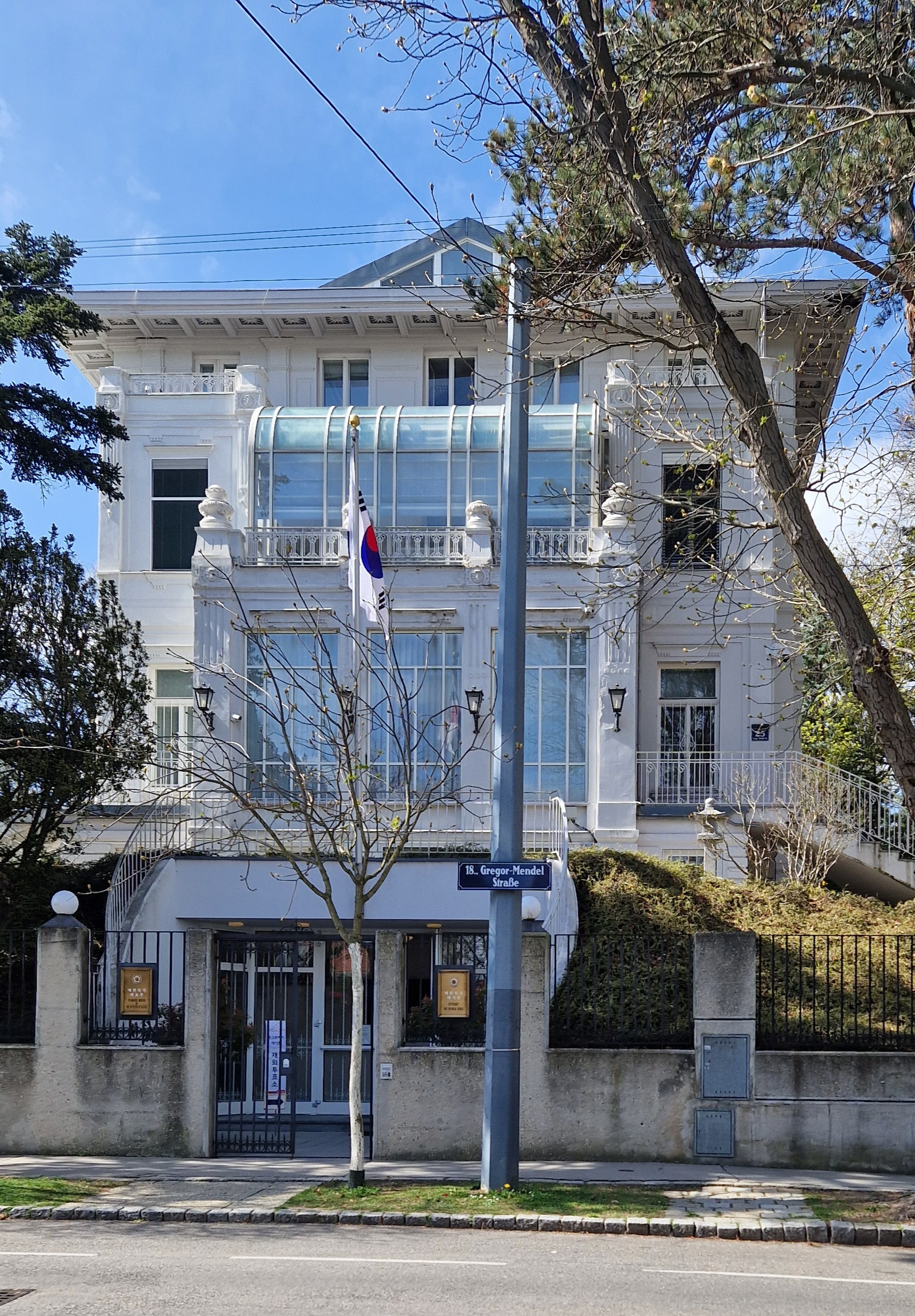
Embassy in Vienna

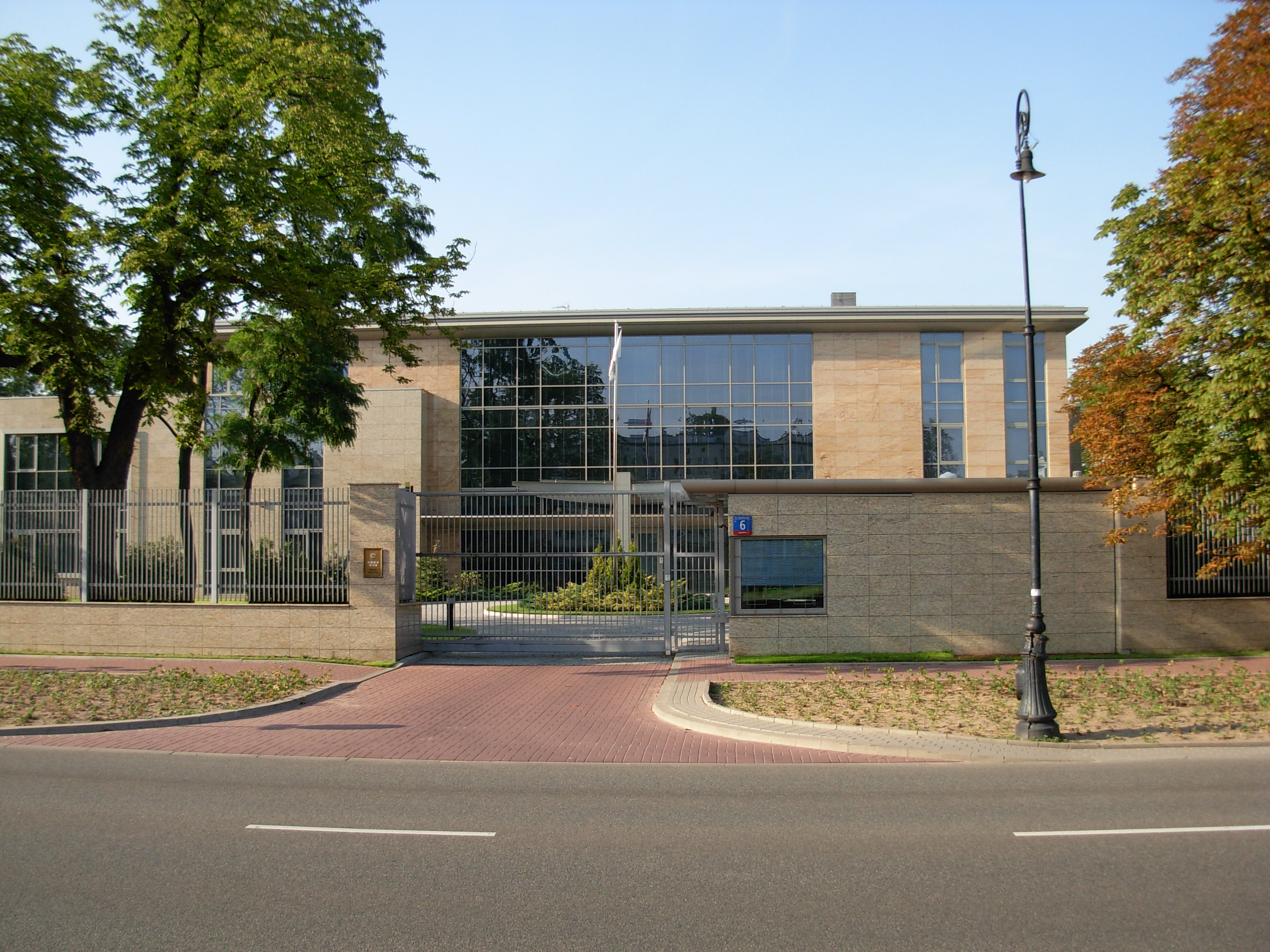
Embassy in Warsaw

=== Oceania ===
Host country	Host city	Mission	Concurrent accreditation	Ref.
Australia	Canberra	Embassy		
Australia	Sydney	Consulate-General		
Australia	Brisbane	Consulate		
Australia	Melbourne	Consulate		
Fiji	Suva	Embassy	Countries: Kiribati; Marshall Islands; Micronesia; Nauru; Tuvalu	
New Zealand	Wellington	Embassy	Countries: Cook Islands; Samoa; Tonga	
New Zealand	Auckland	Consulate	Countries: Cook Islands; Samoa; Tonga	
Papua New Guinea	Port Moresby	Embassy	Countries: Solomon Islands; Vanuatu	

Building hosting the Embassy in Wellington

=== International organizations ===
Organization	Host city	Host country	Mission	Concurrent accreditation	Ref.
ASEAN	Jakarta	Indonesia	Mission		
OECD	Paris	France	Permanent Delegation		
United Nations	New York City	United States	Permanent Mission		
United Nations	Geneva	Switzerland	Permanent Mission		
UNESCO	Paris	France	Permanent Delegation		

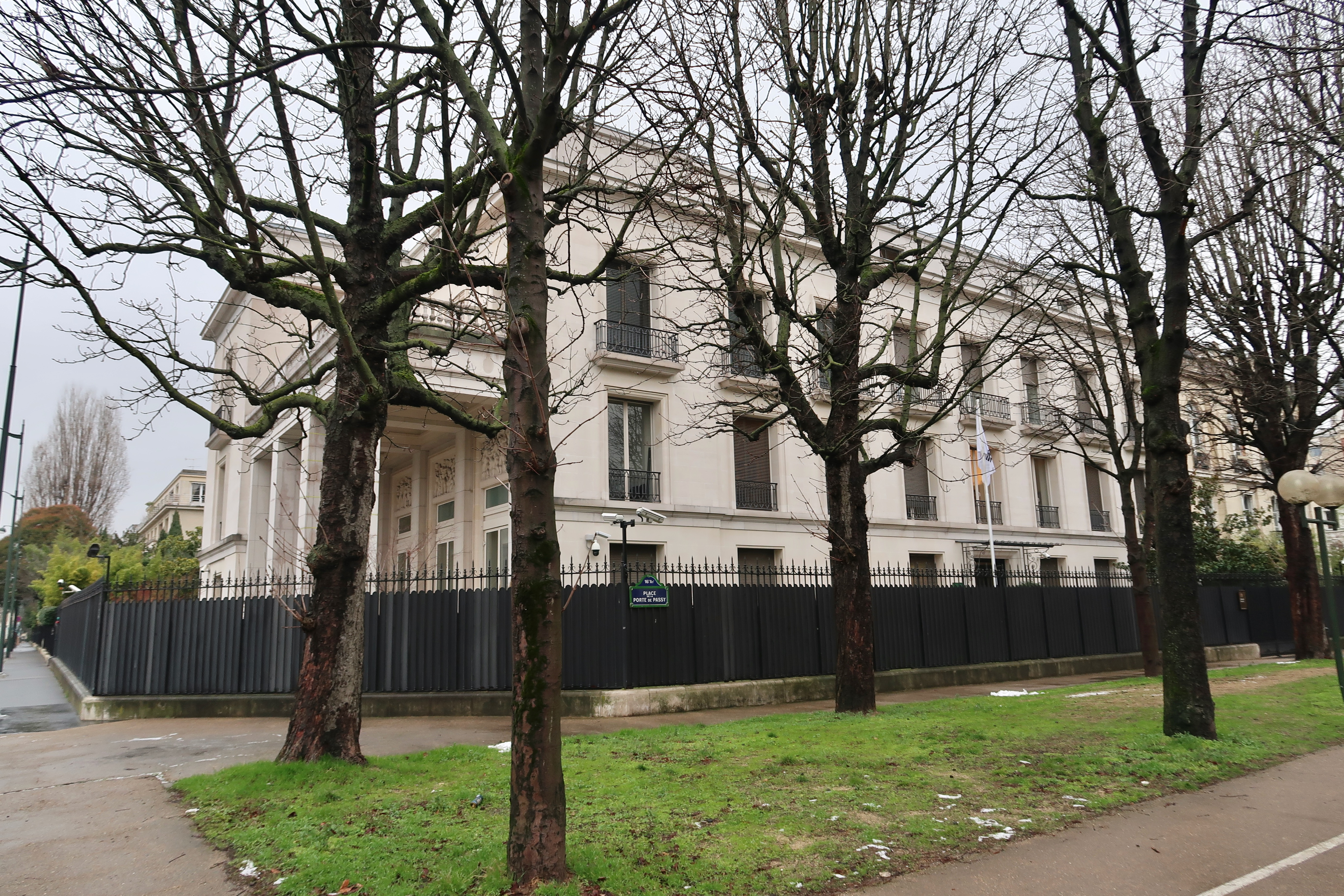
Permanent Delegation to the OECD in Paris

== Missions to open ==
- Syria

== Unverified concurrent accreditations of diplomatic missions ==
Cities of residence are in parenthesses

- Afghanistan (Doha) (Note: South Korea temperately closed its embassy due to the Taliban took control of Kabul in August 2021.)
- Eritrea (Khartoum)
- Kosovo (Vienna) (Note: Kosovo is only under the listed only under the consular jurisdiction of the South Korean embassy in Austria. As of 2025, both countries have yet to establish formal diplomatic relations.)
- South Sudan (Kampala)
- Yemen (Riyadh)

== Closed missions ==
=== Africa ===
Host country	Host city	Mission	Year closed	Ref.
Burkina Faso	Ouagadougou	Embassy	1989	
Central African Republic	Bangui	Embassy	1989	
Eswatini	Mbabane	Embassy	1993	
Liberia	Monrovia	Embassy	1992	
Malawi	Lilongwe	Embassy	1992	
Mauritania	Nouakchott	Embassy	1993	
Mauritius	Port Louis	Embassy	1992	
Namibia	Windhoek	Embassy	1995	
Niger	Niamey	Embassy	1989	
Somalia	Mogadishu	Embassy	1992	
Zambia	Lusaka	Embassy	1998	

=== Americas ===
Host country	Host city	Mission	Year closed	Ref.
Barbados	Bridgetown	Embassy	1989	
Haiti	Port-au-Prince	Embassy	1992	
Suriname	Paramaribo	Embassy	1993	
United States	Miami	Consulate-General	1999	

=== Asia ===
Host country	Host city	Mission	Year closed	Ref.
China	Macau	Consulate-General	2001	
Japan	Naha	Consulate	1995	
South Vietnam	Saigon	Embassy (Note: Continues as a consulate-general nowadays.)	1975	
Taiwan	Taipei	Embassy (Note: Continues as an Korean Mission in Taipei.)	1992	

=== Europe ===
Host country	Host city	Mission	Year closed	Ref.
Belgium	Brussels	Mission to the European Union	1998	
Germany	Berlin	Consulate-General	1999	

== See also ==
- Foreign relations of South Korea
- List of diplomatic missions in South Korea
- List of ambassadors of South Korea
- Visa policy of South Korea
