= List of diplomatic missions in Chennai =

This is a list of diplomatic missions in Chennai. Governments of several foreign nations have established diplomatic and trade representation in the city of Chennai. Many of them are at the consulate-general or deputy high commission level, in addition to a number of honorary consulates, with their respective embassies located at New Delhi. The consular presence in the city dates back to 1794, when William Abbott was appointed U.S. consular agent for South India. As of 2022, there were 60 foreign representations in Chennai, including 16 consulates general and 28 honorary consulates. The list is of countries that have established a resident consular presence in the city.

For other diplomatic missions in India, see List of diplomatic missions in India.

== Missions ==
Country	Mission type	Established	Headed by	Address	Neighborhood	Gallery
Angola	Honorary consulate		Capt. Guruswamy Ramaswamy	5th Floor, Amble Side, 8, Khadar Nawaz Khan Road	Nungambakkam	
Argentina	San Luis Commercial Office	7 May 2013	Adriel Dalgaard Knott, Director	61–63 Dr. Radhakrishnan Salai	Mylapore	
Armenia	Honorary consulate	24 December 2011	Shivkumar Eashwaran, honorary consul	Shivsu Towers, 149 Poonamallee High Road	Kilpauk	
Australia	Consulate general	1995	Sarah Kirlew, consul general (since January 2021)	9th Floor, Express Chambers, Express Avenue Estate, Whites Road	Royapettah	
Austria	Honorary consulate		Nina Kothari, honorary consul	Kothari Buildings, 115 Nungambakkam High Road	Nungambakkam	
Bangladesh	Deputy High Commission			No. 24/46, Agni Business Centre, First & Second Floor, K. B. Dasan Road	Alwarpet	
Canada	Trade Office		Subha Sundarajan, trade commissioner	Suite 205, Hotel Park Hyatt, 39 Velachery Road, Near Raj Bhavan	Guindy	
Chile	Honorary consulate		Sunita Shahaney, honorary consul	Oakland House, 7 Adayar Club Gate Road	R. A. Puram	
Czech Republic	Honorary consulate	13 March 2019	Ar Rm Arun, honorary consul	Vel Vilas, 3/21 Kottur Garden 3rd Main Road	Kotturpuram	
Denmark	Honorary consulate		Vijay Sankar, honorary consul	9 Cathedral Road	Gopalapuram	
El Salvador	Honorary consulate	11 January 2012	Yashwanth Kumar Venkataraman, honorary consul	18, 3rd Street, Nehru Nagar	Adyar	
Ethiopia	Honorary consulate	30 January 2012	Manikam Ramaswami	83 First Main Road	R. A. Puram	
Estonia	Honorary consulate	11 January 2017	G.S.K. Velu, honorary consul	15, 4th St, Vidhya Thirtha Nagar	Abiramapuram	
Fiji	Honorary consulate	March 2016	S.N. Srikanth, honorary consul	SVN House, 10, C.P. Ramaswamy Aiyar Road	Alwarpet	
Finland	Honorary consulate		M. Ct. P. Chidambaram, honorary consul	202 (Old 742) Anna Salai	Mount Road	
France	Branch office of the consulate general of France in Pondicherry		Lise Talbot Barré - consul general of France - Bureau de France—Chennai	6th Floor, Bannari Amman Towers, 29 Dr Radha Krishnan Salai	Mylapore	
Germany	Consulate general		Karin Christina Maria Stoll, consul general (since July 2018)	9 Boat Club Road	R. A. Puram	
Greece	Honorary consulate		N. Kumar, honorary consul general	37 Sterling Road	Nungambakkam	
Guatemala	Honorary consulate	March 2018	Vivek Partheeban, honorary consul	Caplin Point Laboratories Ltd. Narbhavi No. 3 Lakshman Street, G. N. Shetty Road	T. Nagar	
Hungary	Honorary consulate		M. A. Alagappan, honorary consul	Tiam House, 28 Rajaji Road	George Town	
Iceland	Honorary consulate		Kumaran Seetharaman, honorary consul	No.129, Estate Main Road, Industrial Estate	Perungudi	
Indonesia	Honorary consulate		Kannan Jaya Kumar, honorary consul	2-D, Eldorado Building, 2nd Floor, 112 Nungambakkam High Road	Nungambakkam	
Ireland	Honorary consulate	1 December 2011	Rajeev Mecheri, honorary consul	Mecheri Centre, 49 Eldams Road	Teynampet	
Italy	Vice consulate		Ram Javhermal Shahaney, vice-consul	Ashok Leyland Limited, 19 Rajaji Salai	George Town	
Japan	Consulate general	1966	Kojiro Uchiyama, consul general (since April 2018)	12/1 Cenetoph Road, 1st Street	Teynampet	
Kazakhstan	Honorary consulate	27 April 2017	Suraj Shantakumar, honorary consul			
Latvia	Honorary consulate		Narayanaswamy Ramchandran	Khivraj Complex II, 2nd Floor, 480, Anna Salai	Nandanam	
Liberia	Honorary consulate	VACANT				
Luxembourg	Honorary consulate		Seturaman Mahalingam, honorary consul	22 Karpagambal Nagar, Mylapore		
Malaysia	Consulate general	1961	Saravana Kumar Kumaravasagam	7 (Old 3) Cenotaph Road, 1st Street	Teynampet	
Maldives	Honorary consulate		Dr. Hisamuddin Papa, honorary consul	No.786, Anna Salai, Nandanam	Nandanam	
Malta	Honorary consulate	6 January 2010	Thangamuthu Pillai Shantakumar, honorary consul	10 II Street, Seethamal Colony	Alwarpet	
Mauritius	Honorary consulate		Ravi Raman, honorary consul	RR Tower, 94/95 Block 6, 8th Floor, Guindy Industrial Estate	Guindy	
Mexico	Honorary consulate	6 September 2016	Ramkumar Varadarajan, honorary consul	Casuarina Drive	Neelankarai	
Mongolia	Honorary consulate		C. N. Gangadaran, honorary consul	Agastyar Manor, 20 Raja Street	T. Nagar	
Myanmar	Honorary consulate		Prof. J Ranganathan, honorary consul	Hall Mark Towers, 550 TTK Road	Alwarpet	
Netherlands	Honorary consulate		Gopal Srinivasan, honorary consul	No. 249 A, Ambujammal Street, Off TTK Road	Alwarpet	
New Zealand	Honorary consulate		L. Ganesh, honorary consul	Rane Engine Valves Ltd, Maithri, 132 Cathedral Road	Gopalapuram	
North Macedonia	Honorary consulate		Arvind Gupta, honorary consul	17, Bishop Garden Road	R. A. Puram	
Norway	Honorary consulate		Arvind Gopinath, consul	Harbour Gate House, P.O. Box 1396, 44/45 Rajaji Salai	George Town	
Paraguay	Honorary consulate	2011	A. V. M. Balasubramanian, honorary consul	AVM Studios, NSK Salai	Vadapalani	
Philippines	Honorary consulate		Ashwin C. Muthiah, honorary consul	SPIC House, Annex Building, 8th Floor, 88 Anna Salai	Guindy	
Romania	Honorary consulate		Vijay Mehta, honorary consul	Apeejay House, 39/12 Haddows Road	Nungambakkam	
Russia	Consulate general	1947	Valerii Khodzhaev, consul general (since September 2024)	14 Santhome High Road	Mylapore	
Senegal	Honorary consulate		Ashok R. Thakkar	6, IInd Floor, Indian Chambers Building	George Town	
Serbia	Honorary consulate		Kartik Narayanan	SPP Complex, 324 Anna Salai	Nandanam	
Seychelles	Honorary consulate general		M. Sesha Sai Mechineni, honorary consul general (since 3 October 2018)	Hello Telecom (P) Ltd, 62 Veerabadran Street	Nungambakkam	
Singapore	Consulate general	17 September 1987	Roy Kho, consul general	17-A North Boag Road	T. Nagar	
Slovenia	Honorary consulate	27 December 2011	Amit Goel, honorary consul	Shanthi Apartments, Flat No. 4, 1st Floor, No. 22 Judge Jambulingam Road	Mylapore	
South Africa	Honorary consulate		R. Seshasayee, honorary consul	19 Rajaji Salai	George Town	
South Korea	Consulate general	7 February 2014	Chang-nyun Kim, consul general (since 2023)	29 Radhakrishnan Salai	Mylapore	
Spain	Honorary consulate		Antony Lobo, honorary consul	6, Nimmo Road	Santhome	
Sri Lanka	Deputy High Commission	1957	Ganesanathan Geathiswaran, deputy high commissioner	56 Sterling Road	Nungambakkam	
Sweden	Honorary consulate		Arun Vasu, honorary consul	6 Cathedral Road	Gopalapuram	
Switzerland	Honorary consulate		Sanjay Madhavan, honorary consul	# No. 7, Sriman Srinivasa Road,	Alwarpet, Chennai- 600018	
Republic of China (Taiwan)	Representative Office	2012	Frank Lin, director general	New No.30, Norton Road	Mandaveli	
Thailand	Consulate general	2005	Racha Areeprak, consul general (since 2024)	3 First Main Road, Vidyodaya Colony	T. Nagar	
Turkey	Honorary consulate		VACANT			
Turkmenistan	Honorary consulate		Ravi Appasamy, honorary consul	3 Mangesh Street	T. Nagar	
United Kingdom	Deputy High Commission		Halima Holland, deputy high commissioner (since November 2024)	20 Anderson Road	Nungambakkam	
United States	Consulate general	24 November 1794	Christopher W. Hodges, consul general (since July 2023)	220 Anna Salai	Gemini Circle	
Zambia	Honorary consulate	23 May 2008	N. Sukumar, honorary consul	Suba Solutions Pvt Ltd, 29 (Old No. 7) Devadi Street	Mylapore	

== Proposed missions ==
The agreement for establishing the Consulate General of People's Republic of China in Chennai, the capital city of the state of Tamil Nadu had been signed by the prime minister of India Narendra Modi and Chinese premier Li Keqiang, during Modi's three-day visit to China in May 2015.

In August 2017, Bangladesh government approved the opening of a consulate in Chennai. This was open before the end of 2019. In addition, the countries of United Arab Emirates, Saudi Arabia and Kuwait and Egypt have decided to open their diplomatic consulates in the city.

== See also ==
- List of diplomatic missions of India
- List of diplomatic missions in India
