= Consulate General of Malaysia, Chennai =

Diplomatic mission in India

Consulate General of Malaysia for Southern India Consulate General of Malaysia, Chennai
- மலேசியத் துணைதூதரகம், சென்னை
- Incumbent; Saravana Kumar Kumaravasagam since November 2022
- Ministry of Foreign Affairs
- Style: Consul General
- Inaugural holder: T. H. Yogaratnam
- Formation: 1961
- Website: Official website

The Consulate General of Malaysia for Southern India is one of the three missions of Malaysia in India focusing on Malaysian interests in the region. It is located in Chennai and its jurisdiction includes the states of Tamil Nadu, Andhra Pradesh, Telangana, Karnataka, Kerala and the union territory of Puducherry. The other two are the Malaysian High Commission in New Delhi and the Consulate General of Malaysia in Mumbai, in addition to an honorary office in Kolkata. The current Consul General of the Chennai Consulate is Saravana Kumar Kumaravasagam.

== Location of agencies ==
The Office of the Consulate General of Malaysia is located at No.7 (Old 3) Cenotaph Road 1st Street, Teynampet. Other offices operating under the Consulate General are Immigration agency, the Education and Training section (Public Services Department) and the Ministry of Human Resources. The Tourism Malaysia agency functions at 4 Kodambakkam High Road, Nungambakkam. The MATRADE office—the office of the Malaysia External Trade Development Corporation, the national trade promotion agency of Malaysia—operates from 554 and 555, Anna Salai, Teynampet. The Malaysian Airlines functions from Temple Tower No.672, Anna Salai, Nandanam.

== History ==
The Consulate General of Malaysia for Southern India in Chennai was established in 1961 as the Office of the Assistant High Commissioner for Malaysia in Chennai. The mission in Chennai is considered one of the first few Malaysian diplomatic missions established abroad following the establishment of Indian diplomatic relations with the Federation of Malaya (predecessor state of Malaysia) in 1957. and the Independence of Malaysia in the same year.

In November 2004, the Chennai mission was upgraded as the Consulate General of Malaysia for Southern India in Chennai by the Government of Malaysia through the notification issued by the Indian Ministry of External Affairs on 8 November 2004 in order to cater to the greater interests of Malaysia in the region by optimizing the role of the mission.

=== List of Assistant High Commissioners/Consuls General ===
Until the upgradation in 2004 as the Consulate General, the mission had Assistant High Commissioners heading it. Since 2004, the mission is being led by consuls general. Below is the list of Assistant High Commissioners/Consuls General of the Consulate General of Malaysia in Chennai:

Assistant high commissioners

1. T. H. Yogaratnam (1961–1964)
2. Razali Ismail (1964–1966)
3. Anaitullah B. Karim (1966–1969)
4. Alfred Kumarasari (1970–1972)
5. Kon Song Chee (1973 (6 months))
6. Dominic Mathews (1973–1974)
7. Low Tiam Kit (1974–1976)
8. Tuan Hj. Gulam Haniff (1976–1979)
9. Marzuki Mohd Noor (1980–1982)
10. Fauzi Yon (1982–1985)
11. Abdul Latif Awang (1985–1988)
12. Mahalil Hj. Baharam (1988–1992)
13. Shafie Abu Samah (1992–1996)
14. Ismail Ahmad (1997)
15. Mazlan Muhammad (1997–2001)
16. Y. M. Raja Ahmad Raja Daud (2001–2004)

Consuls general

1. Rosli B. Ismail (2004–2007)
2. Anuar Kasman (22 April 2008 – 2012)
3. Chitra Devi Ramiah (2012 – January 2016)
4. Ahmad Fajarazam bin Abdul Jalil (January 2016 – August 2017)
5. Saravanan Karathihayan (January 2018 – November 2022)
6. Saravana Kumar Kumaravasagam (November 2022 – present)

== Mission statement ==
The stated mission of the Consulate General of Malaysia in Chennai is as follows:

- Uphold the country's sovereignty and promote universal peace
- Foster friendly relations with foreign countries
- Develop and protect Malaysia's interests in the regional and international arena
- Ensure the safety and interests of Malaysians abroad
- Extend excellent and efficient services to the Ministry's stakeholders both locally and abroad

== Functions ==
The mission is headed by 18 diplomatic officers assigned by the Malaysian Ministry of Foreign Affairs. With the expansion to include various core areas, the office of the Consulate General is assisted by several agencies under the umbrella of the Consulate General to execute specific duties:

Agency function	Department	Year of establishment
Immigration and Consular Affairs	Department of Immigration, Malaysia	1983
Promoting Malaysia as a Tourist Destination	Tourism Malaysia under the Ministry of Tourism	2001
Promoting Bilateral Trade	Malaysian Trade and Development office (MATRADE)	2004
Education and Training	Counsellor of Education and Training Office, Public Service Department	2008
Labour Relations	Ministry of Human Resource	2009

Along with the Malaysian High Commission in New Delhi, the Consulate General in Chennai processes visa applications from Indian visitors. As of 2009, the Consulate General in Chennai issues more than 350 visas a day, including employment and tourist visas. The visa application centre in Chennai was established in 2011. Other visa applications centres are in Mumbai, New Delhi, Kolkata and Hyderabad.

== PERWAKILAN Chennai ==
The Ladies Association of the Consulate General of Malaysia in Chennai is known as PERWAKILAN Chennai. PERWAKILAN is an acronym of "Persatuan Wanita Kementerian Luar Negeri" meaning the "Malaysian Ministry of Foreign Affairs Ladies Association". It is a voluntary non-profit organization and was established following the establishment of the Consulate General. It is currently chaired by Mrs Visalakshi Suparamaiam, wife of the Consul General. Membership is automatically opened to wives of home-based staff of the Malaysian Consulate General Office and Malaysian Governmental Agencies in Chennai.

== See also ==
- List of diplomatic missions in Chennai
- List of diplomatic missions of Malaysia
- Foreign relations of Malaysia
- India–Malaysia relations
- Foreign relations of India
