= Consulate General of Germany, Chennai =

Diplomatic mission in India

Deutsches Generalkonsulat in Chennai Consulate General of the Federal Republic of Germany in Chennai
- ஜெர்மானியத் துணைதூதரகம், சென்னை
- Incumbent; Michaela Küchler since 2022
- Federal Foreign Office
- Style: Consul general
- Website: Official website

The Consulate General of the Federal Republic of Germany in Chennai represents the interests of the German government in Chennai and surrounding regions. The current Consul General is Michaela Küchler, incumbent since 2022. She succeeds Karin Christina Maria Stoll.

== Location ==
The Consulate General is located at 9 Boat Club Road, Raja Annamalaipuram. Until 2006, it was located at 22 Ethiraj Road, Egmore. The Goethe Institute, the cultural institute of Germany, is located at 4 Rutland Gate, 5th Street, Nungambakkam.

== History ==
With Calcutta-based German Consulate becoming the most important Consulate of the German Reich, the Madras and the Bombay consulates were placed under the jurisdiction of the German Consulate in Calcutta in 1886.

== Functions ==
The consular districts falling under the jurisdiction of the Chennai Consulate General are Tamil Nadu, Andhra Pradesh, Telangana, and the Union Territory of Puducherry. The consular services provided by the German Consulate Chennai to Indian Citizens include life certificates and pension certificates; attestation of documents, signatures and copies; German value added tax refund; and marriages both in India and Germany.

In June 2005, the Consulate General introduced an online appointment service for all categories of visa applications. The Consulate General processes visa applications from the states of Andhra Pradesh, Tamil Nadu and Puducherry. In 2006, the Consulate opened new visa application centres at Chennai, Hyderabad and Kochi. In 2008, the Consulate General of Germany, Bangalore started handling applications from residents in Karnataka and Kerala. The number of visas has been going up by 10% annually.

== List of consuls general ==
- Klaus Schroeder (2000)
- Hans-Burkhardt Sauerteig (–August 2011)
- Stefan Weckbach (August 2011–July 2014)
- Achim Fabig (July 2014–July 2018)
- Karin Christina Maria Stoll (July 2018–July 2022)
- Michaela Küchler (July 2022–date)

== Goethe Institut ==
The Goethe Institut Chennai, known locally as the Max Mueller Bhavan Chennai, is the cultural institute of the Federal Republic of Germany at Chennai. It was founded in 1960. Formerly located at Khader Nawaz Khan Road, Nungambakkam for 19 years since 1988, the centre was moved to a 13,000-sq-ft premises located at 4 Rutland Gate, 5th Street, Thousand Lights region of Chennai in 2007. It houses a library and information centre, language department, education department and culture department, in addition to an auditorium and an art gallery. The German Academic Exchange Services (Deutscher Akademischer Austausch Dienst or DAAD Information Centre) also functions from the Goethe Institut premises. The centre promotes knowledge of German language and fosters international cooperation by advancing Germany's cultural, social and political life.

=== DAAD Information Centre ===
The DAAD Information Center Chennai is a service centre for Indian students and scholars established by the German Academic Exchange Service in cooperation with Goethe Institut Chennai. Established in October 2001, the centre provides comprehensive and free counselling to students planning to study and research in Germany. The DAAD Information Center Chennai offers counselling services for the Southern region of India covering Tamil Nadu, Karnataka, Andhra Pradesh, and Kerala. Services include information session on higher studies and research opportunities in Germany, individual counselling, annual education fairs and presentation at partner institutions, universities, or special occasions.

== See also ==
- List of diplomatic missions in Chennai
- List of diplomatic missions of Germany
- Foreign policy of Germany
- Foreign relations of India
- Foreign relations of Germany
- Germany–India relations
