= Port of Vladivostok =

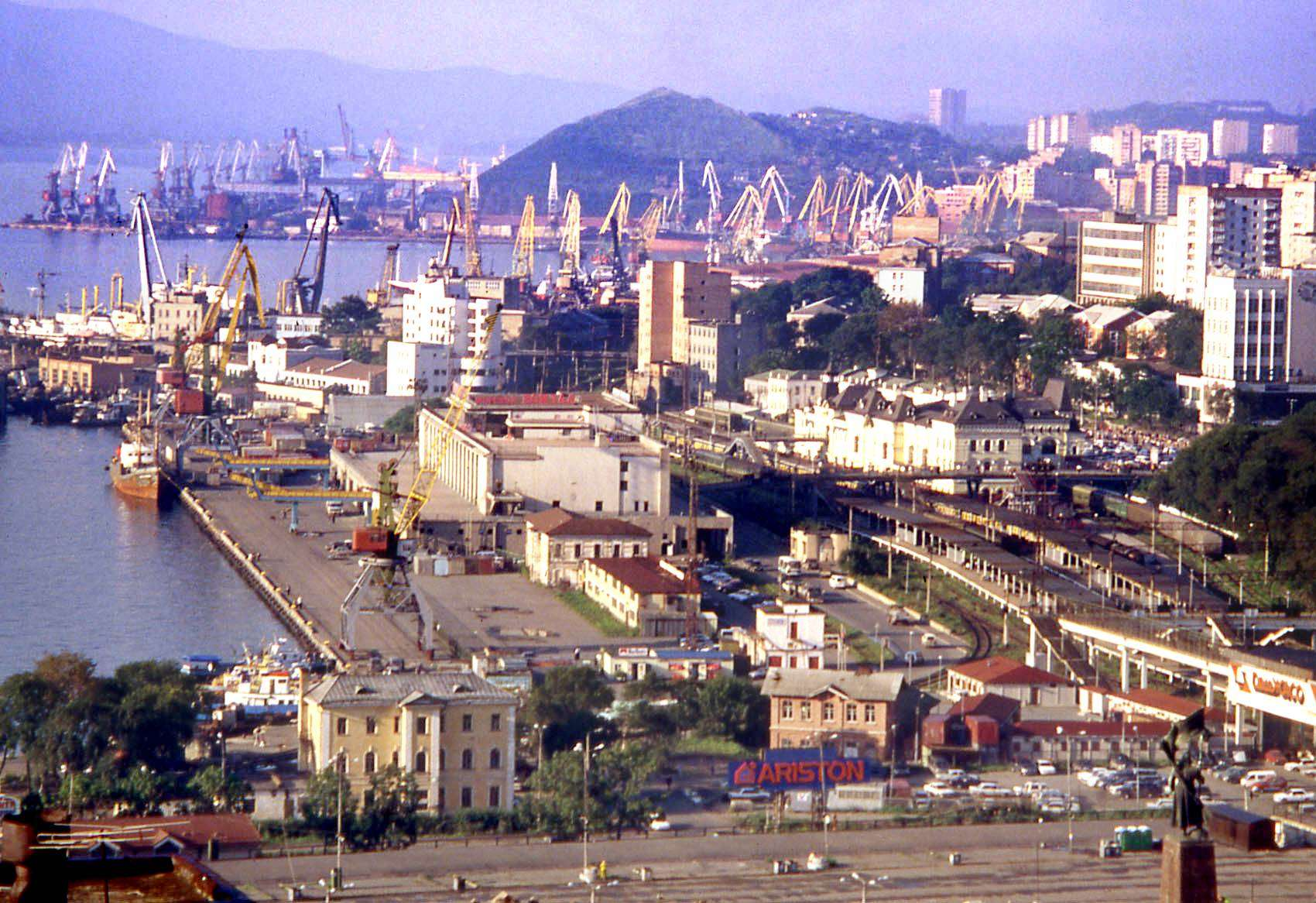
- Port of Vladivostok
- Interactive map of Port of Vladivostok

Location
- Country: Russia
- Location: Vladivostok, Primorsky Krai
- Coordinates: 43°06.3′N 131°55.3′E

The Port of Vladivostok is a seaport in Vladivostok, Primorsky Krai, Russia.

== Developments ==
In September 2019, Indian Prime Minister Narendra Modi signed a Memorandum of Intent for the Chennai–Vladivostok Maritime Corridor, a sea route covering approximately 5,600 nautical miles, or about 10,300 km, aimed at increasing bilateral trade between India and Russia.
