= Consulate General of Russia, Chennai =

Diplomatic mission in India

Coordinates: 13.03554546064717°N 80.27794892124761°E

Consulate General of the Russian Federation in Southern India Consulate General of the Russian Federation in Chennai Генеральное консульство России в Ченнаи ரஷ்யத் துணைதூதரகம், சென்னை
- Location: Chennai
- Address: No.33 (old No.14), Santhome High Road, Mylapore; Chennai-600004
- Consul General: Valerii Khodzhaev
- Website: chennai.mid.ru

The Consulate General of the Russian Federation in Chennai (Russian: Генеральное консульство России в Ченнаи) represents the interests of the Russian government in the southern region of India. The other missions are the Embassy of the Russian Federation in New Delhi and the Consulate General of the Russian Federation in Kolkata and Mumbai. The current Consul General is Valerii Khodzhaev, incumbent since September 2024. He succeeds Oleg N. Avdeev.

The facility serves Andhra Pradesh, Karnataka, Kerala, Tamil Nadu, Telangana and Puducherry.

== History ==
Russia had wanted to strengthen commercial, cultural and literary ties with India as early as 1860 when it wanted to open diplomatic office in India. However, the then British government in India was against it. In November 1900, Russia opened its first consulate in Mumbai. In 1910, the consulate was moved to Kolkata. However, it was only on April 12, 1947, a few months before India attained Independence, did Russia open its embassy in New Delhi.

The Chennai consulate was opened in 1947. The first contacts between Chennai and Volgograd in the Russian Federation were established in 1967 when a document of friendship, solidarity and cultural co-operation was signed. The Russian Centre of Science and Culture (formerly known as the House of Soviet Cultural Centre), the cultural wing of the consulate, was established in 1972 to promote cultural relationship between peoples of India and Russia. On 14 August the same year, Tal Chess Club, the city's first formal chess club was started in the library of the centre by Manuel Aaron. It went on to produce several chess grandmasters in the city, including India's first grandmaster Vishwanathan Anand.

In 2022, the consulate celebrated its 75 years of diplomatic relations with India.

== Location ==
The Consulate General is located at 14 Santhome High Road, Mylapore, near the Marina Beach. The Russian Cultural Centre, the Cultural Department of the Consulate General of the Russian Federation in Chennai, is located at 27, Kasturi Ranga Road, Alwarpet.

== Functions ==
The Russian Consulate in Chennai administrates the consular functions in the states of Andhra Pradesh, Telangana, Karnataka, Kerala and Tamil Nadu, and the Union Territory of Puducherry. As of 2009, the consulate handles around 10 to 15 percent of the total visa applicants to Russia. Over 1,600 people applied for visas to Russia in 2008, an increase of nearly 7 percent from the previous year, a majority of which were business visas (36.9 percent), students visas and tourists visas.

In December 2014, a new specialised Russian visa application centre was opened in the city at 74 Kasturi Ranga Road, Alwarpet, along with three such centres in New Delhi, Mumbai, and Kolkata. As of 2020, the visa application centre functions at Ispahani Center, 123/124 Nugambakkam High Road, Nungambakkam.

The consulate also functions as special polling station to help Russian nationals in South India, including tourists and residents, to cast their votes for Russian parliamentary polls.

== List of consuls general ==
- Mikhail M. Mgeladze (2002–2006)
- Vladislav V. Antonyuk (2006–2010)
- Nikolay A. Listopadov (2010–May 2014)
- Sergey L. Kotov (28 May 2014–September 2018)
- Oleg N. Avdeev (12 September 2018–September 2024)
- Valerii Khodzhaev (September 2024–Date)

== Russian Centre of Science and Culture ==
The Russian Centers of Science and Culture (RCSC) in Chennai is one of five such centers in India, the other four being those in New Delhi, Mumbai, Kolkata, and Thiruvananthapuram. The centre acts as the Indian counterpart of the Jawaharlal Nehru Cultural Center in Moscow and contribute to the development of cultural relations between the two countries.

Located at 74 Kasturi Ranga Road in Alwarpet, the Russian Centre of Science and Culture has an auditorium with seating capacity of 260 seats, an art gallery situated on the ground floor hosting various exhibitions of arts and paintings. The library consists of about 10,000 books, including a collection of Russian classical literature and rare translations of Russian authors, besides Russian newspapers and periodicals.

The Institute of Russian Language at the centre functions to propagate Russian language in South India. In 2010, the Russian Centre of Science and Culture started Russian language training programmes for college students through video conferencing. Other functions of the centre include conducting Russian education fairs, cultural exhibitions, and screening Russian films.

=== Incidents ===
On 6 June 2022, a minor fire broke out at the Russian Cultural Centre at around 12:50 p.m. However, there were no casualties reported.

== Economic developments in the region ==
Following the 2019 Eastern Economic Forum, Chennai–Vladivostok Maritime Corridor, a sea route covering nearly 5,600 nautical miles (10,300 km) to connect Russia's Far East, was proposed at the 20th India–Russia Summit to increase bilateral trade between India and Russia. In September 2019, a memorandum of intent for the route was signed by Prime Minister Narendra Modi in Vladivostok.

== First letter to space ==
The first letter ever to a post office in space from India was sent from the Russian Consulate in Chennai. According to the 2018 Limca Book of Records, Reagan Jones, a person known for his prolific letter writing, sent his letter containing greetings for space scientists from Vandiperiyar post office to the Soviet Consulate General in Chennai. The Chennai Consulate further sent the letter on to Moscow, where it was sent to the post office in space using radio waves.

== See also ==
- List of diplomatic missions in Chennai
- List of diplomatic missions of Russia
- Russian Ministry of Foreign Affairs
- India–Russia relations
- Foreign policy of Russia
- Foreign relations of India
