= Consulate General of South Korea, Chennai =

Diplomatic mission of South Korea in India

Consulate General of the Republic of Korea, Chennai
- 주 첸나이 대한민국 총영사관 தென் கொரியத் துணைதூதரகம், சென்னை
- Emblem of South Korea
- Incumbent; Chang-nyun Kim since 2023
- Ministry of Foreign Affairs
- Style: Consul General
- Inaugural holder: Kyungsoo Kim
- Formation: 7 February 2014
- Website: Official website

The Consulate General of South Korea in Chennai is one of the missions of South Korea in India focusing on Korean interests in the region. It is located in Chennai and its jurisdiction includes the states of Tamil Nadu, Andhra Pradesh, Karnataka, Kerala and the union territory of Puducherry. The other South Korean missions in the India is the Embassy of the Republic of Korea at New Delhi and the Consulate General of the Republic of Korea in Mumbai, in addition to an honorary consulate office in Kolkata. The fourth and current consul general of the Chennai Consulate is Chang-nyun Kim. He was preceded by Kwon Young Seup, the third consul general of the Chennai Consulate.

== Location ==
The office of the Consulate General of South Korea at fifth floor of Bannari Amman Towers located at 29 Dr. Radhakrishnan Salai, Mylapore.

== History ==
Soon after the economic liberalization by the Indian government in the 1990s, several Korean companies started setting up their bases in and around Chennai, chiefly in the automotive and electronic sectors. Since then, South Korea has had one of the largest foreign presences in the region. By 2014, there were about 4,000 Koreans staying in and around the city and there were large firms including Hyundai Motors, Samsung Electronics, Lotte India and Doosan Heavy Industries, among others, functioning in the region, in addition to about 150 small and medium enterprises run by Koreans. These employ 300,000 Indian citizens and create 1.5 million jobs indirectly. There was an honorary consulate of South Korea functioning at 12 Khader Nawaz Khan Road, Nungambakkam before the establishment of the Consulate General. However, the growing Korean population in the region demanded a full-fledged office in South India. The Consulate General was inaugurated on 7 February 2014 by the then Governor of Tamil Nadu, Konijeti Rosaiah. Commencement of visa processing services by the Consulate would begin on 17 February 2014, when visa applications from Tamil Nadu, Kerala, Karnataka, and Puducherry states would be processed directly at the consulate.

In September 2023, the Consulate General opened its new visa application center in the city.

== List of Consuls General ==
Heads of the South Korean mission to Chennai
No.	Names	Tenure started	Tenure ended	Ref
Consuls General
1	Kyungsoo Kim	7 February 2014	2017	
2	Kim Hyung Tae	2017	2020	
3	Kwon Young Seup	2020	2023	
4	Chang-nyun Kim	2023	Present	

== Other activities ==
In 2022, the Consulate organized India's first Korean Fair, a 4-day exhibition promoting Korean culture and consumer goods, in Chennai. The fair was held in Express Avenue Mall from November 17 to November 20, with 20 exhibitors from Korea. The Consulate has also arranged chartered flights for Korean nationals to visit India during emergencies such as the COVID-19 pandemic.

== See also ==
- List of diplomatic missions in Chennai
- List of diplomatic missions of South Korea
- Foreign relations of South Korea
- India–South Korea relations
- Foreign relations of India
