= List of diplomatic missions of Malaysia =

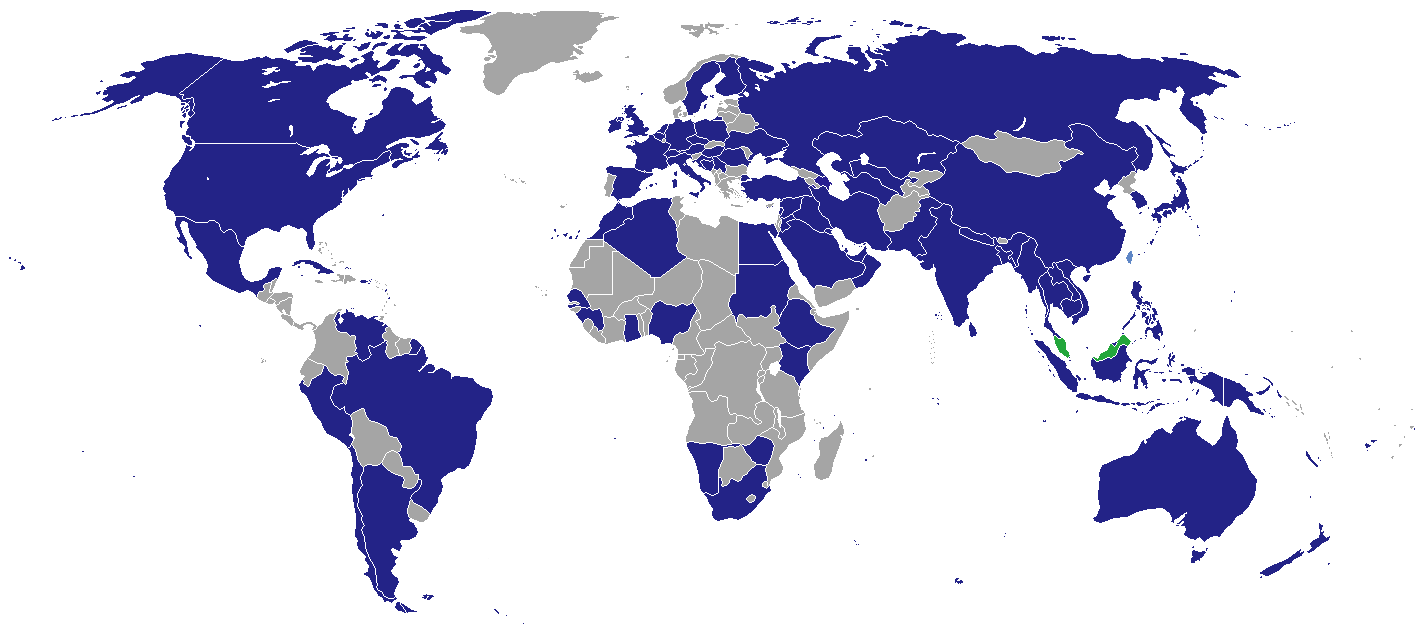
Diplomatic missions of Malaysia

This is a list of diplomatic missions of Malaysia.

Trade offices and honorary consulates are excluded from this listing.

== History ==
Malaysia's foreign ministry started in 1956 - a year before the country's independence - when Malaysia's Father of Independence established its offices at the Sultan Abdul Samad Building in Kuala Lumpur. Then, it was one of only four ministries established by the late Tunku Abdul Rahman. The Ministry of Foreign Affairs started with a staff of eleven British and Australian-trained foreign service officers. It initially had missions in London, Canberra, New Delhi, Tokyo, Bangkok, and Washington, growing to fourteen missions in 1963, 21 missions in 1965 and 106 missions by 2008. In those early days, the Permanent Mission of Malaysia to the UN in New York also doubled up as the Embassy of Malaysia to the United States.

== Current missions ==
=== Africa ===
Host country	Host city	Mission level	Concurrent accreditation	Ref.
Algeria	Algiers	Embassy	Countries: Tunisia	
Egypt	Cairo	Embassy		
Ethiopia	Addis Ababa	Embassy	Multilateral Organizations: African Union	
Ghana	Accra	High Commission	Countries: Niger; Sao Tome and Principe; Togo	
Guinea	Conakry	Embassy	Countries: Guinea-Bissau; Ivory Coast; Liberia; Sierra Leone	
Kenya	Nairobi	High Commission	Countries: Burundi; Rwanda; Somalia; South Sudan; Tanzania; Uganda; Multilateral Organizations: United Nations; United Nations Environment Programme; United Nations Human Settlements Programme	
Morocco	Rabat	Embassy	Countries: Mauritania	
Namibia	Windhoek	High Commission	Countries: Angola; Congo-Brazzaville; Congo-Kinshasa	
Nigeria	Abuja	High Commission	Countries: Benin; Cameroon; Central African Republic; Chad; Equatorial Guinea; Gabon	
Senegal	Dakar	Embassy	Countries: Burkina Faso; Cape Verde; Gambia; Mali	
South Africa	Pretoria	High Commission	Countries: Botswana; Eswatini; Lesotho; Madagascar; Mozambique	
Sudan	Khartoum	Embassy	Countries: Eritrea	
Zimbabwe	Harare	Embassy	Countries: Comoros; Malawi; Mauritius; Seychelles; Zambia	

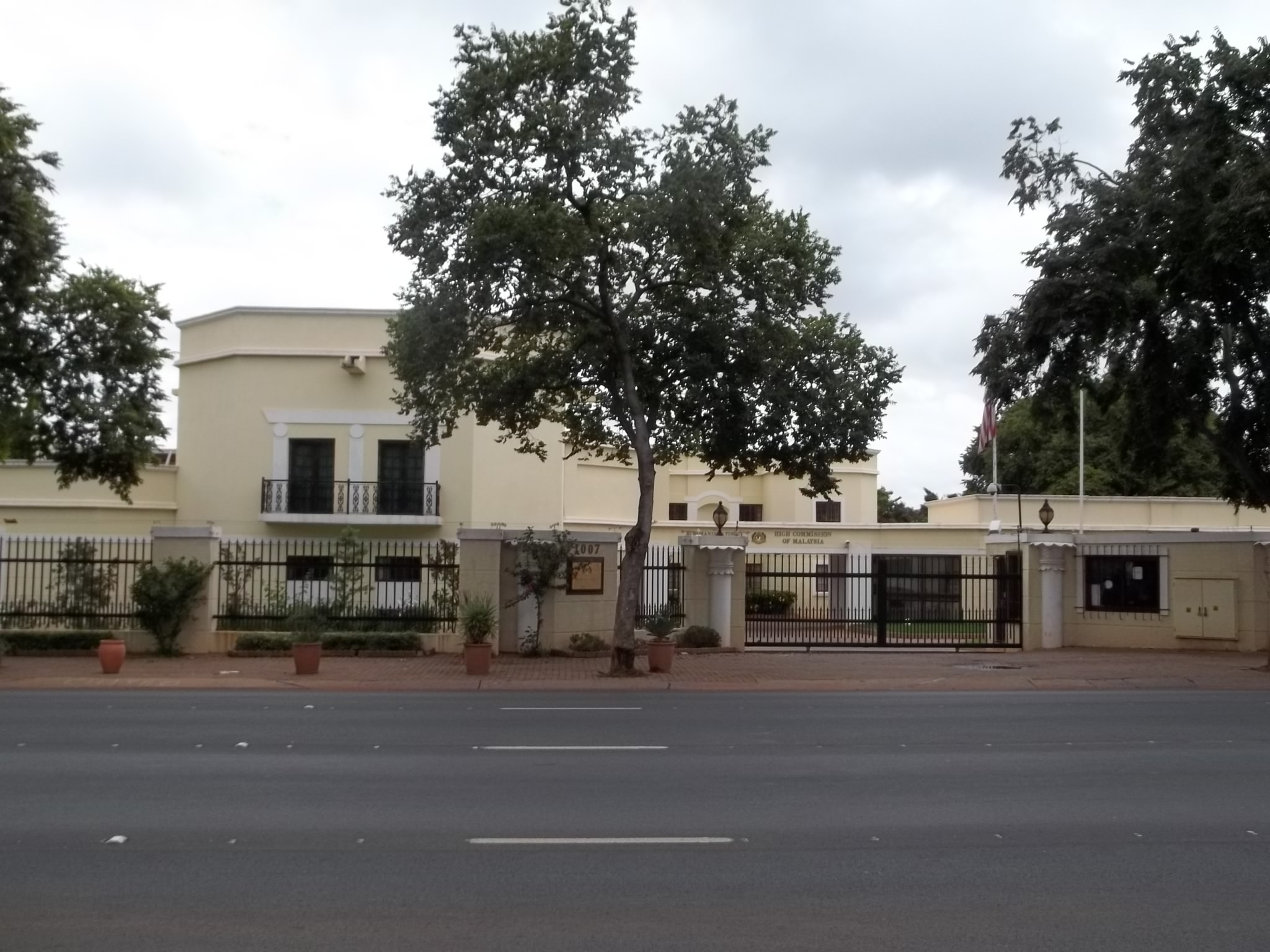
High Commission in Pretoria

=== Americas ===
Host country	Host city	Mission level	Concurrent accreditation	Ref.
Argentina	Buenos Aires	Embassy	Countries: Paraguay; Uruguay	
Brazil	Brasília	Embassy	Countries: Guyana; Suriname	
Canada	Ottawa	High Commission		
Canada	Vancouver	Consulate-General		
Chile	Santiago de Chile	Embassy	Countries: Ecuador	
Cuba	Havana	Embassy	Countries: Bahamas; Dominican Republic; Haiti; Jamaica; Nicaragua	
Mexico	Mexico City	Embassy	Countries: Belize; Costa Rica; El Salvador; Guatemala; Honduras	
Peru	Lima	Embassy	Countries: Bolivia; Colombia; Panama	
United States	Washington, D.C.	Embassy		
United States	Los Angeles	Consulate-General		
United States	New York City	Consulate-General		
Venezuela	Caracas	Embassy	Countries: Antigua and Barbuda; Barbados; Dominica; Grenada; Saint Lucia; Saint Vincent and the Grenadines; Trinidad and Tobago	

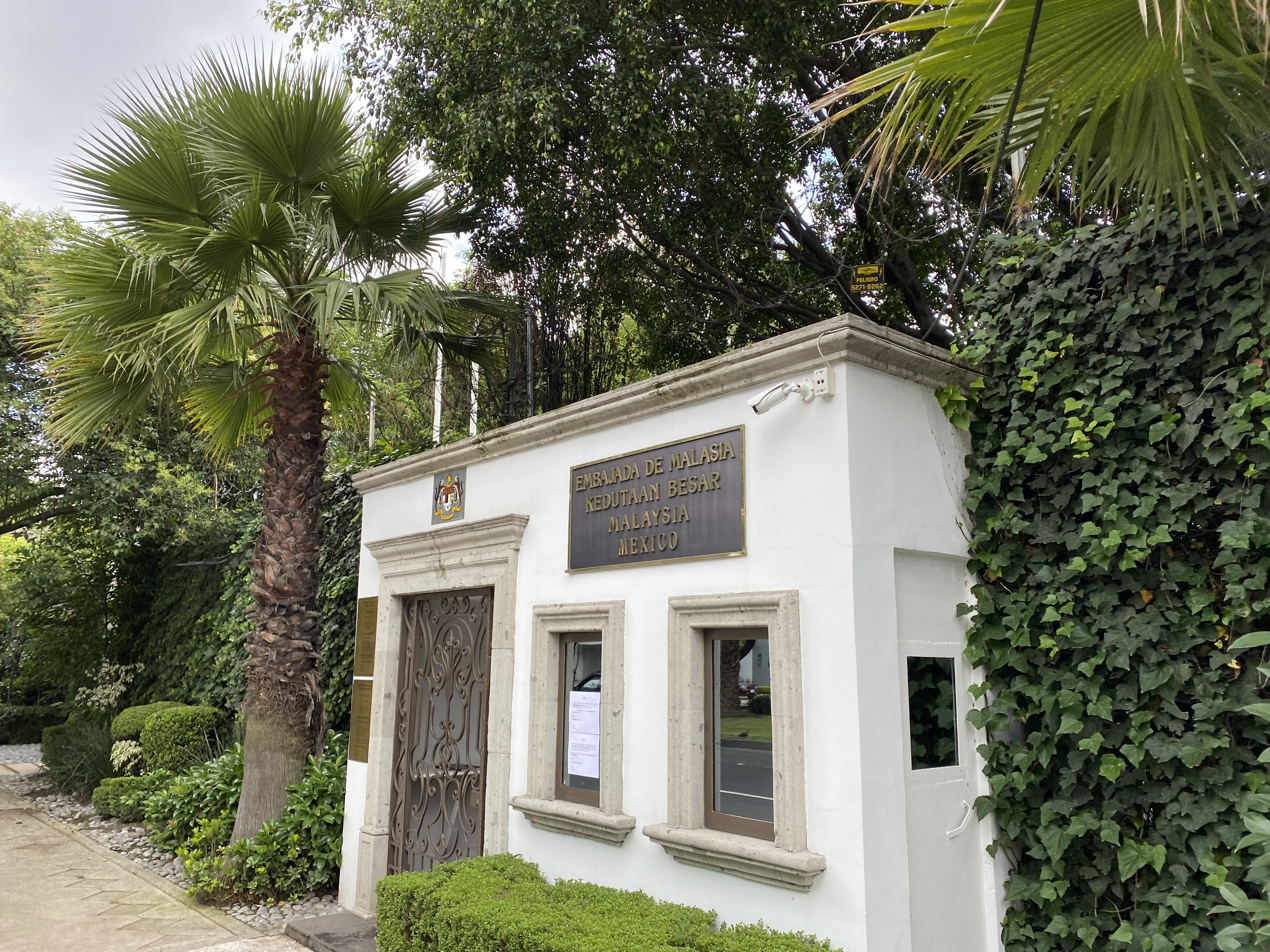
Embassy in Mexico City

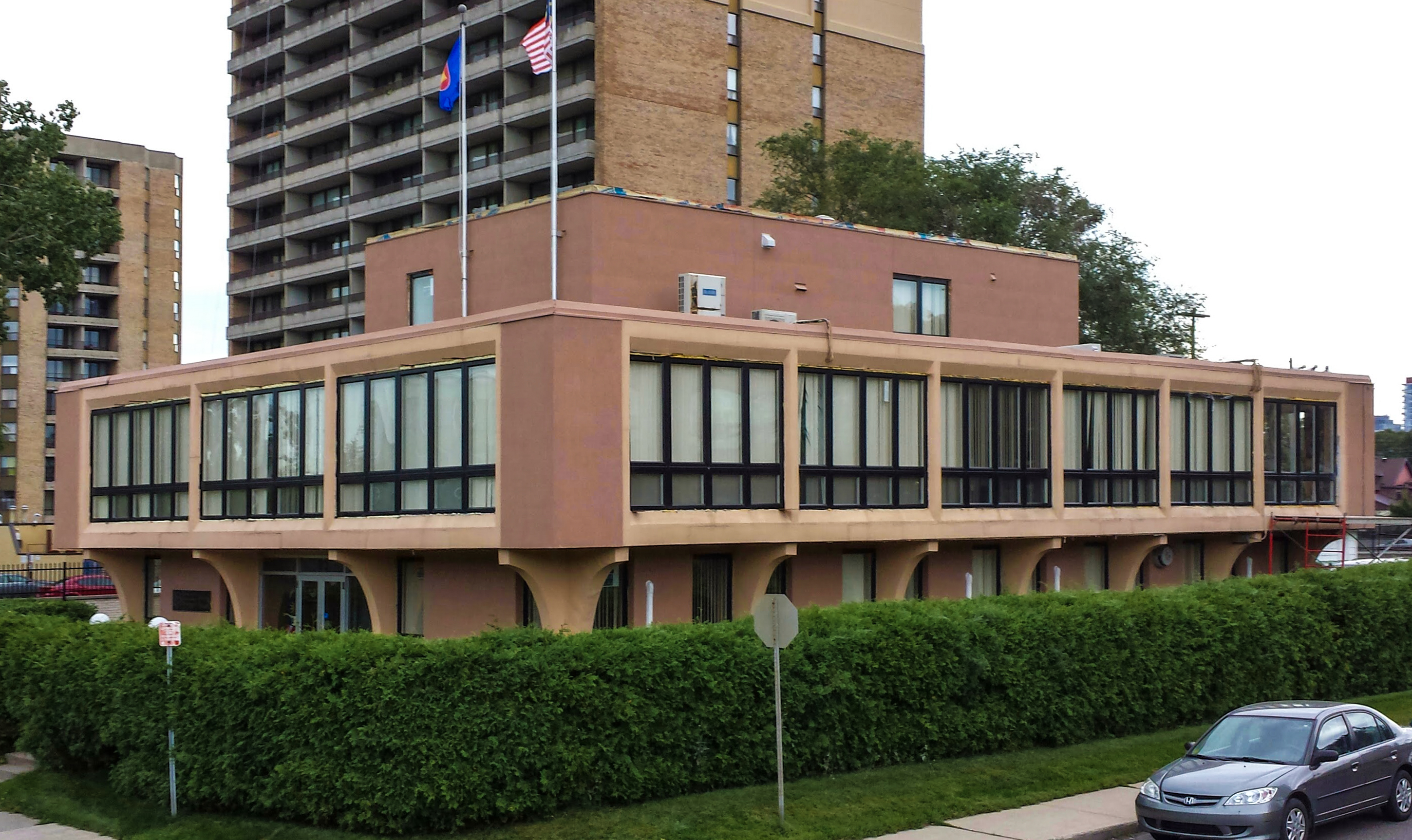
High Commission in Ottawa

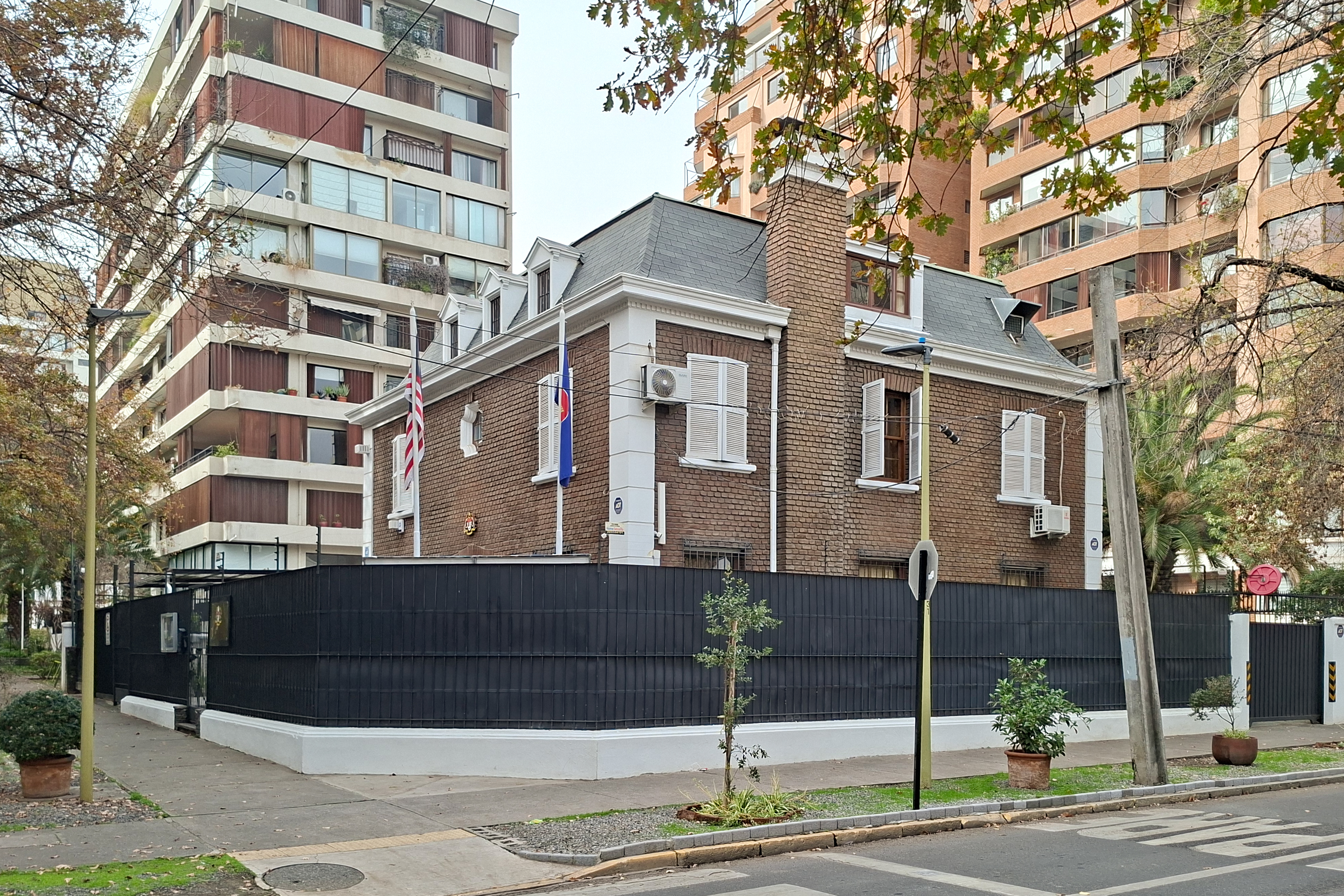
Embassy in Santiago

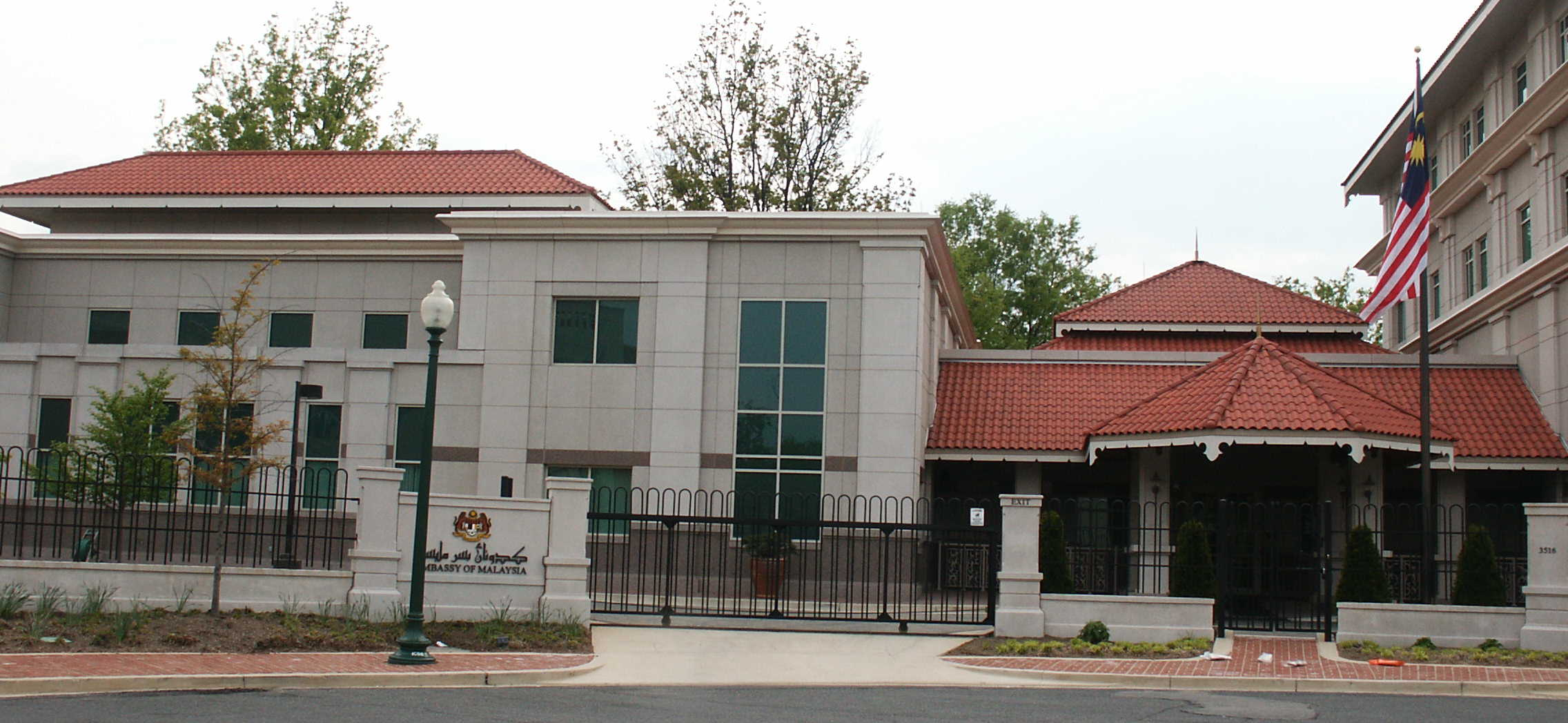
Embassy in Washington, D.C.

=== Asia ===
Host country	Host city	Mission level	Concurrent accreditation	Ref.
Azerbaijan	Baku	Embassy	Countries: Georgia	
Bahrain	Manama	Embassy		
Bangladesh	Dhaka	High Commission		
Brunei	Bandar Seri Begawan	High Commission		
Cambodia	Phnom Penh	Embassy		
China	Beijing	Embassy	Countries: Mongolia	
China	Guangzhou	Consulate-General	Countries: Mongolia	
China	Hong Kong	Consulate-General	Countries: Mongolia	
China	Kunming	Consulate-General	Countries: Mongolia	
China	Nanning	Consulate-General	Countries: Mongolia	
China	Shanghai	Consulate-General	Countries: Mongolia	
China	Xi'an	Consulate-General	Countries: Mongolia	
India	New Delhi	High Commission	Countries: Afghanistan	
India	Chennai	Consulate-General	Countries: Afghanistan	
India	Mumbai	Consulate-General	Countries: Afghanistan	
Indonesia	Jakarta	Embassy		
Indonesia	Medan	Consulate-General		
Indonesia	Pekanbaru	Consulate		
Indonesia	Pontianak	Consulate		
Iran	Tehran	Embassy		
Iraq	Baghdad	Embassy		
Japan	Tokyo	Embassy		
Jordan	Amman	Embassy	Countries: Palestine	
Kazakhstan	Astana	Embassy		
Kuwait	Kuwait City	Embassy		
Laos	Vientiane	Embassy		
Lebanon	Beirut	Embassy	Countries: Cyprus	
Myanmar	Yangon	Embassy		
Nepal	Kathmandu	Embassy		
Oman	Muscat	Embassy		
Pakistan	Islamabad	High Commission		
Pakistan	Karachi	Consulate-General		
Philippines	Manila	Embassy		
Philippines	Davao City	Consulate-General		
Qatar	Doha	Embassy		
Saudi Arabia	Riyadh	Embassy	Multilateral Organizations: Organisation of Islamic Cooperation	
Saudi Arabia	Jeddah	Consulate-General	Multilateral Organizations: Organisation of Islamic Cooperation	
Singapore	Singapore	High Commission		
South Korea	Seoul	Embassy		
Sri Lanka	Colombo	High Commission	Countries: Maldives	
Republic of China (Taiwan) (Note: Malaysia does not have formal relations with Taiwan, since the establishment of relations with the People's Republic of China in 1974. Nonetheless, its trade center in Taipei serves as a de facto embassy.)	Taipei	Trade Centre		
Thailand	Bangkok	Embassy		
Thailand	Songkhla	Consulate-General		
Timor-Leste	Dili	Embassy		
Turkey	Ankara	Embassy		
Turkey	Istanbul	Consulate-General		
Turkmenistan	Ashgabat	Embassy		
United Arab Emirates	Abu Dhabi	Embassy		
United Arab Emirates	Dubai	Consulate-General		
Uzbekistan	Tashkent	Embassy	Countries: Kyrgyzstan; Tajikistan	
Vietnam	Hanoi	Embassy		
Vietnam	Ho Chi Minh City	Consulate-General		

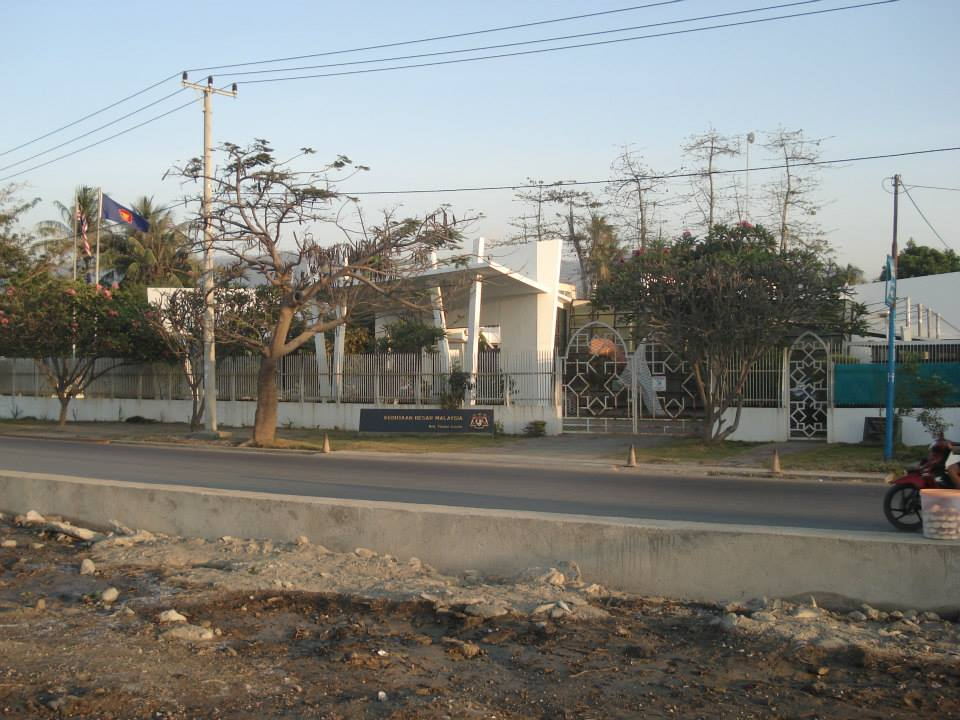
Embassy in Dili

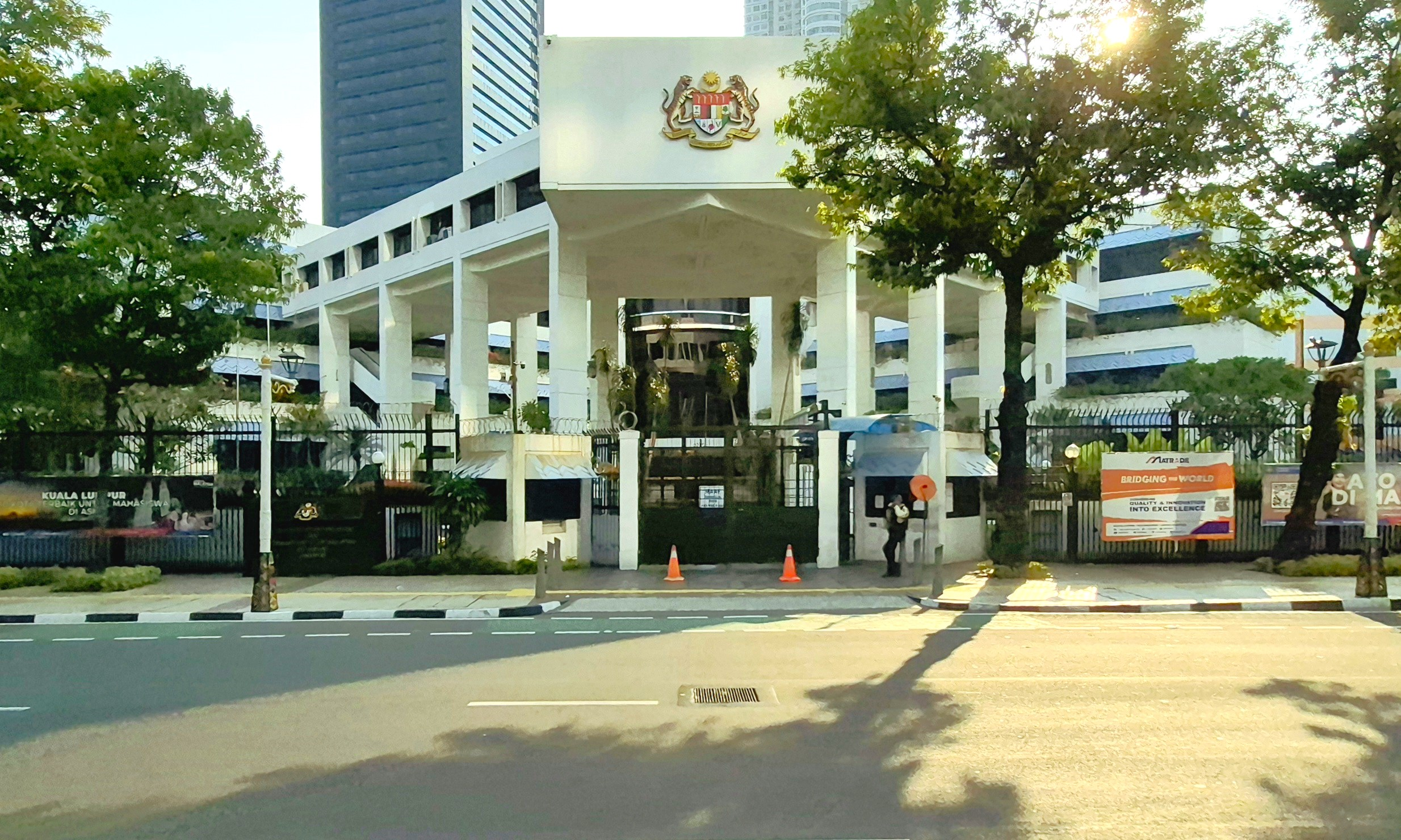
Embassy in Jakarta

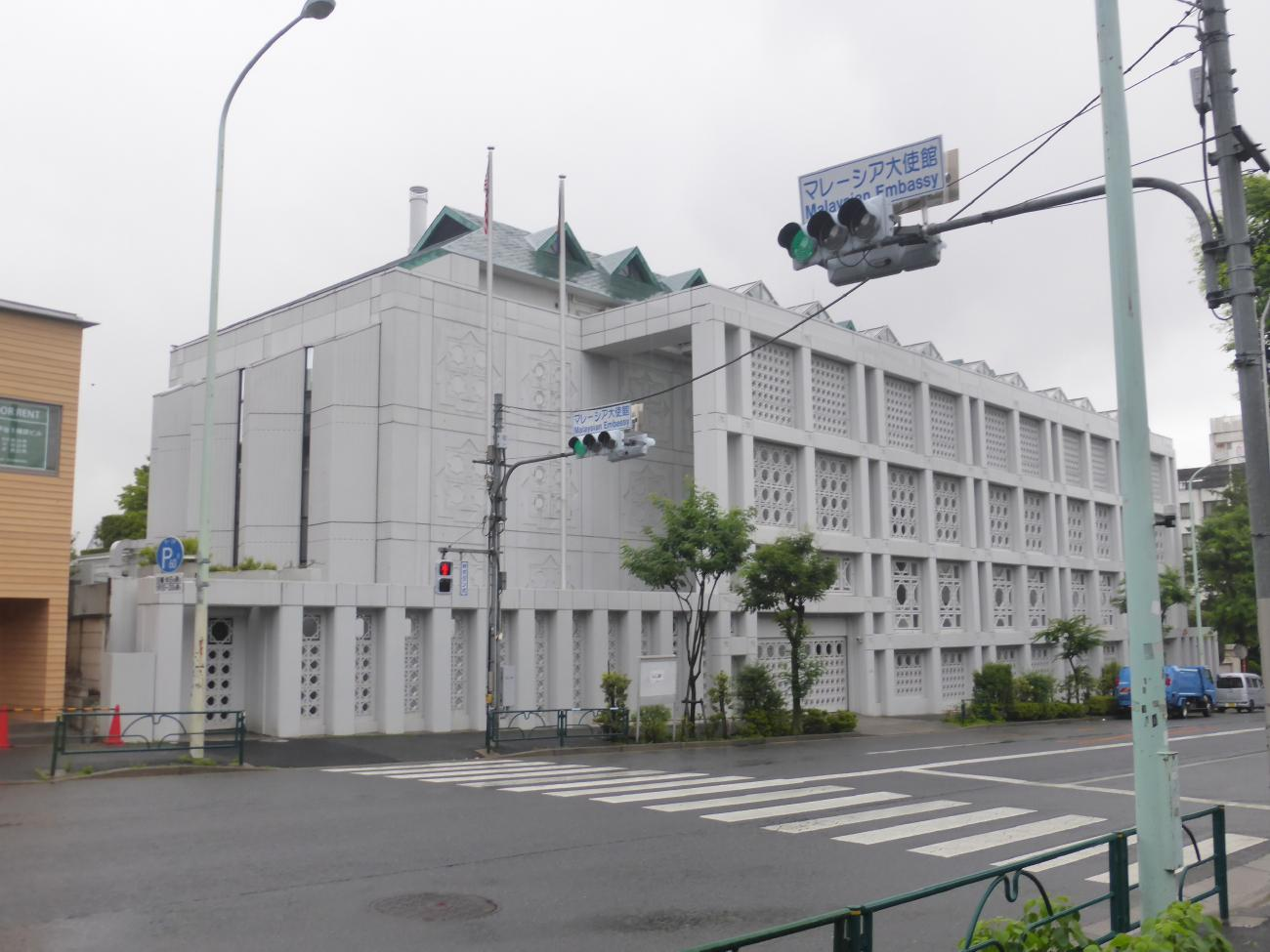
Embassy in Tokyo

=== Europe ===
Host country	Host city	Mission level	Concurrent accreditation	Ref.
Austria	Vienna	Embassy	Countries: Slovakia; Multilateral Organizations: United Nations; International Atomic Energy Agency; UNIDO; UNODC	
Belgium	Brussels	Embassy	Countries: Luxembourg; Multilateral Organizations: European Union	
Bosnia and Herzegovina	Sarajevo	Embassy	Countries: Montenegro	
Croatia	Zagreb	Embassy		
Czechia	Prague	Embassy		
Finland	Helsinki	Embassy	Countries: Estonia; Latvia	
France	Paris	Embassy	Countries: Andorra; Monaco; Portugal	
Germany	Berlin	Embassy		
Germany	Frankfurt	Consulate-General		
Holy See (Note: Embassy of Malaysia to Holy See is located outside Vatican territory, in Rome.)	Rome	Embassy	Countries: Albania; Malta	
Hungary	Budapest	Embassy	Countries: North Macedonia; Slovenia	
Ireland	Dublin	Embassy		
Italy	Rome	Embassy	Countries: Kosovo; San Marino; Multilateral Organizations: Food and Agriculture Organization; International Fund for Agricultural Development; World Food Programme; UNIDROIT	
Netherlands	The Hague	Embassy	Multilateral Organizations: Organisation for the Prohibition of Chemical Weapons	
Poland	Warsaw	Embassy	Countries: Lithuania	
Romania	Bucharest	Embassy	Countries: Bulgaria; Greece; Moldova	
Russia	Moscow	Embassy	Countries: Armenia; Belarus	
Serbia	Belgrade	Embassy		
Spain	Madrid	Embassy		
Sweden	Stockholm	Embassy	Countries: Denmark; Iceland; Norway	
Switzerland	Bern	Embassy	Countries: Liechtenstein	
Ukraine	Kyiv	Embassy		
United Kingdom	London	High Commission	Multilateral Organizations: International Maritime Organization	

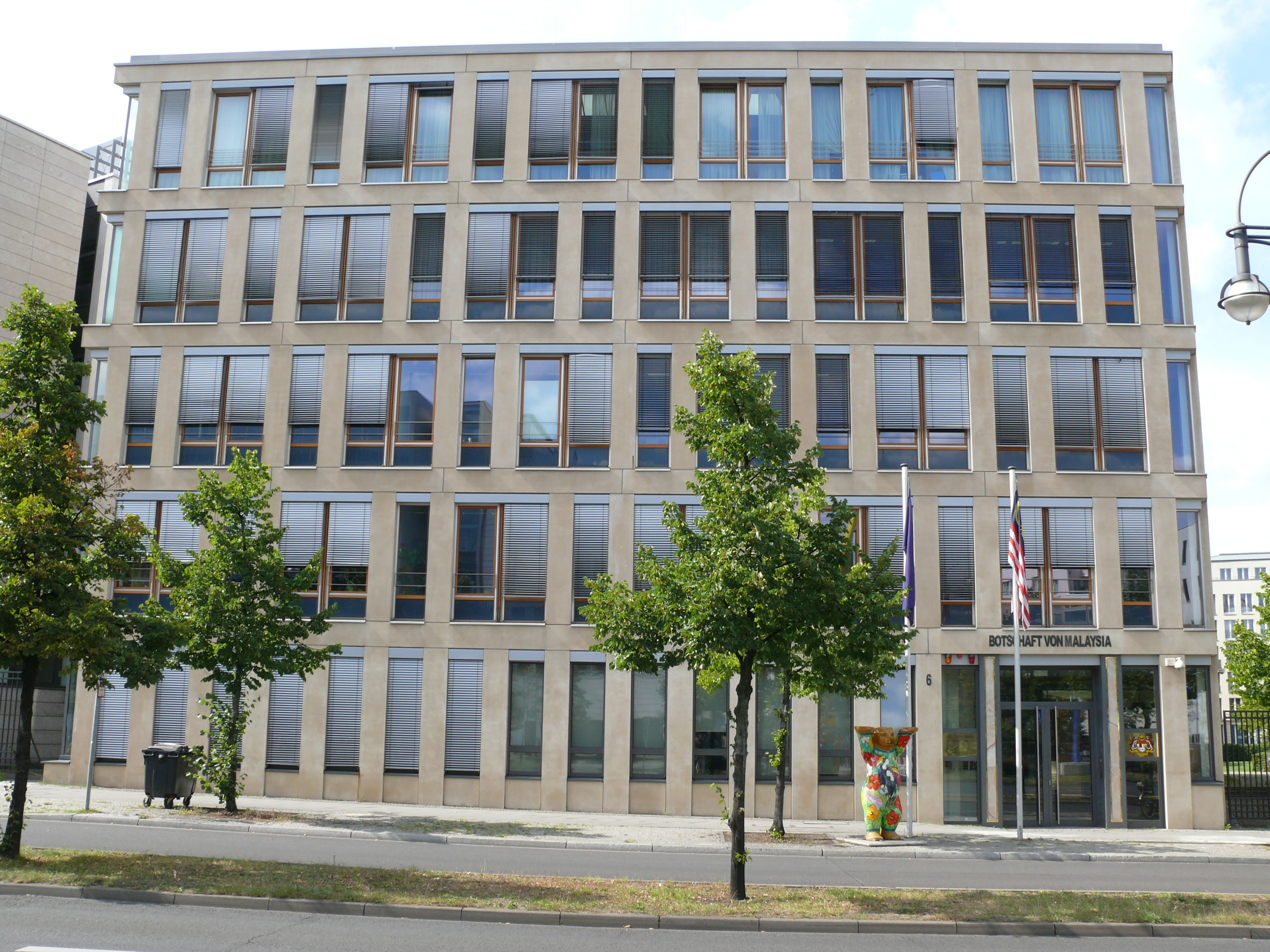
Embassy in Berlin

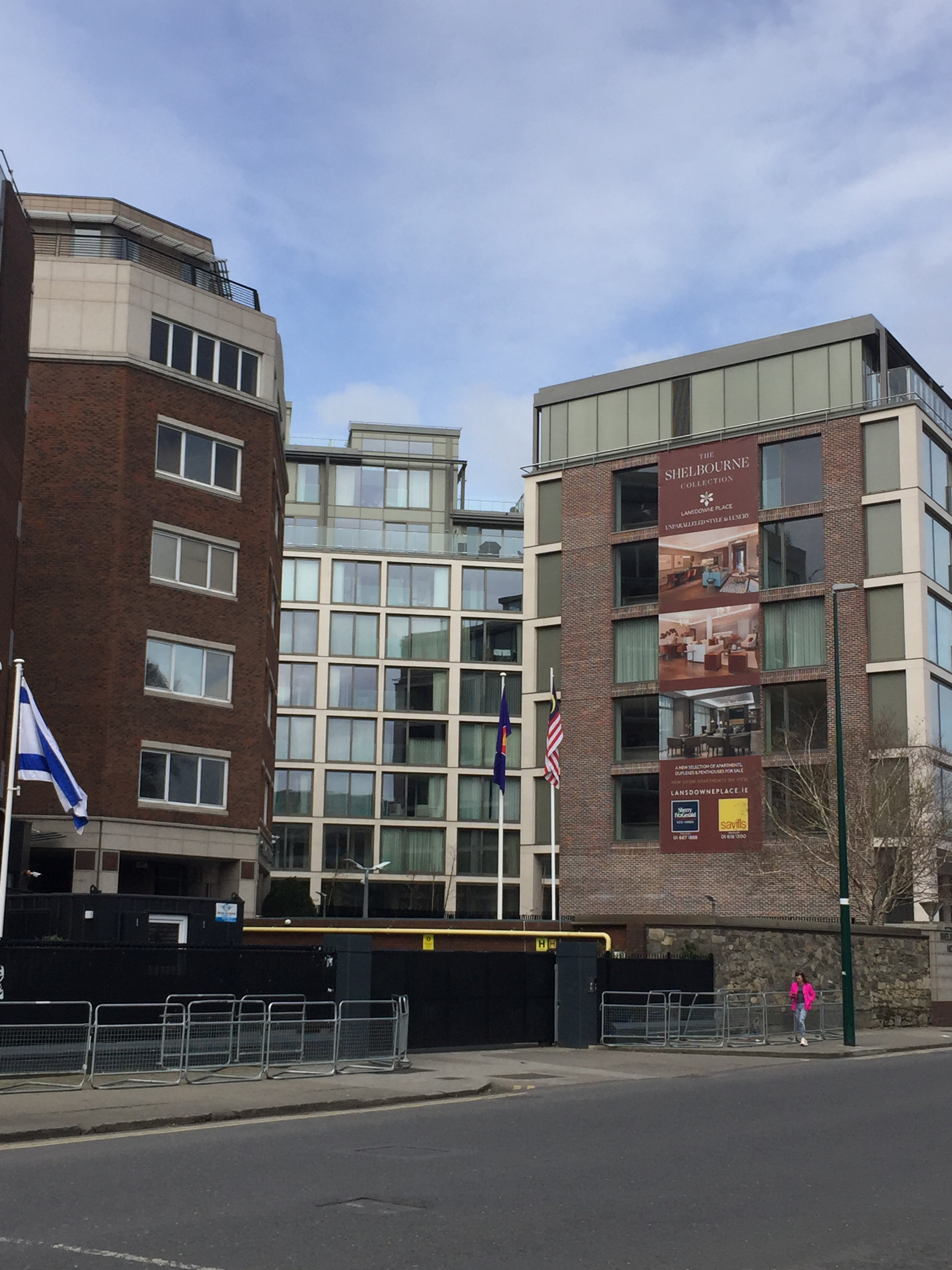
Embassy in Dublin

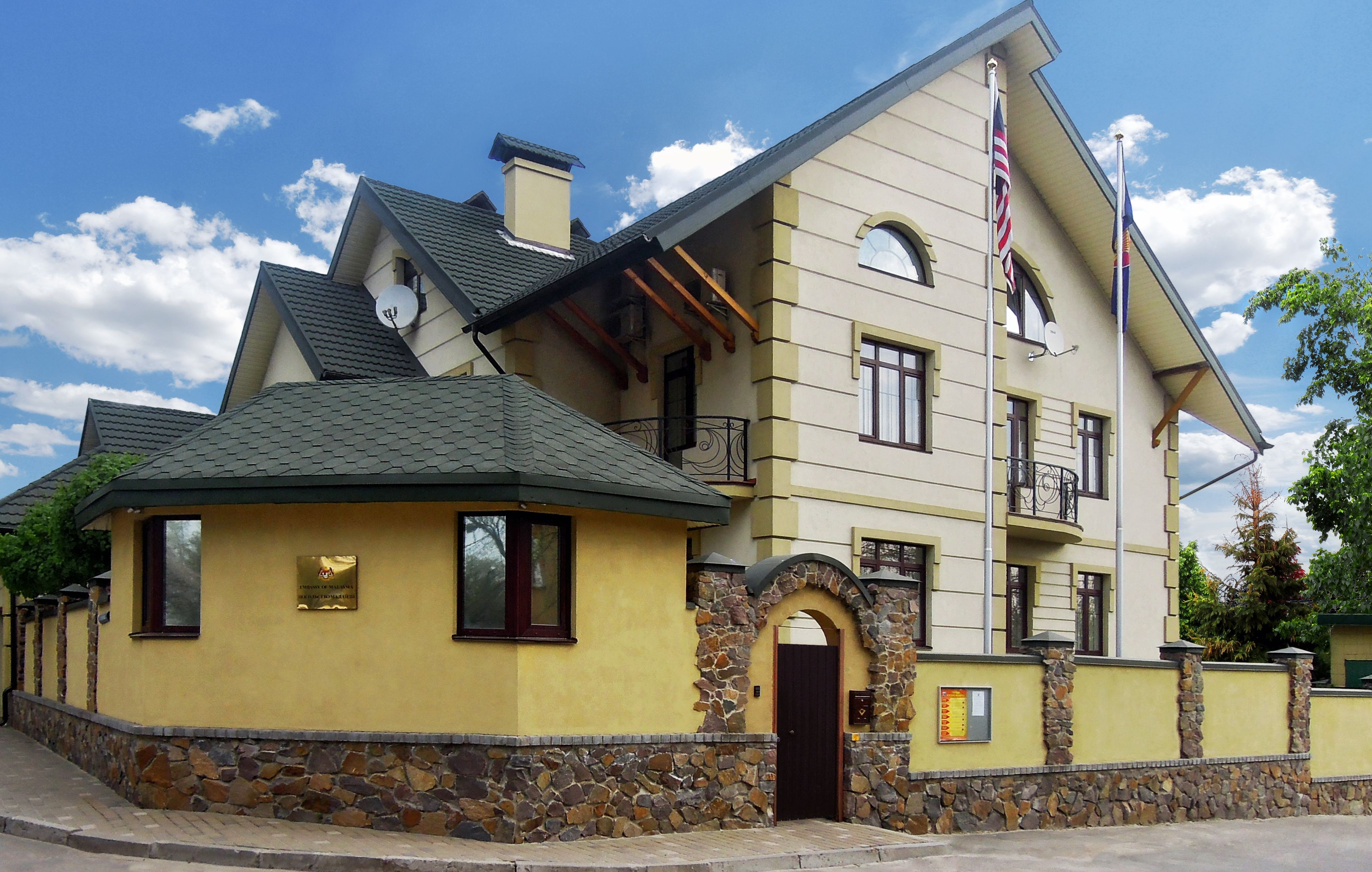
Embassy in Kyiv

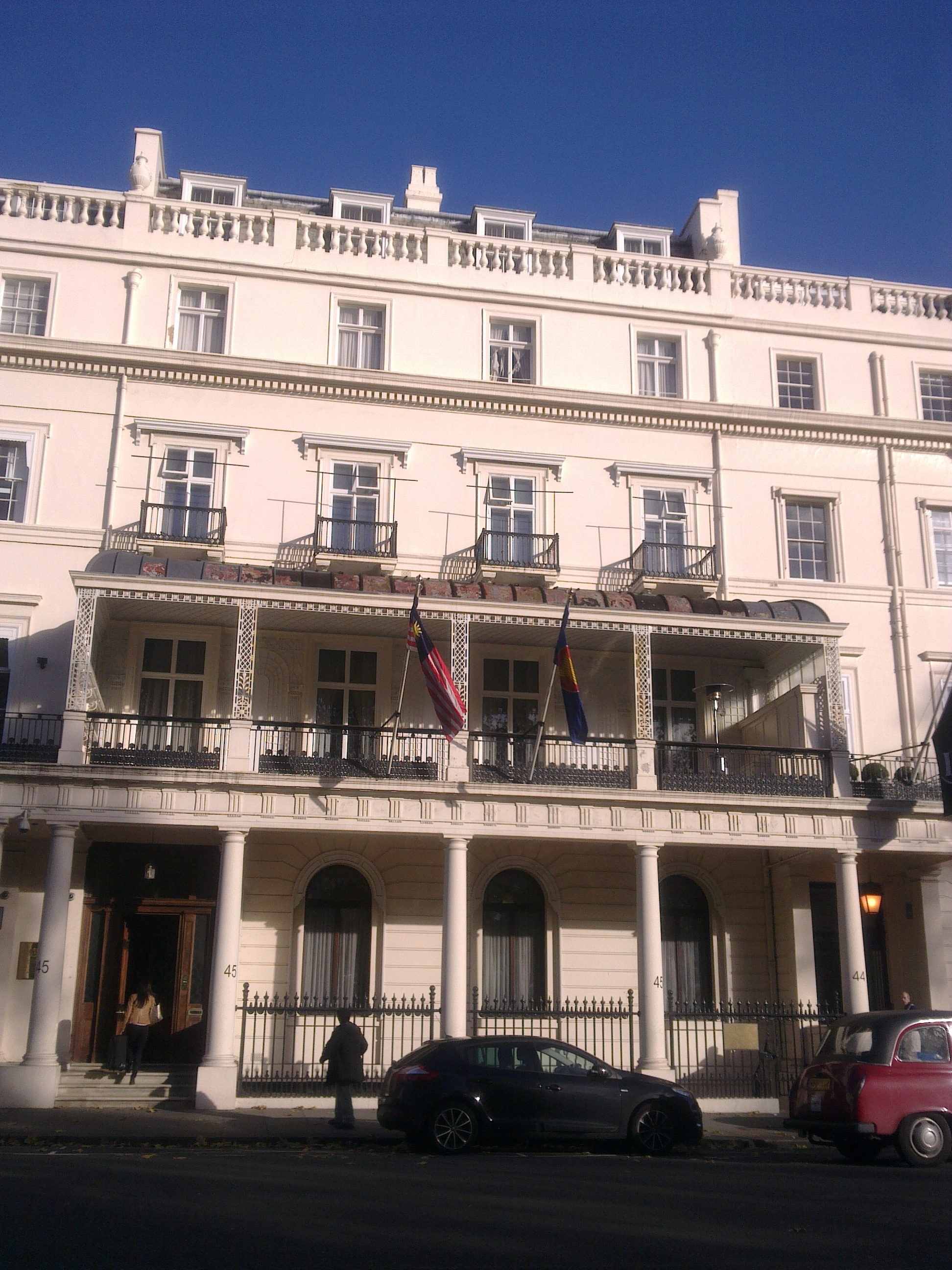
High Commission in London

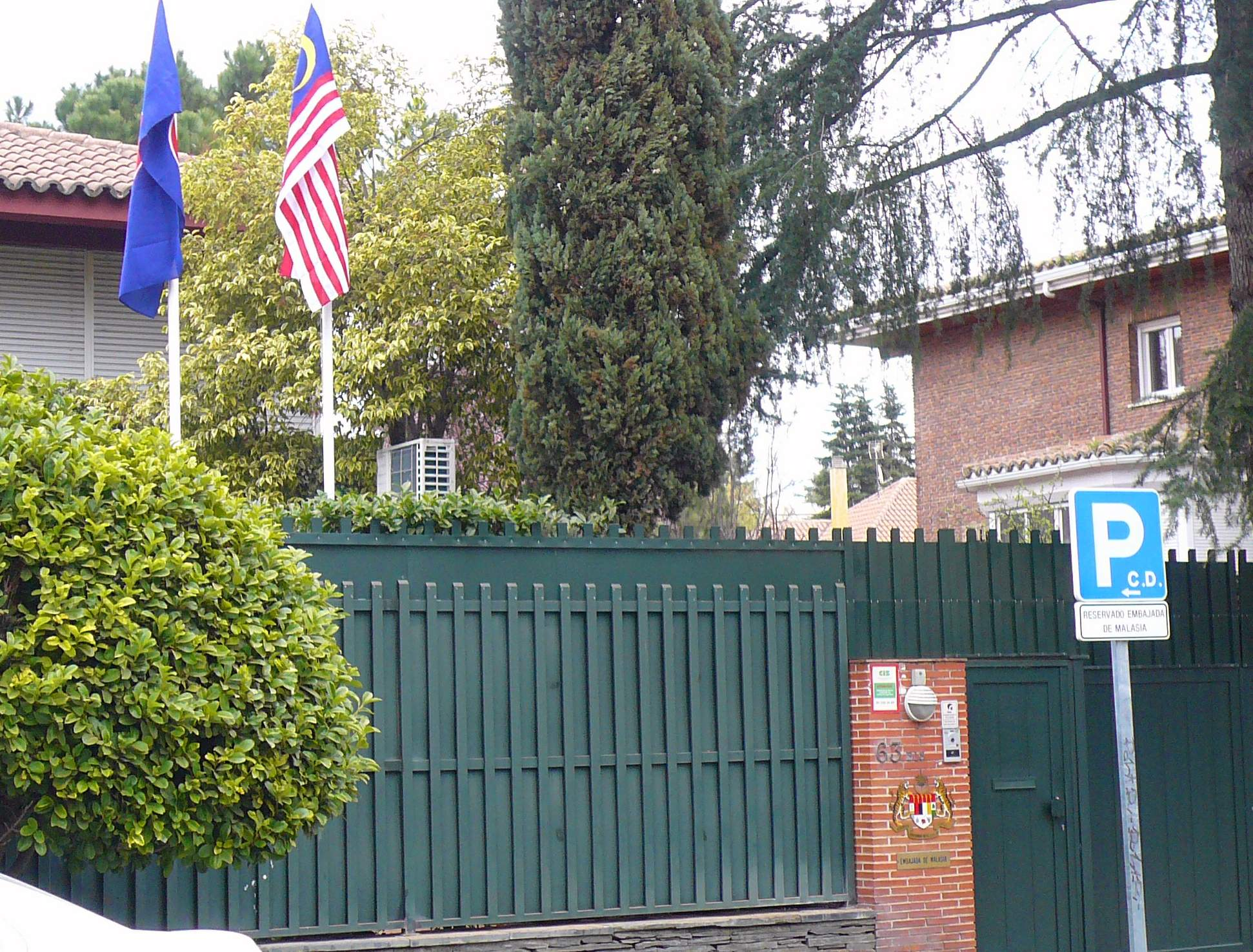
Embassy in Madrid

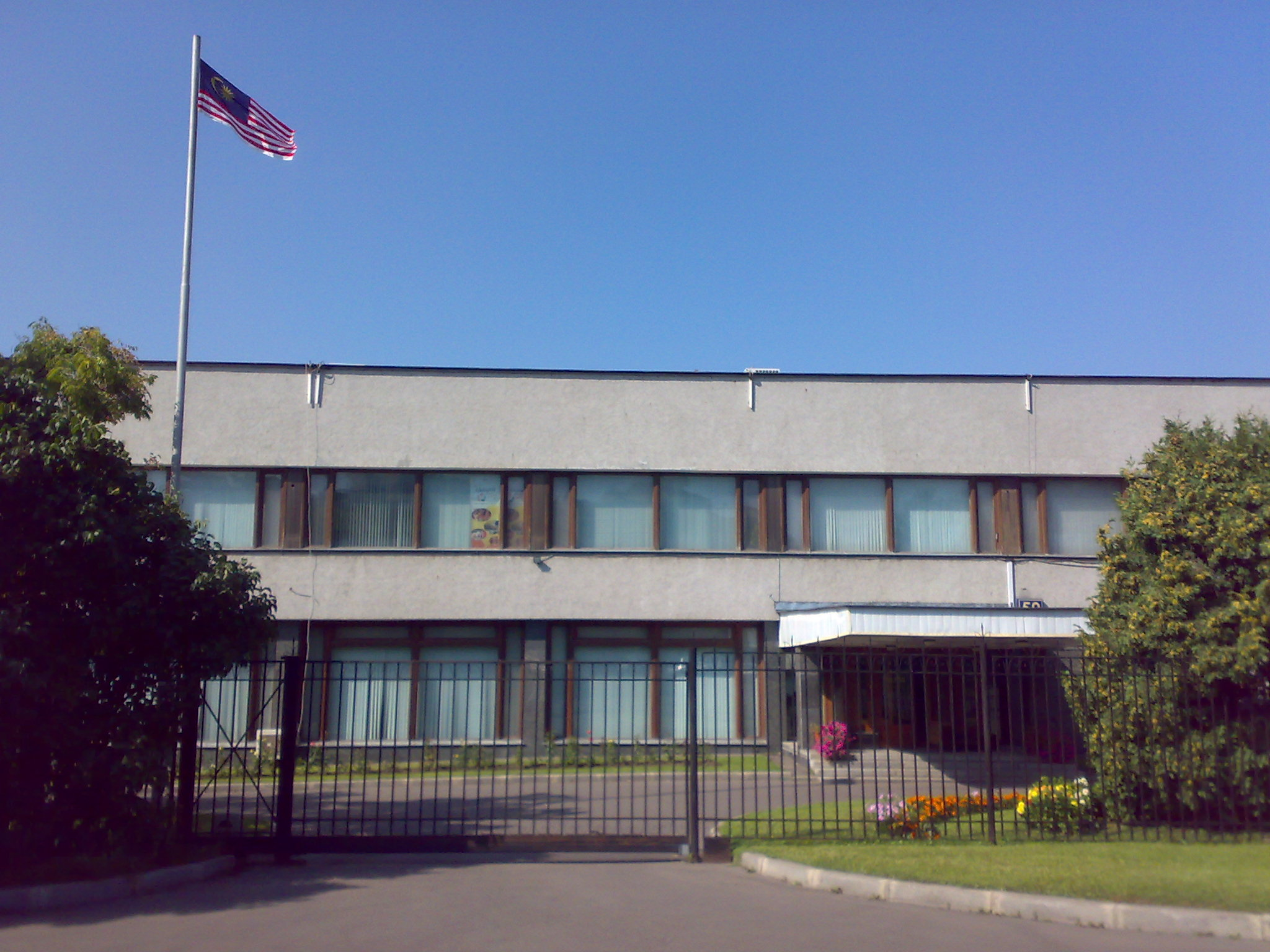
Embassy in Moscow

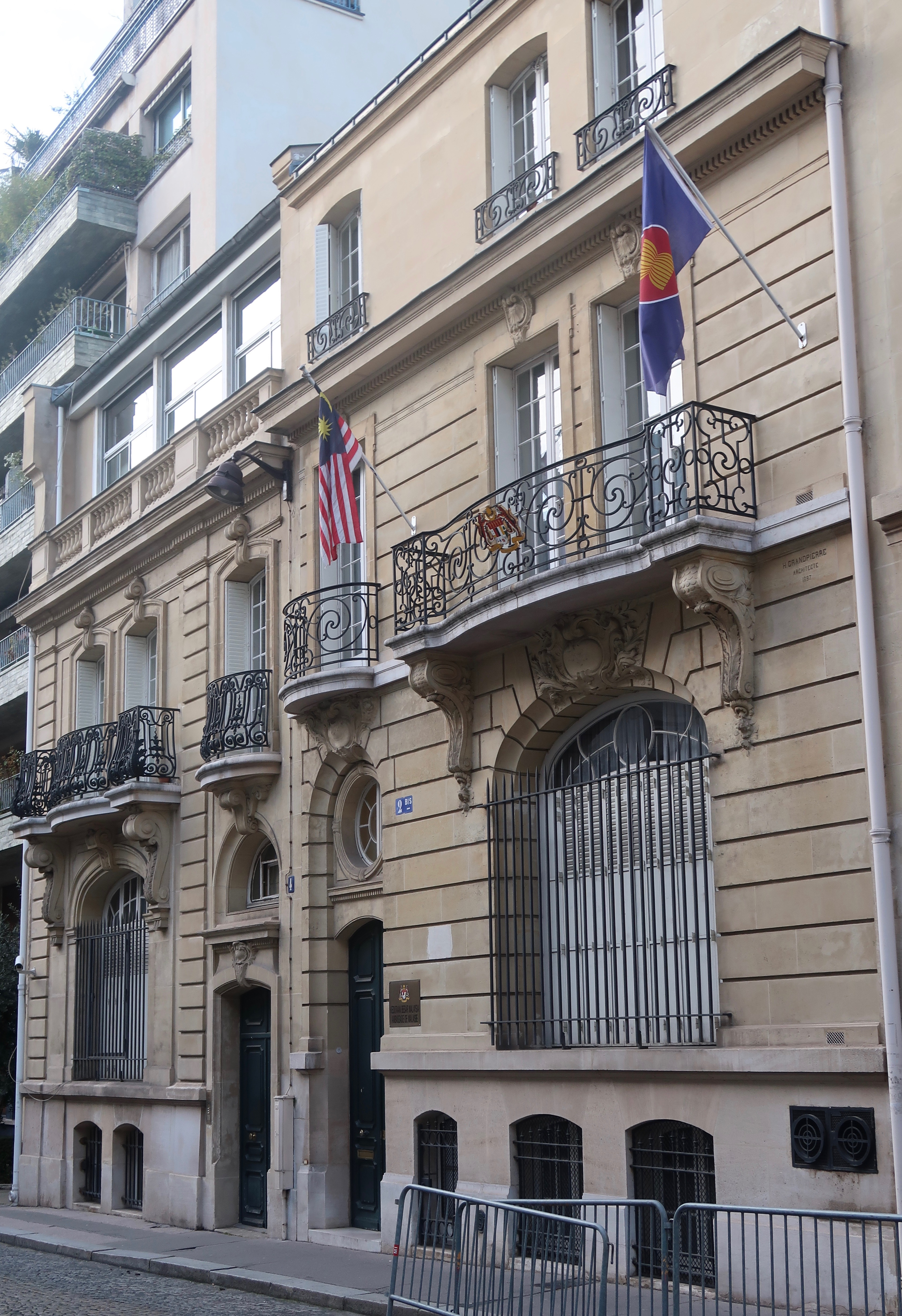
Embassy in Paris

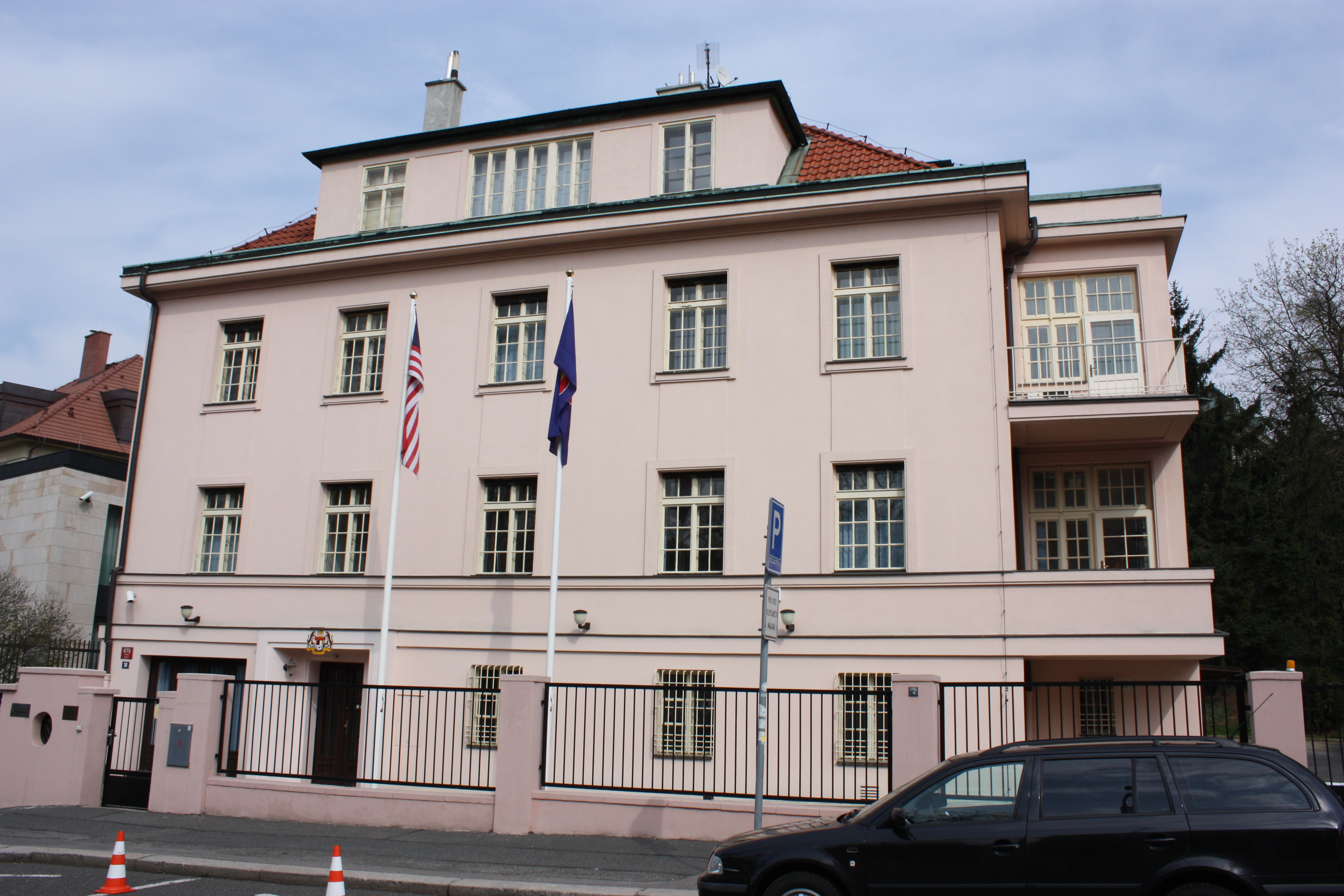
Embassy in Prague

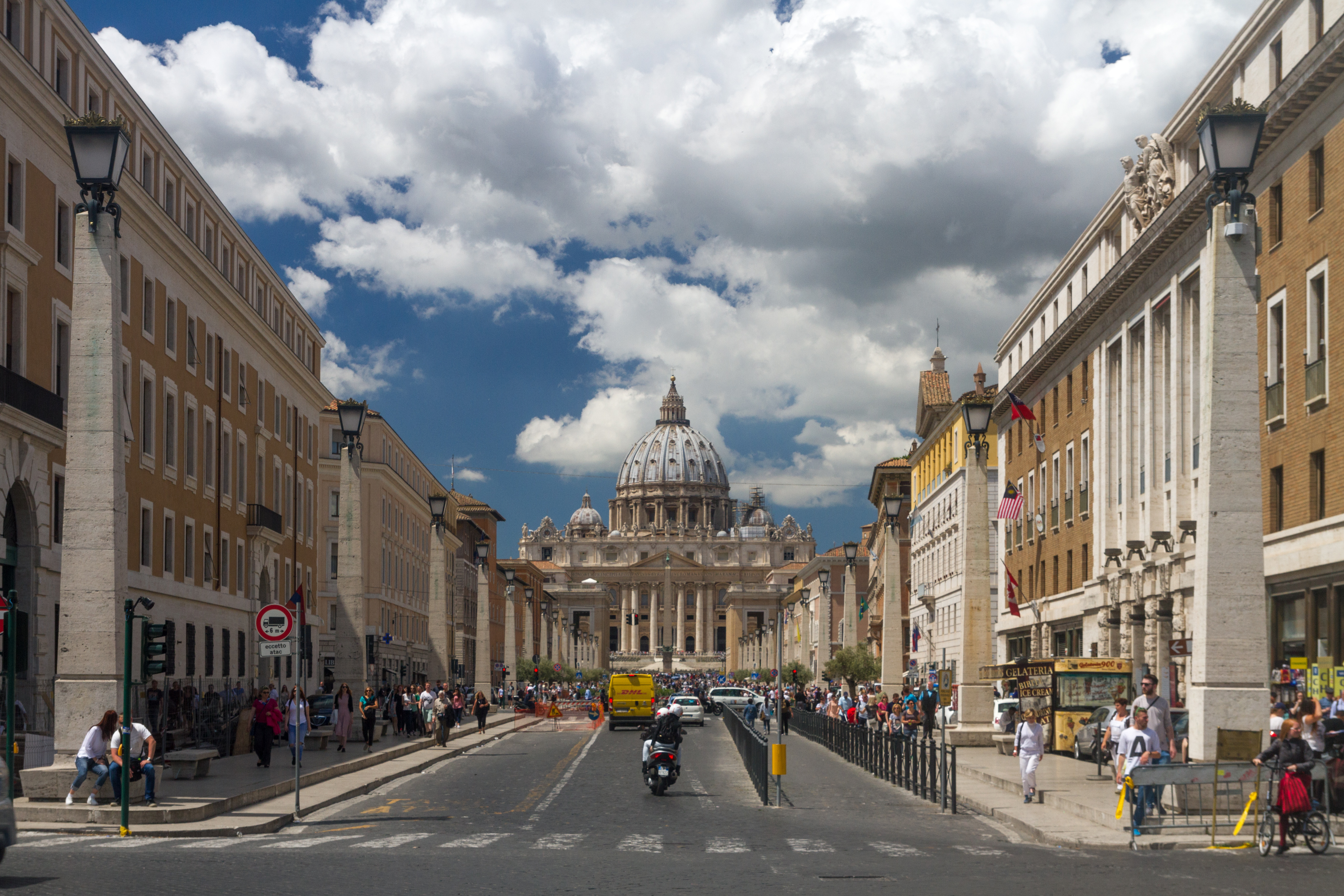
Embassy to the Holy See in Rome

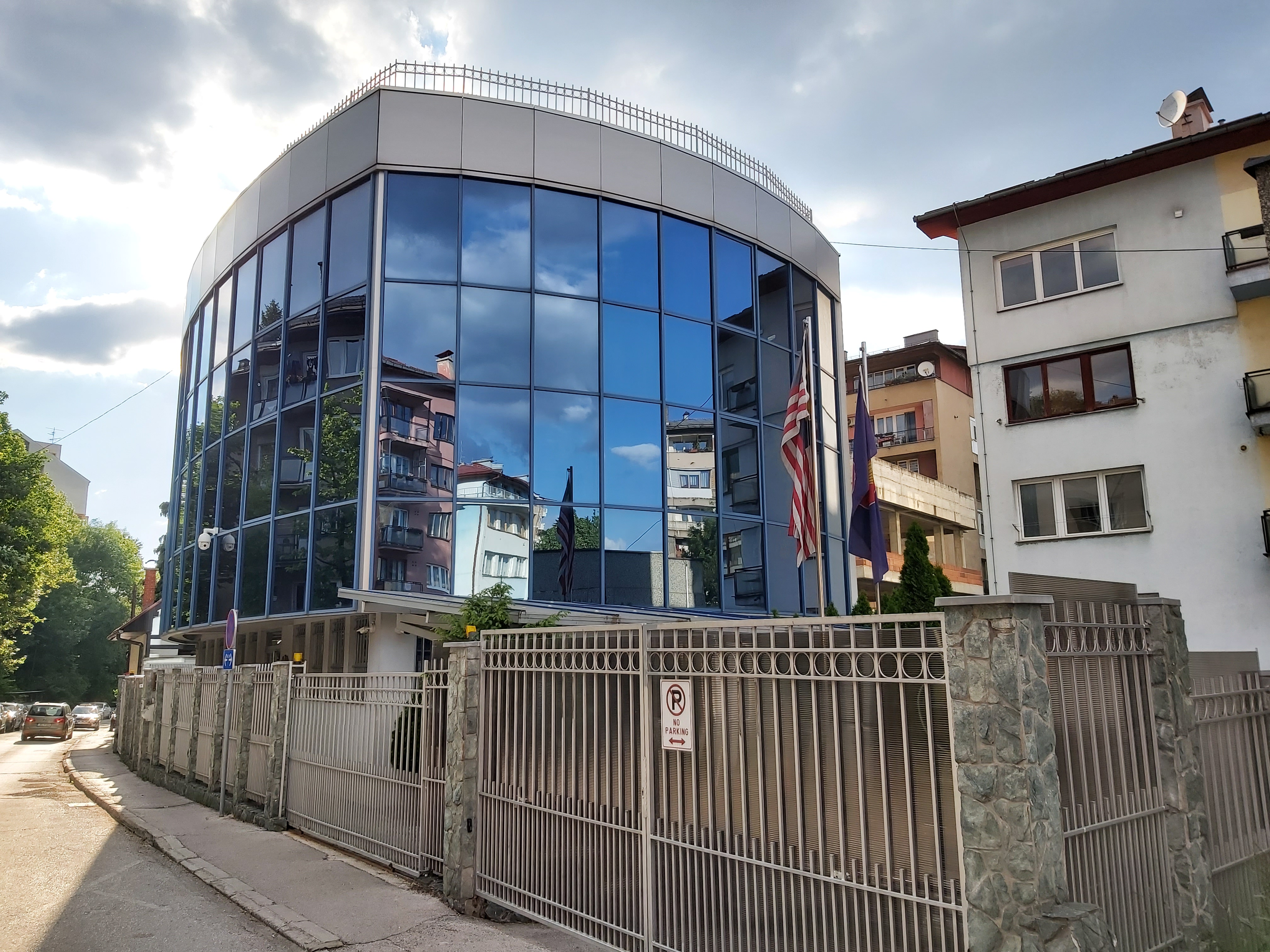
Embassy in Sarajevo

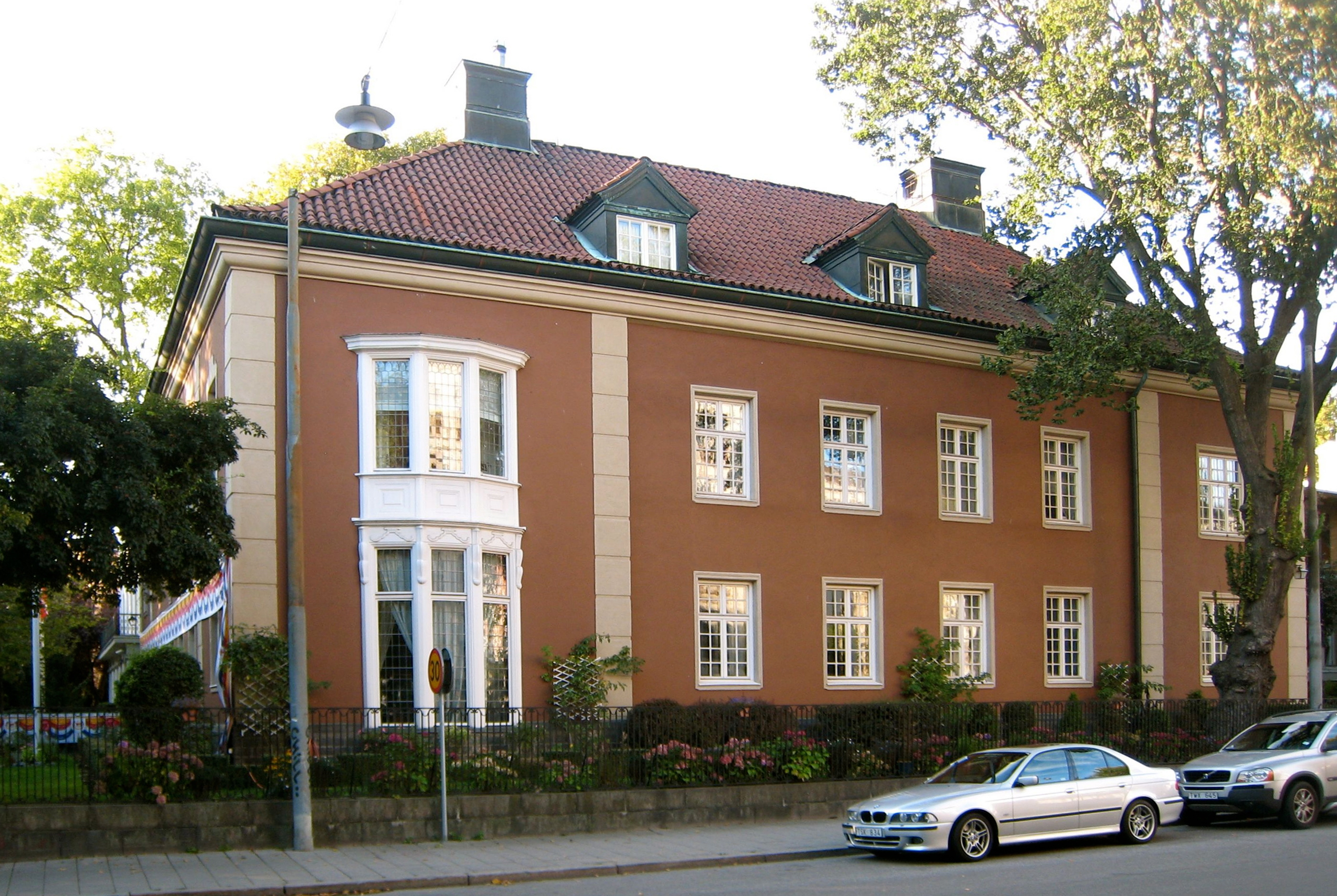
Embassy in Stockholm

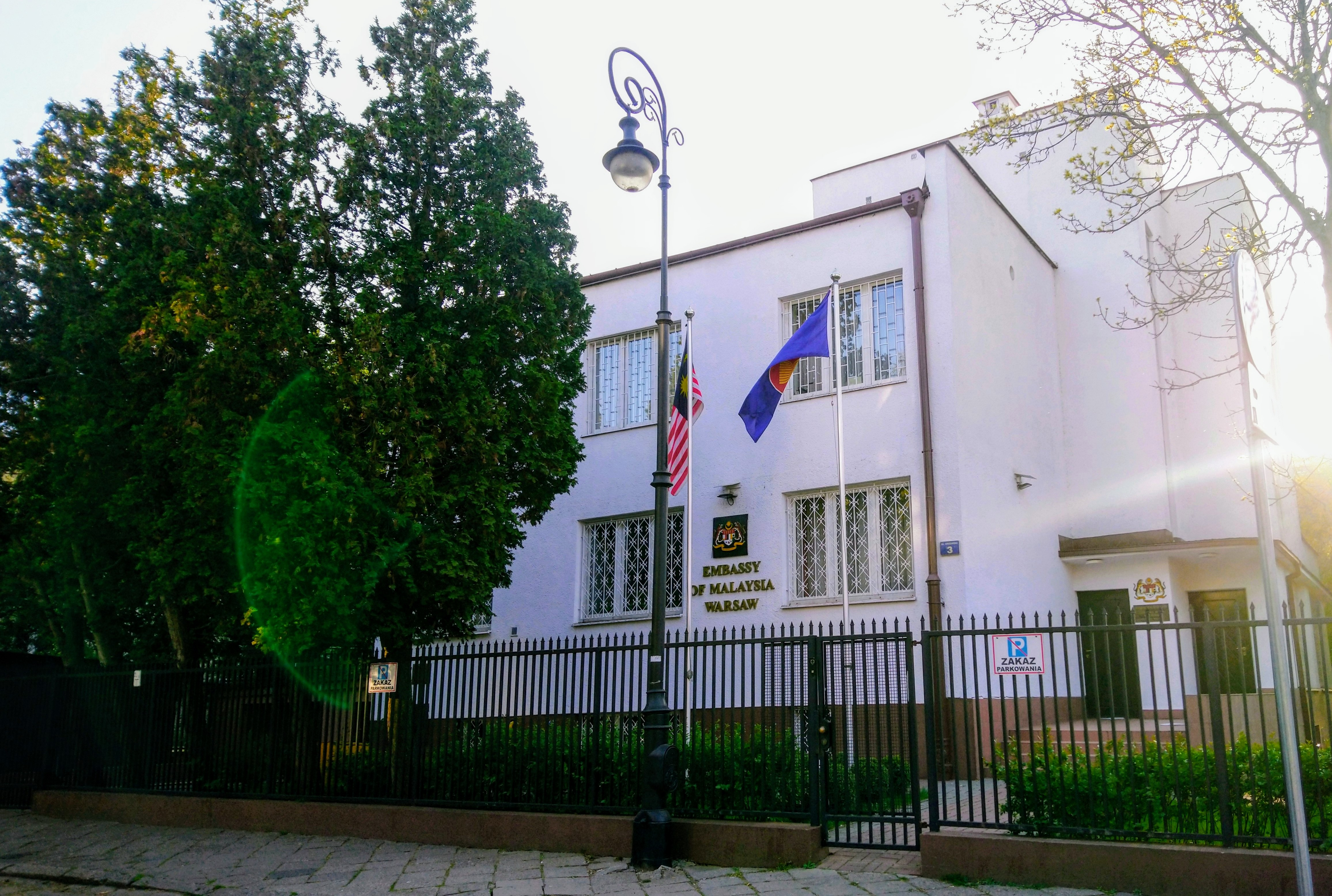
Embassy in Warsaw

=== Oceania ===
Host country	Host city	Mission level	Concurrent accreditation	Ref.
Australia	Canberra	High Commission		
Australia	Melbourne	Consulate General		
Australia	Perth	Consulate General		
Australia	Sydney	Consulate General		
Fiji	Suva	High Commission	Countries: Kiribati; Nauru; Tonga; Tuvalu	
New Zealand	Wellington	High Commission	Countries: Cook Islands; Niue; Samoa	
Papua New Guinea	Port Moresby	High Commission	Countries: Solomon Islands; Vanuatu	

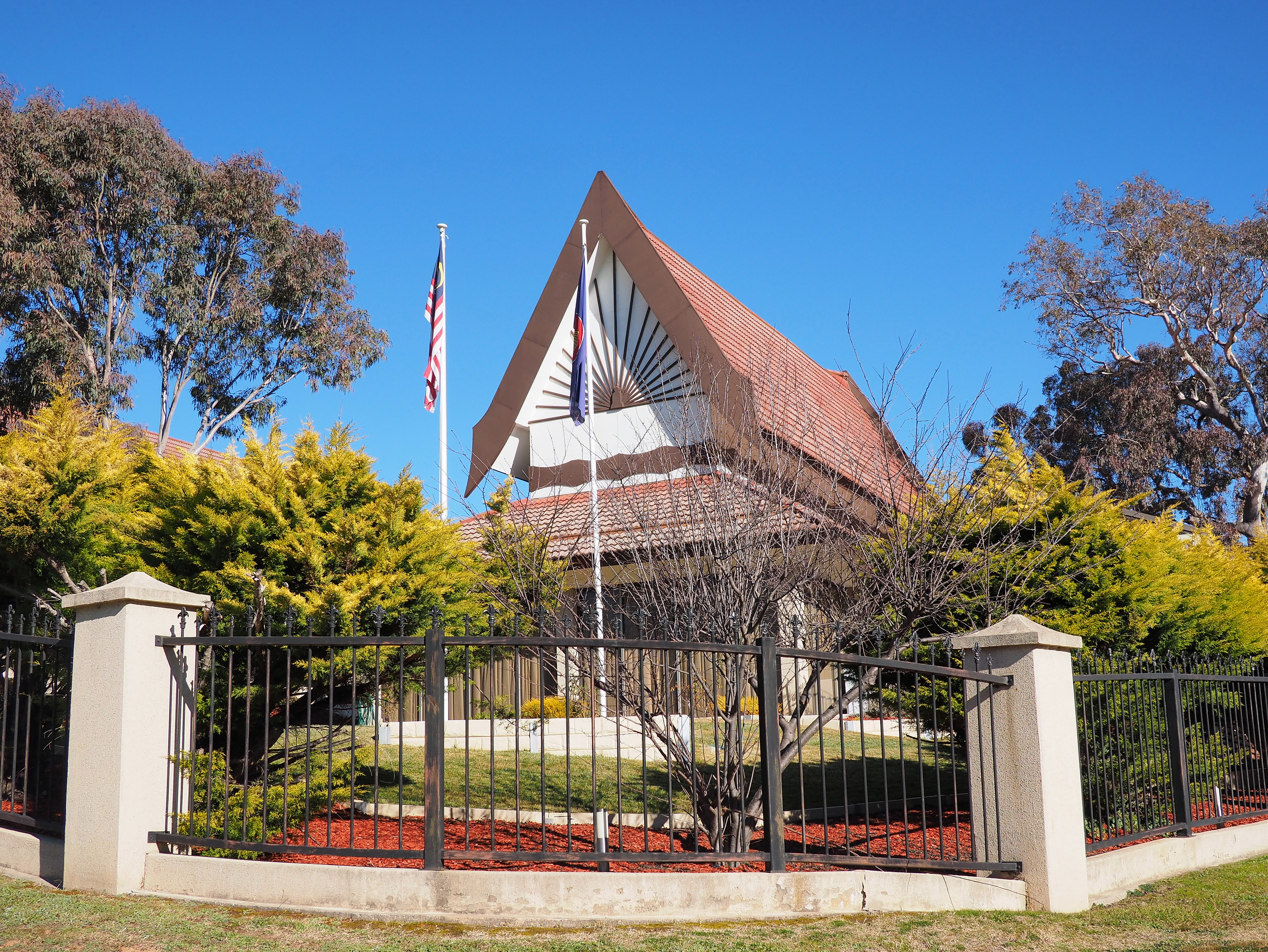
High Commission in Canberra

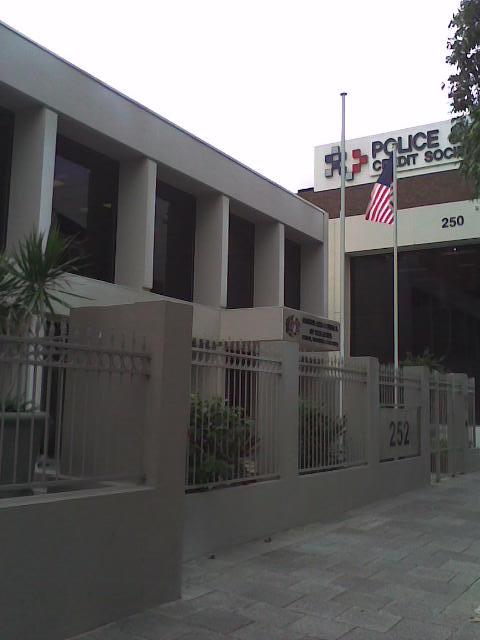
Consulate in Perth

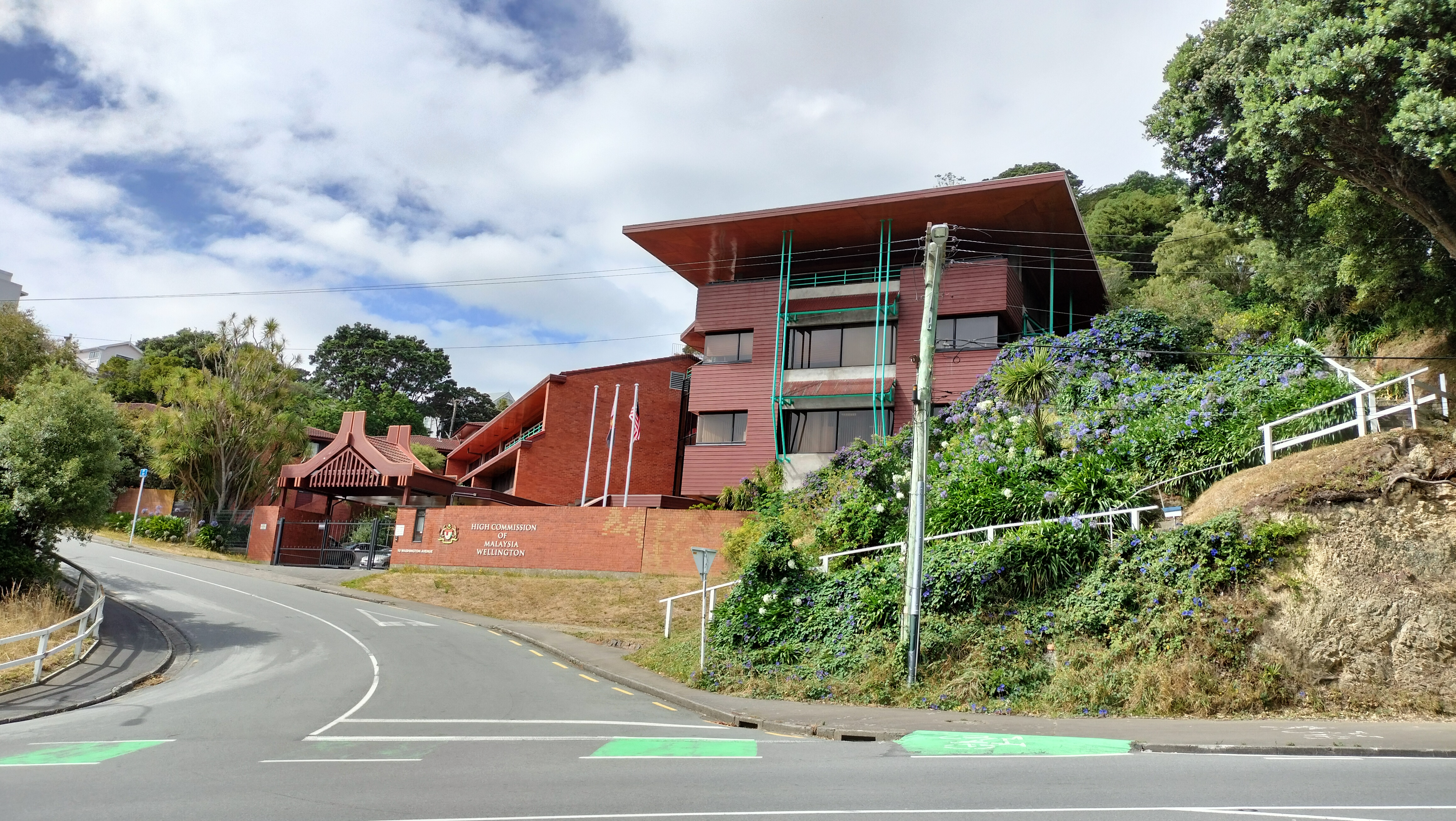
High Commission in Wellington

=== Multilateral organisations ===
Organization	Host city	Host country	Mission type	Concurrent accreditation	Ref.
ASEAN	Jakarta	Indonesia	Permanent Mission		
United Nations	New York City	United States	Permanent Mission		
United Nations	Geneva	Switzerland	Permanent Mission	Multilateral Organizations: World Trade Organization	
UNESCO	Paris	France	Permanent Mission		

== Closed missions ==
=== Africa ===
Host country	Host city	Mission level	Year closed	Ref.
Libya	Tripoli	Embassy	2014	

=== Asia ===
Host country	Host city	Mission	Year closed	Ref.
North Korea	Pyongyang	Embassy	2021	
South Vietnam (Note: The Malaysian embassy was shut down in the midst of the fall of Saigon in April 1975, thus marking the end of the Vietnam War and the start of a transition period to the formal reunification of Vietnam. More information is available on the article on Malaysia-Vietnam relations.)	Saigon	Embassy (Note: Continues as a consulate-general nowadays.)	1975	
Syria	Damascus	Embassy	2012	
Yemen	Sana'a	Embassy	2014	

== See also ==
- Foreign relations of Malaysia
- List of ambassadors and high commissioners of Malaysia
- List of diplomatic missions in Malaysia
- Visa policy of Malaysia
- Visa requirements for Malaysian citizens
