= Alwarpet =

- Neighbourhood
- Location within Chennai Location within Tamil Nadu Location within India
- Coordinates: 13.0339°N 80.2486°E
- Country: India
- State: Tamil Nadu
- District: Chennai
- Metro: Chennai
- Zone: Teynampet Zone
- Ward: Alwarpet

Languages
  - Official: Tamil
- Time zone: UTC+5:30 (IST)
- PIN: 600 018
- Vehicle registration: TN-06
- Lok Sabha constituency: Chennai South

Alwarpet is a residential zone in central Chennai and is a part of the greater Teynampet region. It is surrounded by Teynampet in the north and west, Mylapore, Mandavelli and Abhiramapuram in the east, Raja Annamalaipuram in the south, and Nandanam in the southwest. It is among the most upscale neighbourhoods in Chennai. The geographical location of this area allows centralized access to all parts of the city, so it is typically called as "Heart of Chennai". The Central Railway station is about 7 km (4.3 mi) and Chennai International Airport is around 11 km (6.8 mi). The nearest Metro station is Teynampet metro station. A new exclusive station for Alwarpet has been proposed under Phase II of the Chennai Metro Rail Project which is likely to begin by March 2021 and expected to be completed within 5–7 years.

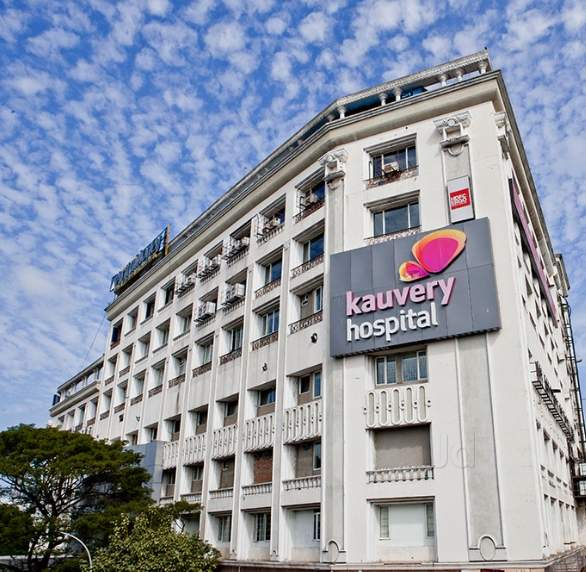
Kauvery Hospital in the neighbourhood

Alwarpet was once home to the actor Kamal Haasan, which he acknowledged in his song "Alwarpetai Aandava" from the movie Vasool Raja MBBS. Chennai Super Kings owner and India Cements Managing Director, N. Srinivasan resides in Boat Club too. This residential area is situated just adjacent to Poes Garden, which is home to two of the most important personalities of Chennai, actor Rajinikanth and the late Chief Minister of Tamil Nadu J. Jayalalithaa. The Boat Club Road adjoining Alwarpet and Raja Annamalaipuram is the third most expensive locality in India and the most expensive in South India.
