= Chennai–Vladivostok Maritime Corridor =

Proposed sea trade route

Chennai–Vladivostok Maritime Corridor (CVMC)
- Chennai-Vladivostok Maritime Corridor between India and Russia via South China Sea
- Length: 5,600 nmi (10,400 km; 6,400 mi)

Major junctions
- North end: Vladivostok, Russian Federation
- South end: Chennai, India

Location
- Countries: India; Russia

Highway system

Chennai–Vladivostok Maritime Corridor (the Eastern Maritime Corridor or EMC) is a sea route covering approximately 5,600 nautical miles, or about 10,300 km, aimed at increasing bilateral trade between India and Russia. In September 2019, in Vladivostok, Prime Minister Narendra Modi signed a Memorandum of Intent for the route.

== Background ==
The current route from Mumbai to Saint Petersburg is about 3000 nautical miles longer. The transport corridor from Chennai to Vladivostok initially operated during the Soviet years.

In November 2024, Sarbananda Sonowal, the Minister of Ports, Shipping and Waterways of India announced that the corridor became operational and began carrying oil, food and machines. The final corridor spans 5,600 nautical miles and is expected to reduce cargo transport time between Russia's Far East ports and Indian ports from 40 to 24 days.

Other ports that have the potential of being linked include Visakhapatnam, Kolkata, Vostochny and Olga. Russia has proposed to include Vietnam, Thailand, and Indonesia as intermediate stops in the route.

== See also ==
- India's International connectivity projects
- Consulate General of Russia, Chennai
- India–Russia relations
- Chennai Port
- Ennore Port
- Economy of Chennai
