= Consulate General of Germany, Bengaluru =

Diplomatic mission in India

Consulate General of Germany, Bangalore
- Location: Bangalore
- Address: 2nd & 3rd floor, "Cash Pharmacy Building", Corner St. Mark's Road & Residency Road
- Coordinates: 12.9683°N 77.6004°E
- Consul General: Achim Burkart
- Website: Official website

The Consulate General of the Federal Republic of Germany in Bangalore represents the interests of the Government of Germany in the Indian states of Karnataka and Kerala. It was opened on 21 November 2008 in a temporary office in the central business district (CBD) of Bangalore. On 22 June 2012, the Consulate moved to its permanent premises in the corner of St. Mark's Road and Residency Road near the Bishop Cotton Girls' School. Achim Burkart is the current Consul General.

== Founding ==
The Consulate was inaugurated on 21 November 2008 by Foreign Minister of Germany Frank-Walter Steinmeier in the presence of ambassador to India Bernd Mützelburg and Consul General Stefan Graf in rented premises located in the CBD of Bangalore; however, the post was not to begin processing visa and work permit applications till 2011. It was the first Consulate General to start operations in Bangalore. Bangalore was chosen because of the presence of large German investments in Karnataka like Robert Bosch GmbH and the potential for more investment in the region.

The new premises located in the intersection of St. Mark's Road and Residency Road was inaugurated on 22 June 2012 by German Foreign Minister Guido Westerwelle in the presence of Chief Secretary of Karnataka S. V. Ranganath and the then Consul General Ingo Karsten.

== Services and activities ==
The Consulate General provides visa services to residents of Karnataka and Kerala along with consular services to German nationals.

In March 2012, the German Academic Exchange Service (DAAD) opened its fifth Indian office on the Consulate premises to promote academic and scientific knowledge transfer between Karnataka, Kerala and Germany. The office provides free counselling services for students and scholars interested in German education.

== See also ==
- List of diplomatic missions of Germany
- Foreign policy of Germany
- Foreign relations of India
- Foreign relations of Germany
- Germany–India relations
