= Teynampet =

- Neighbourhood
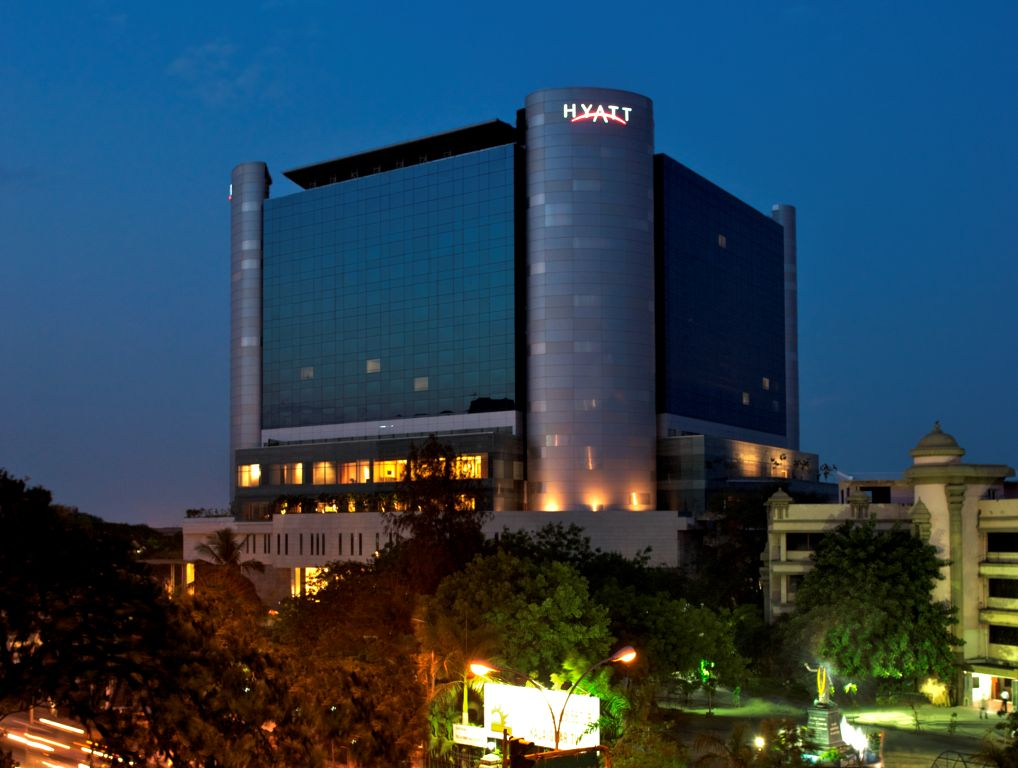
- The Hyatt Regency Hotel dominates the Teynampet skyline
- Interactive map of Teynampet
- Coordinates: 13.0437°N 80.2523°E
- Country: India
- State: Tamil Nadu
- District: Chennai
- Metro: Chennai
- Zone: 9
- Ward: 113

Government
  - Type: State
  - Body: Government of Tamil Nadu

Languages
  - Official: Tamil
- Time zone: UTC+5:30 (IST)
- PIN: 600 018
- Vehicle registration: TN-06
- Lok Sabha constituency: Chennai Central
- Legislative Assembly constituency: Thousand Lights

Teynampet, also Teynampettai, is a busy commercial locality in the city of Chennai, Tamil Nadu, India. Part of the city's central business district, it is surrounded by Gopalapuram in the north, Mylapore in the east, Alwarpet in the south, Nandanam in the south-west and T. Nagar in the west. The Teynampet Signal road junctions witnesses high vehicular traffic during peak hours. Teynampet is noted for expensive real estate, and the Teynampet section of Anna Salai hosts several government offices and luxury hotels.

== Etymology ==
Teynampet is along Anna Salai, the arterial road of Chennai. Teynampet derives its name from Thennam and pettai (Place of coconut trees) due to the coconut groves that once existed there.

== Geography ==
As of 2018, Teynampet zone had a green cover of more than 20 percent, as against the city's 14.9 percent average.

== Notable landmarks ==
Poes Garden houses two of the most celebrated houses in Chennai—residences of the former chief minister of Tamil Nadu J. Jayalalithaa named Veda Nilayam and the actor Rajinikanth. Poes Garden also houses the residences of the former acting general secretary of the AIADMK V. K. Sasikala named Jayalalithaa Illam and the actor Dhanush.

Gopalapuram area houses the residence of former chief minister of Tamil Nadu M. Karunanidhi. Teynampet also houses Anna Arivalayam, which is the headquarters of the DMK party; also PMK party headquarters at Vannia Teynampet and upscale hotels such as the Hyatt Regency and Marriott Courtyard. The famous Diocesan Church and the Anna Flyover are also in this region.

== Education ==
Teynampet houses two of Chennai's well known women's colleges, Justice Basheer Ahmed Sayeed College (more commonly known as SIET) and Stella Maris College. The schools in and around Teynampet include SIET Boys and Girls School, DAV Girls and D.A.V Boys School in Gopalapuram, Sri Sarada Matriculation School in Gopalapuram, National Public School (N.P.S) in Gopalapuram and Church Park Convent.

== Economy ==
Teynampet is a fastest growing retail hub. Prestige Polygon is home to Microsoft Corporation.

== Gallery ==
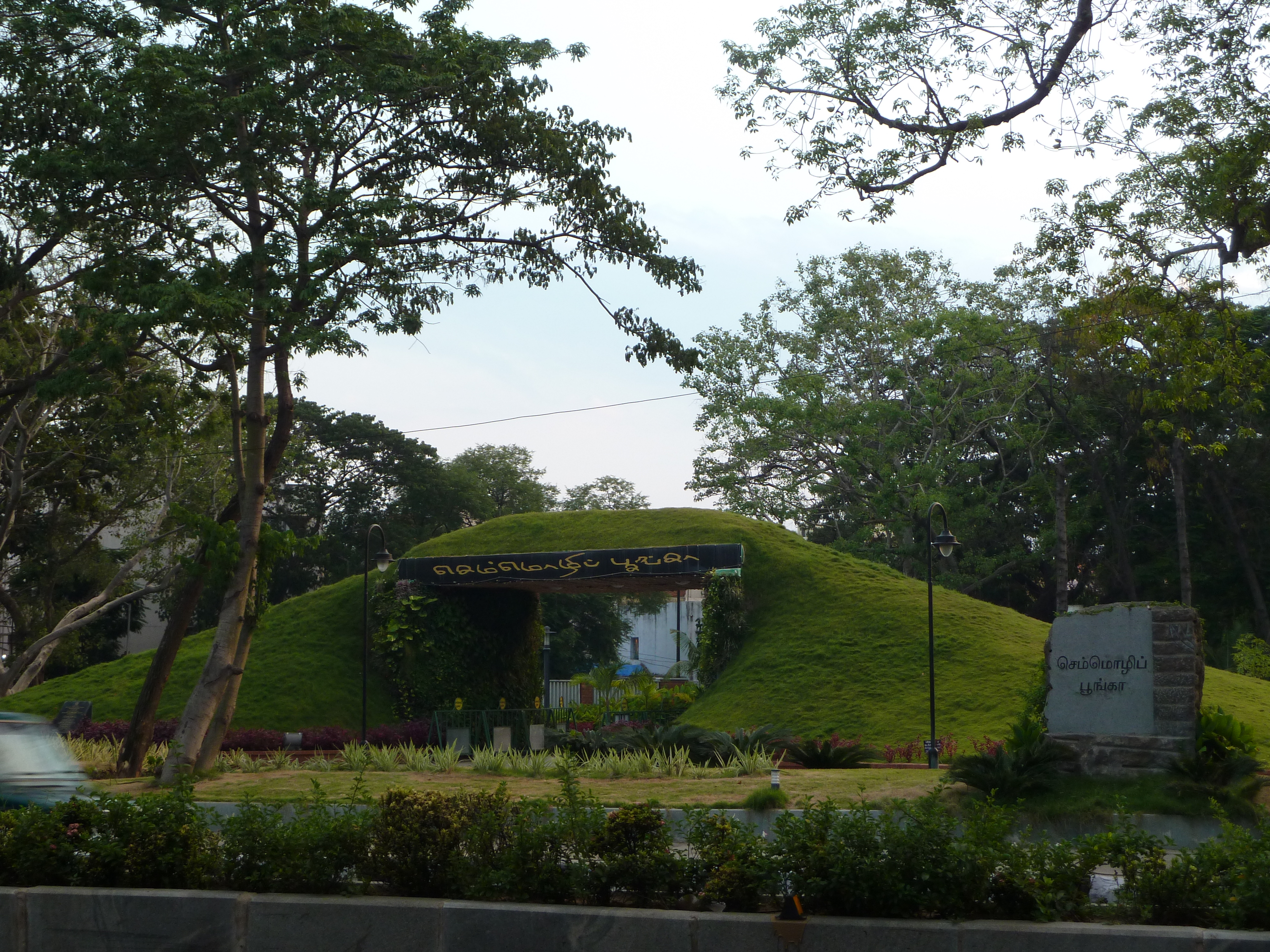
Semmozhi Poonga

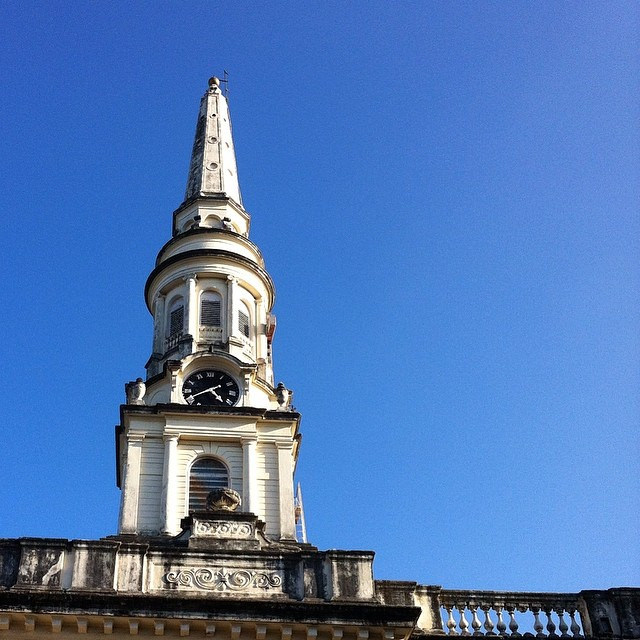
St George's Cathedral

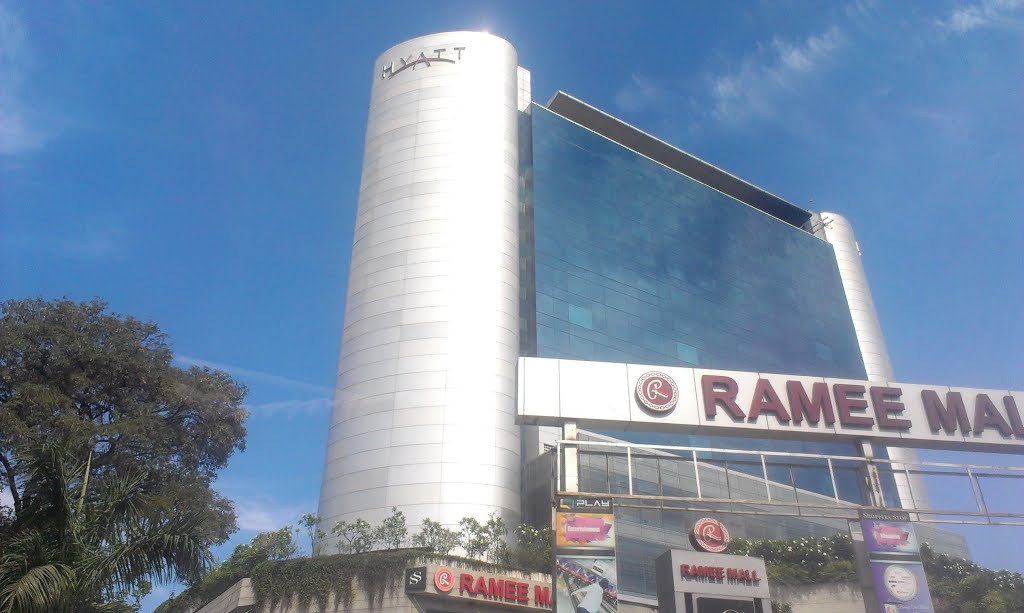
Ramee Mall
