= Raja Annamalaipuram =

Neighbourhood in Chennai, Tamil Nadu, India

Coordinates: 13°01′N 80°15′E

Raja Annamalaipuram, known shortly as R. A. Puram, is a neighbourhood in Chennai, India. Named after banker and philanthropist, S. Rm. M. Annamalai Chettiar who owned most of the property at one time, Raja Annamalaipuram extends along the northern banks of the Adyar River from Saidapet to the Bay of Bengal coast. PIN (postal) code for both Mandavelipakkam and Raja Annamalaipuram is 600028. The neighbourhood adjoins localities such as Mylapore, Mandaveli (which is considered as a part of Raja Annamalaipuram) and Alwarpet.
