= Nandanam =

- neighbourhood
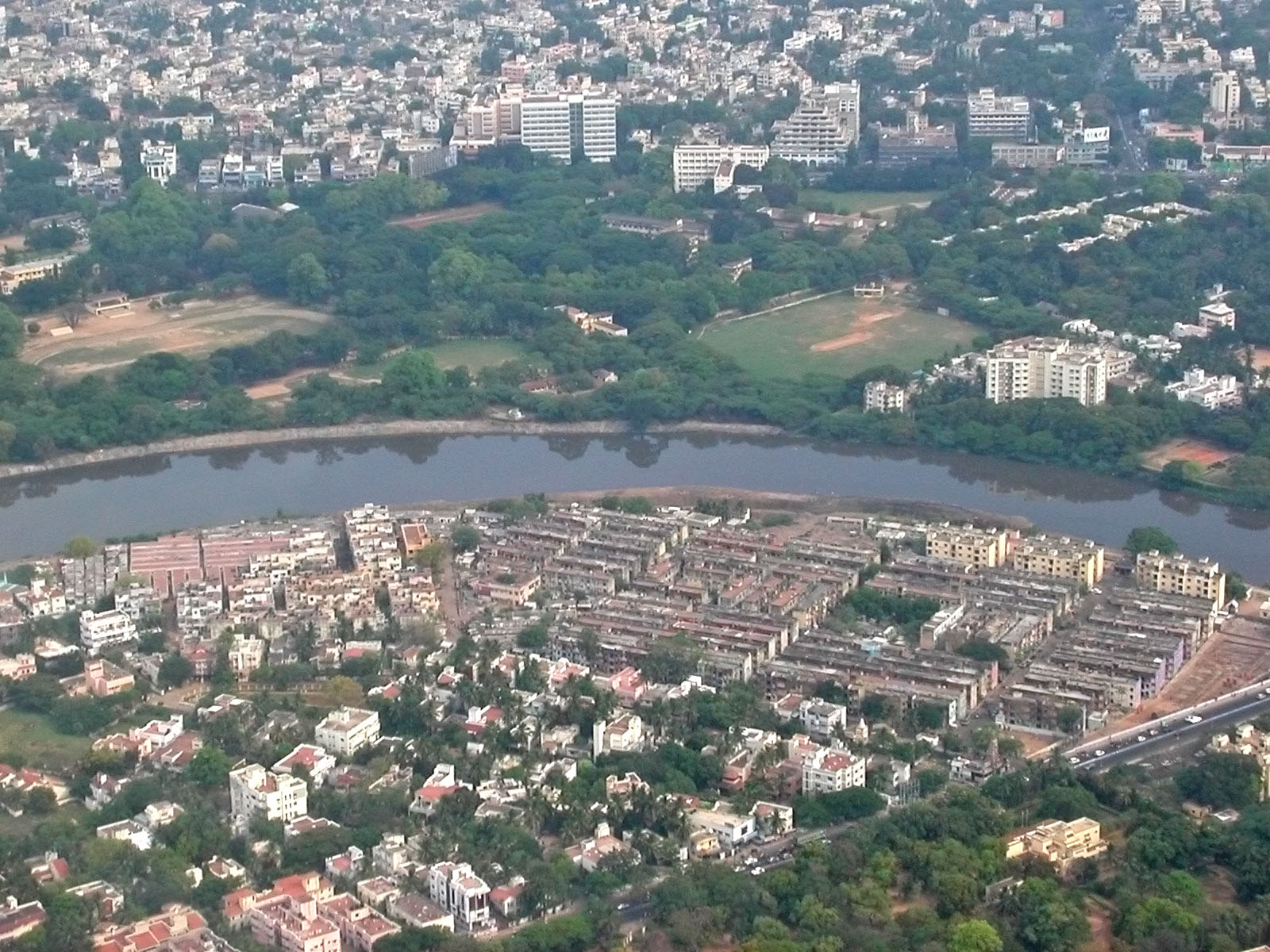
- Aerial view of Nandanam, seen here to the north of the Adyar River and Kotturpuram to the south.

- Location within Chennai Location within Tamil Nadu Location within India
- Coordinates: 13.0301°N 80.2416°E
- Country: India
- State: Tamil Nadu
- District: Chennai
- Metro: Chennai
- Zone: Kodambakkam
- Ward: 116
- Talukas: Mambalam-Guindy

Languages
  - Official: Tamil
- Time zone: UTC+5:30 (IST)
- Lok Sabha constituency: Chennai South
- Assembly constituency: Mylapore

Nandanam is a neighborhood in Chennai, India. It is located on the northern banks of Adyar River, on the other side of Kotturpuram, and is bound by Saidapet, T. Nagar and Teynampet. In addition to a number of institutions and companies, Nandanam offers a calm residential location. It is known for the Nandanam Arts College that was established in 1901 and the Nandanam Junction, commonly referred as "Nandanam signal", on the arterial Anna Salai—one of the busiest traffic junctions in Chennai.

== History ==
Nandanam seems to have originated in the piece of land known as Gambier's Gardens named after Chief Justice Edward John Gambier who owned the property from 1836 to 1850. The township got its name in the 1950s as a result of the housing development efforts instituted during the Chief Ministership of Rajagopalachari which concentrated on developing a green Chennai.

== Transportation ==
Nandanam has some MTC bus stops located on Anna Salai. Many buses pass through this area and offer connectivity to various places.

The nearest suburban railway stations are Mambalam and Saidapet.

Nandanam has a Chennai Metro station called Nandanam metro station.
