= India–Palestine relations =

- Palestine: India

Diplomatic mission
- Embassy of Palestine, New Delhi: Representative Office of India, Ramallah

Envoy
- Palestinian Ambassador to India Abdullah Abu Shawesh: Indian Ambassador to Palestine Mahima Sikand

India–Palestine relations (Arabic: العلاقات الهندية الفلسطينية), also known as Indian-Palestinian relations or Indo-Palestinian relations, are the bilateral relations between the Republic of India and the State of Palestine. These relations have been largely influenced by the independence struggle against British colonialism. India recognized Palestine's statehood following the Palestinian declaration of independence on 18 November 1988; although relations between India and the Palestine Liberation Organization were first established in 1974.

After India achieved its independence in 1947, the country has moved to support Palestinian self-determination following the partition of British India. Though it started to waver in the late 1980s and 1990s as the recognition of Israel led to diplomatic exchanges, the ultimate support for the Palestinian cause was still an underlying concern. Beyond the recognition for Palestinian self-determination ties have been largely dependent upon socio-cultural bonds, while economic relations were neither cold nor warm. India provided US$10 million relief to Palestine's annual budget on one occasion.

Since the establishment of diplomatic relations between India and Israel, there has been increased cooperation in military and intelligence ventures. Since then, Indian support for Palestine has been lukewarm although India still recognizes the legitimacy of aspirations of Palestine.

== History ==
=== Establishment of relations ===
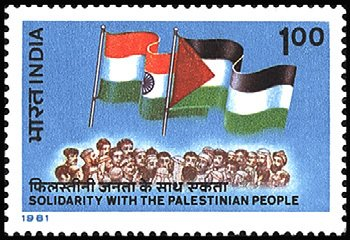
Stamp of India - 1981 - Solidarity with the Palestinian People

India was the first non-Arab country to contemporaneously recognize the Palestine Liberation Organization's authority as "the sole legitimate representative of the Palestinian people." A PLO office was set up in the Indian capital in 1975, with full diplomatic relations established in March 1980. India recognized Palestine's statehood following declaration on 18 November 1988; although relations between India and PLO were first established in 1974.

=== Upgrade of relations ===
India opened a Representative Office in Gaza on 25 June 1996 which was later shifted to Ramallah in 2003. Indian support was said to extend to "consistent and unwavering support" on the Palestinian issue, where it shared the perception that the question of Palestine is at the core of the Arab–Israeli conflict. India has thus consistently supported the legitimate right of the Palestinian people to a State and the consequent imperative need for a just, comprehensive and lasting peace in the region based on United Nations Security Council resolution 242, 338 and 425, as well as the principle of "Land for Peace." India has also supported the Madrid Conference of October, 1991.

India participated in the 2007 Annapolis Conference and the consequent donors conference. India's government noted the direct relevance for India on the issue and favoured the creation of "sovereign, independent, united states of Palestine" asserting that its support for the cause remains unwavered. External Affairs Minister, Pranab Mukherjee, briefed the Consultative Committee in his ministry saying, "India's support to the Palestinian cause has not wavered." Practically a year later, as a gesture of solidarity with the Palestinian cause, India gifted a piece of prized real estate in the Indian capital's elite diplomatic enclave for the building of an embassy of the Palestinian National Authority's President (PAP) Mahmoud Abbas. Abbas laid the foundation stone of the chancery-cum-residence complex of the embassy of Palestine, where the PAP Abbas formally dedicated the building to the people of Palestine from the people of India. The gift underscored India's "unwavering solidarity and commitment to an independent Palestine" and was seen by some to balance its growing relations with Israel. On his visit, the PAP said that India had played a great role in West Asia peace process. After the ceremonial reception and a guard of honour at the forecourt of Rashtrapati Bhawan, Abbas said relations between India and Palestine had always been good and that the two countries were making efforts to improve such relations. "You know how good relations we have, between India and Palestine since [the] great Indira Gandhi and [the] great Yasir Arafat. And everyday, it's improving. We are very glad with the help and the support of the Indian people to the Palestine." The next day the Indian Prime Minister Manmohan Singh said, "India believes that the solution should be based on the relevant UN Resolutions, the Arab Peace Plan and the Quartet road map resulting in a sovereign, independent, viable and united State of Palestine living within secure and recognised borders, side by side at peace with Israel. In 2008, the prime minister of India also gave a statement that "We hope to see the realisation of a sovereign, independent, united and viable Palestine, co-existing peacefully with Israel. I have reaffirmed our position on this to President Abbas during our conversation today."" A joint statement also added that "India also called for an end to the expansion of Israeli settlements in occupied Palestine and for an early and significant easing of restrictions on the free movement of persons and goods within Palestine." India co-sponsored and voted in favour of a UNGA resolution changing Palestine's observer status from "non-member observer entity" to "non-member observer state" in November 2012.

Domestic Palestinian controversy arose, however, as Abbas received some flak for his intransigence. On the visit to India he stated that the country's "growing relationship with Israel is not a matter of concern for [the] Palestinians" as New Delhi's support for Palestinian independence remained clear. He was condemned for making an "utterly irresponsible, gratuitous statement" as "shameful" as it was "politically futile" and stood no chance to win the PA anything in return. Without an apparatus of Palestinian democratic accountability by the representatives of the people the flood of official Palestinian concessions was "guaranteed to continue unabated" as it would cause further damage to the struggle for "inalienable rights." While talking about India's growing engagement with Israel, particularly in the field of defence, Abbas said, "India's relations with Israel is its sovereign decision. We are not going to interfere. We know very well that India is supportive of the Palestinian struggle for achieving its own independence." His controversial comments were in stark contrast to report than India became Israel's second largest trading partner, while India became Israel's largest arm's market and the latter became the former's largest arms supplier. However, it was also said that the Palestinian economy has "incredible potential" which could be unleashed if the Israeli restrictions on Palestinian movement were lifted, this was accorded by the regional World Bank chief just after a high-level World Bank delegation inaugurated a sewage storage facility on a rare trip to the Hamas-ruled Gaza.

While Indian support has often relied on the age-old, and often qualifiable propaganda basis, certain points did bind the pre-partition states of Ireland, India, and Palestine. On this front, where Israel "unabashedly defends the rights of Jews over all others, India (as a state) has never claimed religious exclusivism for it's [sic] Hindu citizens," this gave credence to a legitimate support for the Palestinian cause. It was also shown, through academic analysis, that "economic factors can have a profound impact efforts to resolve conflict peaceably." With this aforementions disclaimer, India could, theoretically, be an important ally to improve tensions. Studies of such parallels have also shown that economic factors do now draw positive yields.

== Indian aid to Palestine ==
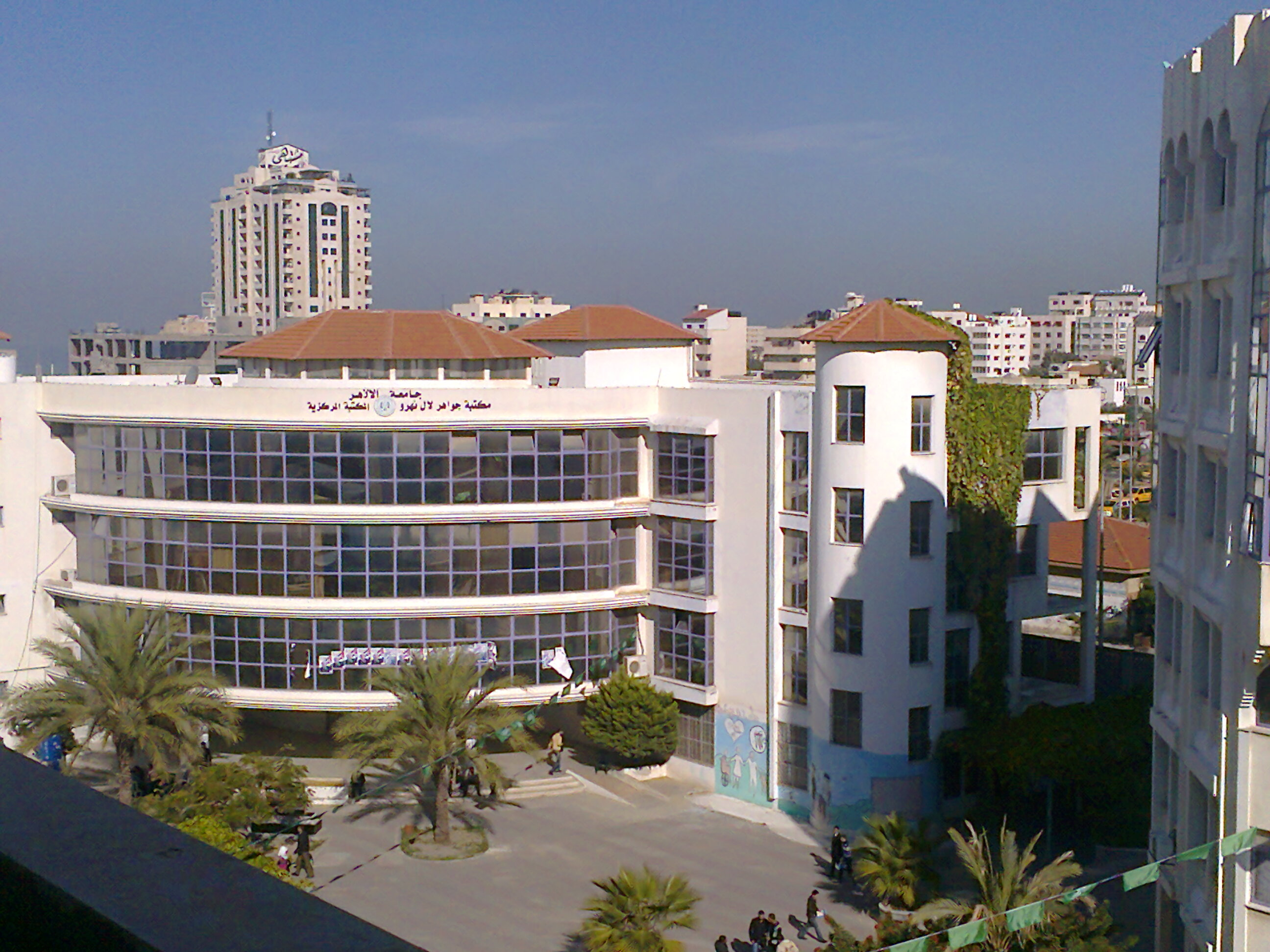
Library at al-Azhar University, Gaza Strip

At the Washington Donors Conference in October, 1995, India pledged US$1 million for assistance to the Palestinian people. At the subsequent pledging conference in Paris in January, 1996, India pledged another US$1 million which was utilised for construction of a Library-cum-Activity Centre at the Palestinian Technical College in Deir-El-Balah and another Library at the Al-Azhar University in Gaza. At yet another International Donors Conference in Washington DC on 30 November 1998, India pledged another US$1 million. The sum of US$300,000 was disbursed to Al-Azhar University for the construction of two additional floors to its library. The remaining amount was utilised for a Human Resource Development Programme.

Following a visit of a security delegation to India in March 1997, led by the Head of the Palestinian Security Forces, Maj Gen Nasser Yussef, India offered 51 specialised security training slots to Palestinians in various disciplines during the year 1997–98, which accounted for an estimated expenditure of ₹ 55 lakhs. India also continued to offer 8 scholarships under ICCR Schemes to Palestinian students for higher studies in India, while also offering several slots for training courses under the ITEC Programme.

India added more than 50 training slots, at a cost of ₹ 40,63,000, to Palestinian personnel for specialised training courses during the financial year 1998–99, where 58 Palestinian officers completed their training. During the financial year 1999–2000, 38 more Palestinian officers utilised the facilities for training. In October 2008 PAP President Abbas visited New Delhi where he met with Indian Prime Minister Manmohan Singh who announced an assistance of US$20 million to the Palestinian Authority and promised to do all New Delhi can to help it in the PNA's endeavours.

PNA President Mahmoud Abbas paid a state visit to India in September 2012, during which India pledged US$10 million as aid. Indian officials said it was the third such donation, adding that New Delhi was committed to helping other development projects. India also pledged support to Palestine's bid for full and equal membership of the UN. Three pacts – on building schools, on Information Technology and imparting vocational training – were signed between the two side after the talks. Indian Prime Minister Manmohan Singh said: "Support for the Palestinian cause has been a cornerstone of India's foreign policy. I reiterated India's firm support for the struggle of the Palestinian people to achieve a sovereign, independent, viable and united state of Palestine with East Jerusalem as its capital."

=== Refugees ===
The first group of Palestinian refugees from Iraq arrived in India in March 2006. Generally, they were unable to find work in India as they spoke only Arabic though some found employment with UNHCR India's non-governmental partners. All of them were provided with free access to governmental hospitals. Of the 165 Palestinian refugees from Iraq in India, 137 of them found clearance for resettlement in Sweden.

== Cultural ties ==
As in many countries around the world, including those in Eastern Europe, South East Asia and the South Asian periphery, the Bollywood legacy continues to build soft power prerogatives for India.

== Economic ties ==
An Indian company, M/s Satyam, Hyderabad (and M/s United Information Technology), were jointly awarded by Palestine Telecommunications Co a contract for the supply and implementation of Oracle Financial System in Nablus, West Bank.

== High level Diplomatic visits ==
PLO President Yasser Arafat visited India on 20–22 November 1997. He also paid a one-day visit to India on 10 April 1999. In 1997 a Memorandum of Understanding on Co-operation was signed between the two states. The MOU provided for a structured framework for bilateral co-operation in such diverse areas as commerce, trade, culture, science & technology, industrial collaboration, information and broadcasting, amongst others. Arafat also laid the foundation stone of an auditorium to be built by the Indo-Arab League in Hyderabad. In April, 1997 he attended the 12th Ministerial Conference of Non-Aligned Movement, where he addressed the NAM Foreign Ministers in a special session.

The PLO's executive committee member, Sulaiman Najjab, visited India to participate in a seminar on "Prospects for Peace in the Middle East," organised by the United Nations' Department of Information on 3–4 February 1998. The Palestinian Minister of Housing and Energy, Abdel Rahman Hamad, visited India in April, 1998 to attend another seminar organised by the Council of Arab Ambassadors. During the visit, he called on the Minister of Petroleum and Natural Gas and the Minister of External Affairs. A Member of the executive committee of Al-Fateh, in charge of foreign relations and a member of the Palestine National Council, Hani Al-Hasan, visited India as a representative of the PLO to attend the 17th Congress of the Communist Party of India (CPI) held at Chennai from 18 to 20 September 1998. He also called on the Minister of External Affairs.

An Indian official delegation visited the Palestinian self-rule areas in May, 1997 and called on President Arafat in Gaza. The Minister for External Affairs, Saleem I Shervani, met the Foreign Minister of the State of Palestine, Farouk Kaddoumi, at Tunis on 5 September 1997. Following this an MOU on Bilateral Co-operation between the Government of India and the PNA was concluded in November, 1997. There was a strengthening of co-operation in the field of trade, culture and information.

Prime Minister of India Narendra Modi visited the West Bank on 10 February 2018, which was the first visit by an Indian Prime Minister to the Palestinian territories. During the trip to Palestine, Modi was conferred Grand Collar of the State of Palestine on 10 February 2018. Since his election in 2014, the Modi government has maintained a de-hyphenation policy, where it keeps its relations with Israel and Palestine independent from each other.

== Incidents Involving Indians ==
=== 1986 Hijacking of Pan Am Flight 73 ===
Pan Am Flight 73 was a Pan American World Airways flight from Mumbai, India, to New York City, United States, with scheduled stops in Karachi, Pakistan, and Frankfurt, West Germany.

On September 5, 1986, the Boeing 747 serving the flight was hijacked while on the ground at Karachi by four armed Palestinian militants of the Abu Nidal Organization. The aircraft, with 360 passengers on board, had just arrived from Bombay. A grand jury later concluded that the hijackers were planning to use the hijacked airliner to pick up Palestinian prisoners in both Cyprus and Israel.

More than twenty passengers were killed during the hijacking, including nationals from India, the United Kingdom, Italy, Pakistan, and Mexico. All hijackers were arrested and sentenced to death in Pakistan. However, the sentences were later commuted to life in prison. Senior Purser Neerja Bhanot was shot dead and posthumously received four awards: India's highest peacetime award for bravery, the Ashok Chakra Award, the United States Special Courage award, and two awards from Pakistan, which were Tamgha-e-Pakistan, the fourth highest civil award from Pakistan for her efforts to save passengers' lives, and the Nishan-e-Pakistan.

=== Death of Indian Ambassador in Palestine in 2022 ===
In August 2021, the Government of India appointed Mukul Arya, a career diplomat of the Indian Foreign Service, as its Representative to the State of Palestine, based in Ramallah. Arya previously served in key diplomatic postings, including Afghanistan, Russia, and Indonesia, as well as at India's Permanent Delegation to UNESCO in Paris.

On 6 March 2022, Arya was found deceased at the official residence of the Indian mission in Ramallah. His sudden passing prompted condolences from both the Indian Ministry of External Affairs and the Palestinian Ministry of Foreign Affairs. Cause of death has never been disclosed. Palestinian officials assured full cooperation in the matter and praised Arya's contribution to the strengthening of India–Palestine ties.
