= India–Taiwan relations =

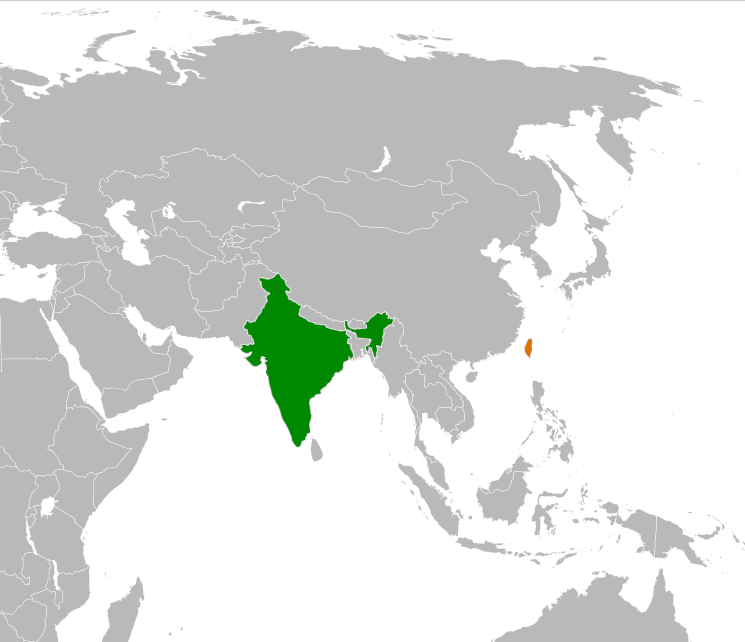
- India: Taiwan

Diplomatic mission
- India Taipei Association: Taipei Economic and Cultural Center in India

India and Republic of China (ROC) had formal diplomatic relations from 1942 to 1949. After severing diplomatic relations in favor of the People's Republic of China (PRC) in 1949, bilateral relations have improved since the 1990s, despite both countries not maintaining official diplomatic relations. India does not officially recognize Taiwan, but its economic and commercial links as well as people-to-people contacts with Taiwan have expanded in recent years.

In May 2020, two members of the Indian Parliament virtually attended the newly elected President Tsai Ing-wen's swearing in ceremony and praised Taiwanese democracy, thereby sending what some have termed a warning message to China and signaling a strengthening of relations between the Tsai and Narendra Modi administrations. In July 2020, the Indian government appointed a top career diplomat, Joint Secretary Gourangalal Das, the former head of the U.S. division in India's Ministry of External Affairs, as its new envoy to Taiwan. In August 2023, former Chief of Army Staff, Manoj Mukund Naravane, former Navy Chief Karambir Singh, and former Air Chief Marshal R. K. S. Bhadauria visited Taipei.

== Background ==
In April 1942, the Commission of the Republic of China in India was established in New Delhi. In May, the Indian Commission in ROC was also established in Chungking (Chongqing), the temporary capital. On October 21, 1946, the envoys of the Republic of China and India were promoted to ambassadors and embassies were established in each other's countries. On August 15, 1947, the Dominion of India was established in accordance with the Mountbatten Plan, and diplomatic relations continued. The Dominion of India recognized the ROC from 1947 to 1950, while Pakistan recognized the ROC until 1951. During the negotiations with the PRC for opening diplomatic relations, India agreed not to have official relations with the ROC or support Taiwan's membership in the UN as the representative of China. Over time, Nehru and other Indian government officials also grew increasingly disillusioned by American-allied leaders Chiang and Syngman Rhee's "strong-arm tactics" under their largely authoritarian but pro-Western governments; Nehru especially found it difficult to understand why and how America justified supporting some of their controversial policies whilst simultaneously advocating world democracy.

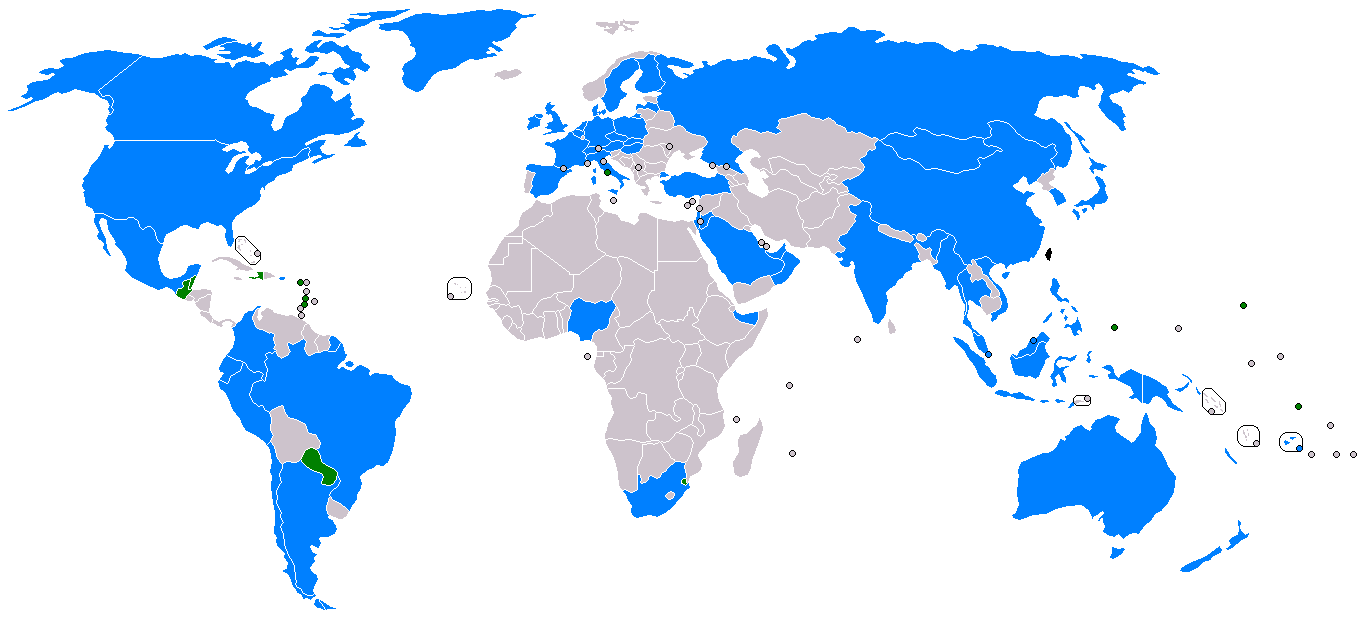
Countries maintaining diplomatic relations with the ROC diplomatic relations and embassy in Taipei unofficial relations (see text)

India officially recognised the PRC on 1 April 1950, and was supportive of its stand that it was the only state that could be recognised as "China", thus voting in favour of the PRC's bid to join the United Nations and replacing the ROC as the sole legitimate government of China in the UN Security Council. There was no mention, however, of the One China policy by either party in the formal communications exchanged between Nehru and Zhou Enlai at the time of India's recognition of the PRC. After the 1962 Sino-Indian war, India's policy remained unchanged. In fact India has always followed the "One China policy" of the People's Republic of China, but it was not until 1996 that the official statement between the two countries mentioned "One China". The last time India affirmed the "One-China" policy was in 2008. Since then, Delhi simply referred to its ‘well-known’ position rather than state it explicitly.

== Cold War era ==
=== Historical border dispute ===
Like the People's Republic of China, the Kuomintang-led Republic of China in Dang Guo era claims Aksai Chin and Arunachal Pradesh, which is the fully fledged state of the Republic of India, as part of its sovereign territory. While the PRC and Pakistan managed to largely resolve their former territorial dispute in 1963 through the Sino-Pakistan Agreement, neither India nor the ROC officially recognizes this treaty, and as such, India claims PRC-occupied parts of Kashmir and the ROC claimed parts of Pakistan-administered Kashmir in addition to the disputed territories with India. However, after Taiwan's democratization in the 1990s, relevant laws have excluded territory governed by India from the scope of Mainland China, as does the official map of Taiwan's foreign ministry.

Throughout the Cold War, the government of ROC (Taiwan) generally had the same basic understanding on the China-India border dispute as the People's Republic of China (PRC), and in 1962, around the time of the Sino-Indian War, Taiwan's Ministry of Foreign Affairs stated that they did not recognise the legality of McMahon Line. The same year Western countries increased pressure on the then ROC President, Chiang Kai-shek, to recognise the legality of McMahon Line in order to isolate Beijing. However, Chiang dismissed McMahon Line as 'imperialist imposition on China'.

At the same time, as India began to gradually lose ground against the PRC during the course of the border conflict, Nehru began reaching out to various other anti-Communist powers, including the Taiwan-based ROC government led by Chiang, with whom he had maintained close contacts with since their initial meeting during the Second World War, seeking aid and assistance. Some U.S. officials, such as Navy Admiral Harry D. Felt, the Commander-in-Chief of the U.S. Pacific Fleet from 1958 to 1964, also encouraged Chiang to use the opportunity to strike mainland China from the east while part of its military was occupied by the border war.

The ROC Ministry of Foreign Affairs's reaction was somewhat mixed, and based upon pragmatism and its fundamental priority of containing Communism at the same time, with the PLA deemed a constant existential threat to its government in the 1960s. It declared that the war was a conflict between "Indian nationalism and international communism, not a war between the Indian people and the Chinese people", and though it clearly repeated its refusal to recognize the McMahon Line, it also claimed that the PRC's war was not necessarily about territory alone, but rather used within the broader context of an alleged Communist agenda to expand its ideology throughout most of Asia, implying that even if there were no dispute over land, conflict would still have occurred eventually. The statement also noted that the ROC believed "a fair and reasonable solution" should be found were the mainland to be reclaimed, "that there was absolutely no need to use force", and insisted that the attack against India allegedly "violated the traditional peace-loving spirit of the Chinese people". The Vice President of the ROC, Chen Cheng, also condemned the PRC as the "initiator and the aggressor" in the war in a November 1962 statement, again citing ideological differences rather than territorial ones as largely being responsible for the outbreak in hostilities.

The ROC Foreign Ministry declared during the conflict: "The Communist bandit-Indian border conflict has become more and more serious. The communist bandits are warlike, and have infiltrated subversion and threatened neighbors by force as their strategy. There are many internal difficulties. They used foreign military ventures to divert the attention of the mainland people and strengthen the suppression of the bandit-controlled areas. As for the so-called McMahon Line that the United Kingdom has unilaterally advocated for the border between China and India when it ruled India, our government has never accepted it and is firmly opposed to it." The Ministry also sent a telegram overseas to all its overseas embassies, instructing them to avoid criticizing Nehru while remaining resolute in its stance regarding the disputed territories, and remaining open to the hopes of re-establishing relations between the two governments given the collapse of PRC-India relations following the war.

However, despite this, Nehru was surprised when the ROC representatives sent to New Delhi, despite expressing support for India against the so-called "Communist bandits", also emphasized that "Southern Tibet" belonged to China from their point of view, causing bilateral talks for concrete support to break down. Chiang had also rejected America's official recognition of the McMahon Line, and further rebuffed Admiral Felt's call for Taiwan's counterattacking the mainland (even with an assurance from John F. Kennedy that the U.S. would support the ROC with all its strength), saying that were he to do so, he would be scolded by all the generations of Yanhuang, or the descendants of the ancient Chinese people. Despite Nehru's pleas and Felt's repeated urgings, Chiang firmly refused to change his stance; regardless of his personal feelings for Nehru or his alliance with the Americans, he considered himself a Chinese nationalist first and foremost, and therefore placed the interests of his nation as he saw them before either, and while reclaiming the mainland was indeed a major priority for him, he seemingly felt it dishonorable to attempt doing so while mainland China was actively engaged with another nation. After Chen Cheng urged him to reconsider his views, Chiang quietly pointed out that although the PRC's economic strength was not yet equal to Taiwan's, its military power had increased considerably over the years, and that the PLA had dispatched only a tenth of its forces to the Indian border; he noted that if they were to act rashly, not only would they fail to make any significant difference, they might also risk losing Taiwan itself as a result.

After the border conflict, Nehru returned to Santiniketan and prepared to make a passionate speech condemning "Chinese aggression", but purportedly softened after seeing in the audience his old friend of thirty years, Tan Yun-Shan, a famous scholar who had dedicated his life to building friendship between their two civilizations and who had helped organize Chiang and Nehru's earlier meetings, and instead of his official speech, insisted that the quarrel was not with the Chinese people but between their governments, and that China's people would always be India's friends.

Despite a considerable surge in anti-Communist sentiment in India following India's defeat in the 1962 war, the Indian government did not elect to renew its official diplomatic ties with the ROC. However, the PRC noted that there was a significantly increased unofficial cooperation between Nehru and Chiang's governments afterwards. According to an April 1963 article in its state-run newspaper New China News Agency, "The foregoing facts have made it clear that the Nehru government and the Chiang Kai-shek gang have increased collusion and brought their relations to a new stage of joint political and military opposition to China." The article also noted that around February 1963, despite their earlier estrangement, Nehru even sent his "personal good wishes to the Generalissimo", and had welcomed Chinese Nationalist agents skilled in countering internal Communist insurgencies and widespread espionage to India. In another article published around the same time, Taiwan's Central Daily News, the official newspaper of the KMT, noted that, "Any country, whatever its stand in the past, can become our friend, as long as it today stands firm on the side of freedom and makes practical efforts against communism and against aggression. This is our basic stand and attitude toward India."

In addition, covert Indian, American and Taiwanese support for the Tibetan rebels intensified in the aftermath, with the former two governments establishing the Joint Mission Center to counter the PRC in Tibet, and helping to train thousands of Tibetan rebels to prepare for the event of a second conflict. Furthermore, via the Tibetan exiles, specifically the Dalai Lama's second-eldest brother Gyalo Thondup, who shared close personal ties with Chiang Kai-shek after having grown up under his tutelage when the ROC still ruled Nanjing, a close relationship between the Indian and Taiwanese intelligence agencies was then established, one which apparently endures to the modern day.

The Taiwanese government coordinated some of its secret anti-Communist efforts alongside both the American and Indian governments, with Taipei stationing translators at Charbatia to regular monitor PRC radio traffic, and establishing remote listening outposts along the Indo-Tibetan frontier to gather critical intelligence to be shared with the other two governments and the Tibetan fighters. Wayne Sanford, a CIA paramilitary officer stationed in New Delhi, later recalled in October 1965 reuniting with a Taiwanese commander whom he had known from the ROC's evacuation from the Dachen Islands during his visit to an Indian border outpost, where the two of them reminisced about happier times as they shared a drink together.

Gyalo had studied under the Chiangs' sponsorship in China, describing them as "unfailingly warm and gracious hosts" who treated him like a son and paid for all his expenses, and he "greatly admired" Sun's Three Principles of the People. Although he remained loyal to his people's cause throughout the rest of his life, he long regarded the Tibetan system as stagnant and flawed, in desperate need of reform and modernization, and ignored some of his people's traditions, even marrying a fellow student Zhu Dan, whose brother and father were high-ranking officers in the KMT's navy and army respectively, and who worked in a Nanjing hospital caring for children and refugees after the Second World War. After the Chinese Civil War, he and his wife moved to Taiwan for a year, then to the United States (with Chiang giving him $50,000 to complete his higher education and encouraging him to study hard), and finally to Kalimpong in West Bengal. Around late 1964 after the border conflict, Gyalo visited the Chiangs one last time in Taiwan, with Chiang and his wife reportedly being "delighted" to see him again and open to his suggestion of cooperating with India, after which Gyalo introduced Director Wang of Taiwan's national security to Nehru's close associate Bhola Nath Mullik in New Delhi, beginning a long-term secret collaboration between the two governments. In 1959, Gyalo's wife Zhu Dan had helped establish the Tibetan Self-Help Center, a charitable organization providing emergency relief aid to Tibetan refugees in Lebong, which remains active today, tending to the various needs of the local Tibetan people.

In February 1987, India's move to elevate the status of 'Arunachal centrally administered region' to the state of Arunachal Pradesh was declared null and void by Taiwan's Ministry of Foreign Affairs. The Ministry, in a formal statement, stated that it did not recognise 'illegal occupation' of ROC territory south of McMahon Line and the establishment of 'Arunachal Pradesh state' was an illegal act. In 1995, Ambassador Pei-yin Teng (Taiwan's first representative to India) in response to an Indian member of Parliament, stated that Taiwan did not recognise McMahon Line. However, Pei-yin Teng was the last Taiwanese official who made a statement against the McMahon Line. Since, then Taiwan has not made any statement on China-India dispute and has adopted a neutral stance on the dispute.

In recent years, Taiwan has also regularly fielded military attaches to close allies and partners whom it does not have official diplomatic relations with, such as the U.S., Japan and Singapore, as well as India: "Unofficial military attaches have been placed within Taiwan's new de facto embassy, the Taipei Economic Cultural Centre, while senior Indian military officers regularly visit Taipei on ordinary rather than official passports." An Indian source stated that Taiwan's familiarity with Chinese troop deployments in western China was of particular interest to India and of crucial strategic benefit to Indian interests, although another Indian source declined to comment on security cooperation, and alleged that India's "engagement with Taiwan is limited to economic and commercial links...and people to people contacts."

=== Views on Tibet and the Dalai Lama ===
At the 1947 Asian Relations Conference hosted in New Delhi, representatives of the Indian independence movement invited Tibetan delegates, and the Tibetans were allowed to display their flag at the conference. According to Tibetologist A. Tom Grunfeld, the conference was not government-sponsored, and so Tibet's and the Tibetan flag's presence had "no diplomatic significance". Nonetheless, the ROC, also present at the conference, protested Tibet's showing, and in response, the Tibetan flag was removed and conference organizers issued a statement that Nehru invited the Tibetan delegates "in a personal capacity".

Although his government also officially viewed Tibet as part of China, after the 1959 Tibetan Rebellion, Chiang Kai-shek announced in his Letter to Tibetan Friends (Chinese: 告西藏同胞書; pinyin: Gào Xīzàng Tóngbāo Shū) that the ROC's policy would be to help the Tibetan diaspora overthrow the People's Republic of China's rule in Tibet. The ROC's Mongolian and Tibetan Affairs Commission sent secret agents to India to disseminate pro-Kuomintang (KMT) and anti-Communist propaganda among Tibetan exiles. From 1971 to 1978, the MTAC also recruited ethnic Tibetan children from India and Nepal to study in Taiwan, with the expectation that they would work for a ROC government that returned to the mainland. In 1994, the veterans' association for the Tibetan guerrilla group Chushi Gangdruk met with the MTAC and agreed to the KMT's One China Principle. In response, the Dalai Lama's Central Tibetan Administration forbade all exiled Tibetans from contact with the MTAC. However, tensions between the two communities were eased considerably after the Dalai Lama's first official visit to Taiwan in 1997, under KMT President Lee Teng-hui.

Towards the end of the Second World War, Chiang had offered military supplies for the Tibetans, in his statement pledging that "if the Tibetans should at this time express the wish for self-government...[China] would, in conformity with our sincere traditions, accord it a very high degree of autonomy", and even stipulating that if the Tibetans eventually fulfilled the economic requirements for independence, China would "help them attain that status". Chiang also later told Gyalo Thondup that with if he later completed his education in America, and returned as an advisor to his brother the Dalai Lama, with the British's foreign influence removed from Tibet, he would feel China's "back door" would be secure enough for him to consider the Tibetan people's sovereign wishes, although such a promise was "easier for Chiang to make than to deliver".

However, his later statements and viewpoints after the Chinese Civil War and during the Cold War seem to be somewhat conflicting. After the Dalai Lama fled to India in 1959 amidst violence in Tibet, Chiang vowed to "assist the Tibetan people to realize their own aspirations with the principle of self-determination...as soon as the puppet Communist regime on the mainland is overthrown and the people of Tibet are once again free to express their will." However, he and other Taiwanese officials at times also expressed opposition to the concept of Tibetan independence being discussed by American officials. ROC Foreign Minister Huang Shao-ku told Everett F. Drumright, the U.S. Ambassador in Taiwan, that the ROC would support an autonomous government by the Dalai Lama (as then proposed by Nehru), but if he were to proclaim a separate independent government, then Taiwan could only offer him covert moral support. In essence, the ROC after the 1959 uprising opposed both the PRC's repression in Tibet and an immediate declaration of Tibetan independence; however, they would not necessarily be averse to discussing the possibility of eventual "self-determination" for Tibet, under the right circumstances, were the ROC to successfully reclaim the mainland.

You are now shedding your blood in fighting against the Communist tyranny. This noble deed begins the first page of the most solemn and glorious history of the anti-Communist revolution of our compatriots on the Chinese mainland. Although I am now in Taiwan, my heart has been always with you in your war against Communism. With regard to the recent battle of Lhasa, I have been especially concerned with the heroic sacrifices made by our Tibetan brethren and their priests whose fate is constantly in my mind. The Government of the Republic of China is making every possible effort to give you continuous and effective aid. It is also calling upon our compatriots at home and abroad to extend to you their positive support....You are not standing alone. You have displayed an undaunted spirit in your campaign against the Red terror. You are not only struggling for the survival of the Tibetan people and the preservation of liberty of the individual Tibetans but also serving as the gallant vanguard in the defense of freedom and security for peoples of all religions in a free Asia. All countries and peoples of the world who love peace and uphold justice are standing on your side, giving you support and praying for your victory. The Government of the Republic of China has always respected the traditional political and social structures of Tibet, and upheld the religious faith of its people as well as their freedom to have their own way of life. Today I wish to affirm emphatically that regarding Tibet's future political institutions and status as soon as the puppet Communist regime on the mainland is overthrown and the people of Tibet are once again free to express their will, the Government will assist the Tibetan people to realize their own aspirations in accordance with the principle of self-determination."

— Chiang Kai-shek's March 1959 official statement after the 1959 Tibetan uprising,

The ROC's official stance towards the Tibetan people was generally sympathetic and largely opposed to the PRC's actions against Tibetans, but nevertheless avoided supporting full Tibetan independence, roughly in alignment with Nehru's own policies regarding Tibet. The ROC acknowledged its support for anti-Communist guerillas in Tibet since 1957, and also encouraged other countries to extend their moral and material support for the Tibetan people. ROC Vice President Chen Cheng stated in a March 1959 interview: "The principle of nationalism of the Three People's Principles advocates that all racial groups within the nation should be equal. Accordingly, the Government has, in regard to Tibet, always respected the traditional political structure, religious belief and way of life of the Tibetans and assisted in their political, economic and cultural development. The present situation is that only after the tyrannical Communist regime is overthrown can our nation enjoy the bright future that is destined to be ours, and only then can all the racial groups which make up our nation enjoy their normal development. The immediate task is therefore to unite all our efforts to crush the Communist tyranny first. As to the guiding principle of the Government's policy in regard to the political status of Tibet after the Communist regime has toppled, the President has made it clear that the Government will assist the Tibetan people to realize their own aspirations in accordance with the principle of self-determination as soon as the people of Tibet are once again free to express their will."

In his official statement given to the United Nations General Assembly after the failed 1959 Tibetan uprising, Tingfu F. Tsiang (the Permanent Representative of the ROC to the UN and Taiwan's U.S. ambassador) strongly condemned the treatment of the Tibetan people by the PRC, even stating that the Communists' actions "exceeded the worst treatment that any colonial or dependent people in Asia or Africa has ever experienced" and urging other U.N. states to speak out against the PRC's killing of Tibetans. He further noted that, "The whole enterprise of the subjugation of Tibet by the Chinese Communists cannot be justified on the grounds of Chinese welfare or Tibetan welfare. It is a part of the general expansionism and chauvinism of the Chinese Communists.... It should be remembered by all the delegates present that all the political and social systems existing in the world today, other than the communist system, have been condemned at one time or other by international communism as reactionary and feudalistic. It is the belief of my delegation that the Assembly, in showing concern for the fate of the Tibetan people, shows its concern for, human decency. And, as time passes, we will discover that this question of Tibet is an important part of the problem of world peace and security."

Although the PRC rejects all official contact with the Central Tibetan Administration, the Dalai Lama, along with representatives from his government who are still based in India to this day, has since visited Taiwan several times, under both KMT and DPP administrations, first in 1997, then in 2001, and the last time in 2009 under KMT President Ma Ying-Jeou.

According to Taiwan Foreign Ministry spokeswoman Joanne Ou under Tsai's administration, “We will, in accordance with the principle of mutual respect and at a time of convenience for both sides, welcome the Dalai Lama to come to Taiwan again to propagate Buddhist teachings." The Dalai Lama, in turn, has allegedly received an invitation to visit, and intended to do so in 2021.

In July 2019, Luo Wen-jia, Secretary General of the DPP, met with the Dalai Lama in India, with Luo noting that the Taiwanese and Tibetans faced "common threats", but due to sharing similar democratic values and the same spiritual faith, the two peoples could find ways to cooperate. Luo further conveyed the DPP's support to Tibetans striving for democracy and freedom, with the DPP and other Taiwanese parties having helped organize annual marches in Taipei in commemoration of the anniversary of Tibetan Uprising Day. In the 2022 annual rally, DPP Legislator Lin Ching-yi, while citing the examples of Tibet and Ukraine, noted that, "Not only will an agreement with a dictatorship not guarantee that tanks will not roll in, it might even serve as an excuse for invasion."

== Development of bilateral relations ==
Even as India's own relations with the PRC have developed substantially in recent years, India has sought to gradually develop better commercial, cultural and scientific co-operation with Taiwan, albeit whilst ruling out the possibility of establishing formal diplomatic relations Taiwan has also viewed India's rising geopolitical standing as a counterbalance to the PRC's dominance in the region.

As a part of its "Look East" foreign policy, India has sought to cultivate extensive ties with Taiwan in trade and investment as well as developing co-operation in science & technology, environment issues and people-to-people exchanges. Both sides have aimed to develop ties, partly to counteract Chinese rivalry with both nations.

The India-Taipei Association was established in Taipei in 1995 to promote non-governmental interactions between India and Taiwan, and to facilitate business, tourism, scientific, cultural and people-to-people exchanges. The India-Taipei Association has also been authorised to provide all consular and passport services. The Taipei Economic and Cultural Centre in New Delhi is ITA's counterpart organisation in India. A Taipei Economic and Cultural in Chennai was established in 2012. It represents Taiwan government's interests in the southern states of India, as well as Sri Lanka and the Maldives.

In 1999 Narendra Modi visited Taiwan during his tenure as the BJP's General Secretary.

In 2002, the two sides began discussing the possibility of entering into agreements related to Double Taxation Avoidance. In 2007, Ma Ying-jeou, the leader of the Kuomintang, Taiwan's largest political party, and a major candidate in the 2008 presidential elections made an unofficial visit to India. Effective 15 August 2015, Republic of China passport holders can avail of India's e-Tourist Visa facility.

India–Taiwan relations has seen growth under the Narendra Modi led government as in April 2021 Taiwan sent 150 oxygen machines to India to help with a shortage during the COVID-19 pandemic. The oxygen machines had been purchased by the Taiwanese government and modified for India's electrical voltage.

India and Taiwan signed a bilateral investment agreement (BIA) in 2002, which came into effect in 2005. An updated BIA was signed by the two sides in December 2018. India and Taiwan also signed an AEO Mutual Recognition Agreement, a customs mutual assistance agreement, and ATA Carnet.

=== Tsai administration ===
Under the Tsai Ing-wen administration under the Democratic Progressive Party, Taiwan has generally worked to reduce its economic reliance with mainland China by diversifying its number of partners and allies in Asia, pursuing a "New Southbound Policy" concurrent to Modi's Look East policy. In recent years, Taiwanese and Indian officials, along with a considerable number of netizens from their respective countries, have also actively supported each other through the Milk Tea Alliance, which seeks to rally citizens from Asian nations against common threats of authoritarianism.

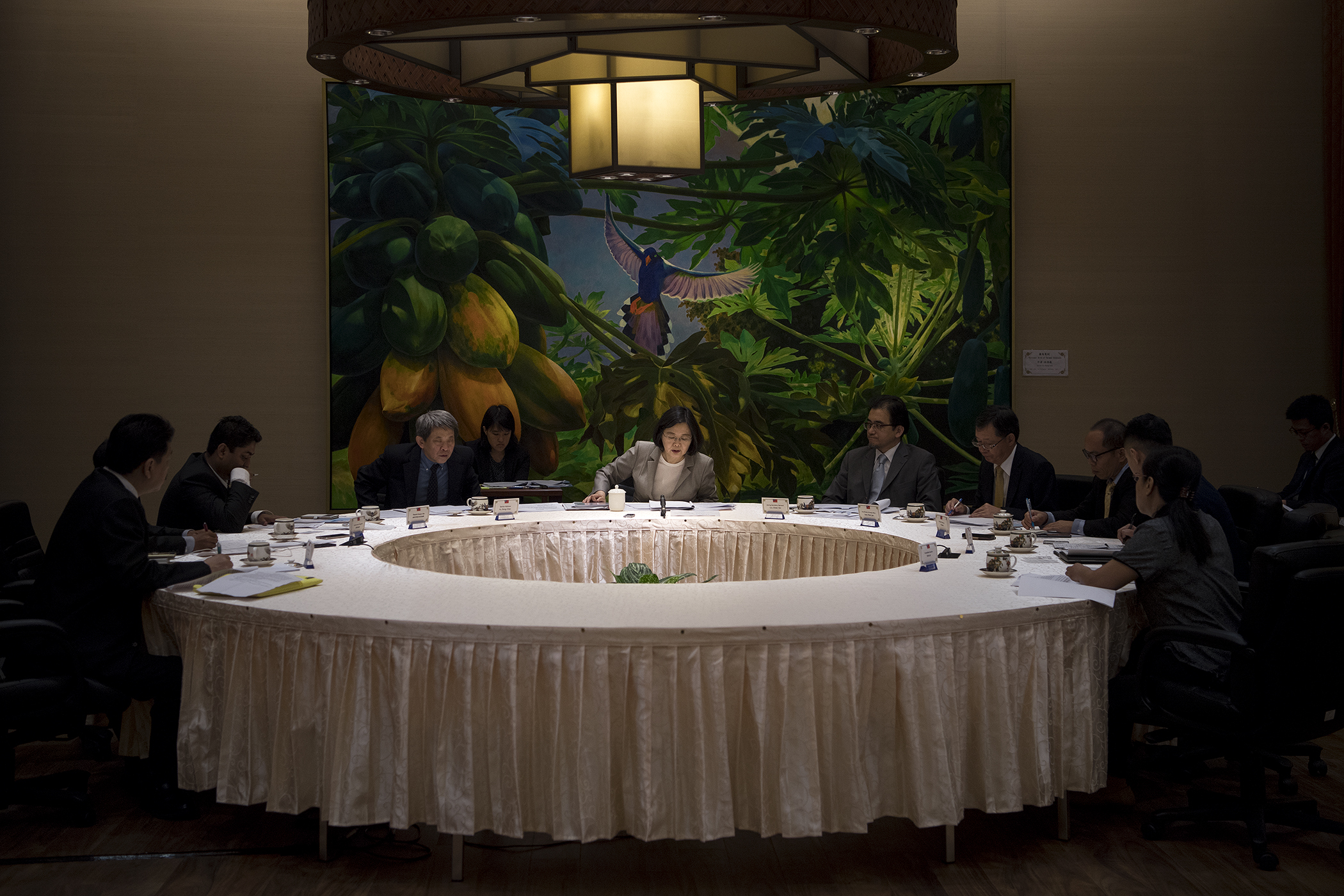
Taiwanese President Tsai Ing-wen was interviewed by media from India and other countries in 2017

Some Taiwanese media outlets, especially those affiliated with the DPP, have also expressed moral support for India during its disputes with China. On 20 June 2017, the official Facebook account of Liberty Times posted in Chinese, "Still the same words: Go India!" in support of India in its 2017 border standoff with China. In June 2020, after another border clash between Chinese and Indian forces, Taiwan News posted a widely shared image of the Indian deity Rama slaying a Chinese dragon on its website as its "Photo of the Day". On 17 October 2020, Taiwan Insider at Radio Taiwan International posted a YouTube video expressing gratitude for India's support for Taiwan, noting that RTI's recent online coverage of Taiwan National Day received a "disproportionate amount of support from users from India".

On 7 October 2020, after the Chinese government warned the Indian media to strictly adhere to the One China Policy, ROC Foreign Minister Joseph Wu tweeted: "#India is the largest democracy on Earth with a vibrant press & freedom-loving people. But it looks like communist #China is hoping to march into the subcontinent by imposing censorship. #Taiwan's Indian friends will have one reply: GET LOST!" On 11 October 2020, Taiwanese President Tsai Ing-Wen tweeted, "Thank you to all of our dear friends in India for your well wishes on #TaiwanNationalDay. Together, we can take pride in safeguarding our shared values like freedom & human rights, & defending our democratic way of life. #namaste".

Several days later on 13 October, Tsai also tweeted, "#Namaste to our friends from #India ! Thank you for following me here. Your warm regards remind me of fond memories from time spent in your incredible country, your architectural marvels, vibrant culture & kind people are truly unforgettable. I miss my time there dearly." On 16 October 2020, Wu Yu-chin, the DPP-affiliated chairwoman of the Taiwan-India Parliamentary Friendship Association commented that, "To be sure, China's relations with India have been tense. Conversely, Taiwan-India relations have been steadily improving....even Taiwanese investments in India have seen growth." In November 2020, Narendra Modi stated that Taiwan and India should strive to be as "inseparable as the body and the soul" in terms of working together and pursuing mutual cooperation into the future.

In April 2021, according to the ROC Foreign Minister Joseph Wu, after the PRC applied significant pressure on the ROC's diplomatic ally Paraguay to permanently abandon its relations with Taiwan in exchange for vaccine shots (having already successfully pressured many of Taiwan's diplomatic allies in the region to switch recognition to mainland China), India was one of several countries who stepped in to help support the Taiwanese government, sending at least 200,000 Indian-made vaccines to Paraguay as a gift in an effort to offset Chinese influence.

Shortly afterwards, in May 2021, the ROC Foreign Ministry of Affairs sent its first batch of supplies to India, including 150 oxygen generators and 500 oxygen cylinders, and subsequently tweeted, "Love from #Taiwan has arrived in #India. We're working hard to send more. #StayStrongIndia!" Taiwan's support for India generated a tremendous outpour of support from thousands of Indians on social media, some of whom pointed out the stark contrast between Taiwan's significant and timely assistance to comments perceived to be mocking India's pandemic plight from an official Weibo account linked to the PRC's Central Political and Legal Affairs Commission.

In November 2022, Taiwanese Deputy Minister of Economic Affairs Chen Chern-chyi visited India, achieving several tangible outcomes. “India is trying to lure Taiwanese chip manufacturers but this is a time-consuming process and Taiwanese companies will require a lot of convincing,” New Delhi and Taipei are drawing closer economically, strengthening business ties. India has not reaffirmed so called “One China” in decades. Taiwan Actively Participates in a Free and Open Indo-Pacific.

In 2022 Indian diplomats were primarily focused on "three Ts" in regard to Taiwan "Trade, Technology and Tourism."

In 2023, India and Taiwan agreed to sign a memorandum of understanding of importing Indian migrant workers, which caused a protest against it. It was later finished in 2024.

== Commercial ties ==
Both governments have launched efforts to significantly expand bilateral trade and investment, especially in the fields of information technology (IT), energy, telecommunications and electronics. India's trade with Taiwan in the calendar year 2008 registered a total of US$5.34 billion, an increase of 9.5% as compared to 2007. In 2007, bilateral trade between the two sides had risen 80% to reach US$4.8 billion. In 2008, Indian exports to Taiwan declined year-on-year at a rate of -7.8%, to touch US$2.33 billion as compared to US$2.53 billion in 2007.

Taiwanese exports to India in 2008 grew at a rate of 28.41% to reach US$3 billion. In 2008, India recorded a trade deficit of US$669 million with Taiwan, as against a trade surplus of US$159 million in year 2007 Major Indian exports to Taiwan include waste oil, naptha, cereals, cotton, organic chemicals, copper, aluminum and food residues.

In 2019, India - Taiwan trade volume was US$7 billion, growing at a rate of 20% YoY.

Major Taiwanese exports to India include integrated circuits, machinery and other electronic products. India is also keen to attract Taiwanese investment particularly in hi-tech and labour-intensive industries. More than 80 Taiwanese companies and entities currently have a presence in India.

Some of the companies include Hon Hai Precision Industry Co (FoxConn), Sanyang Corporation, Gigabyte Technologies, Continental Engineering, CTCI, Apache and Feng Tay (shoes), Wintek Corporation, Delta Electronics, D-Link, Meita Industrials, Transcend, MediaTek, etc.

Bilateral trade has experienced significant growth in recent years.

== Cultural exchanges ==
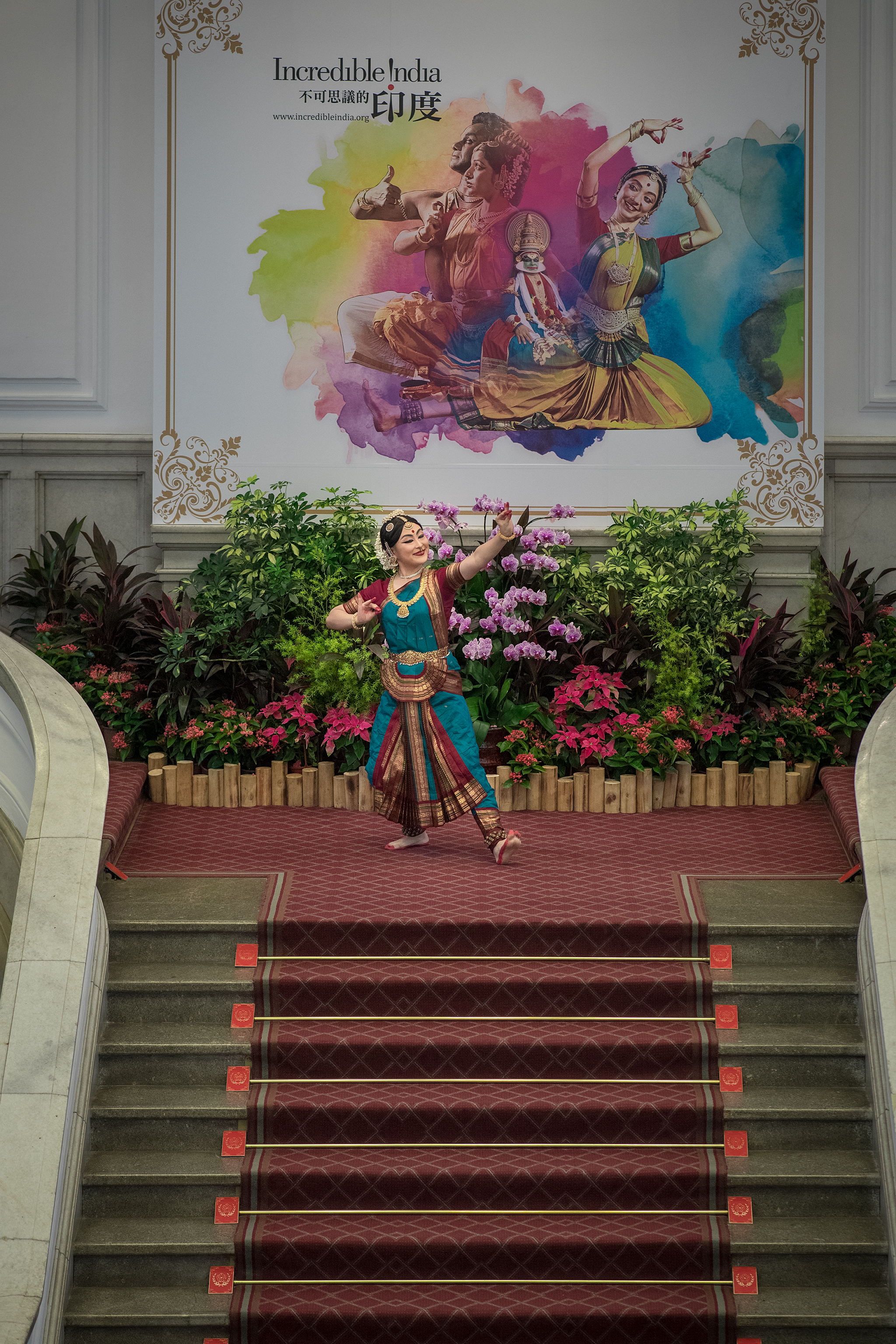
Indian dance performance at Taiwan Presidential Palace as part of Incredible India cultural exchange

While Taiwan and India are two of Asia's leading democracies, both with fairly close ties to the United States and Europe, both sides continue to lack formal diplomatic relations. However, the two governments maintain unofficial ties with each other.

According to some sources, Buddhism is the most widely practiced religion in Taiwan, usually alongside elements of Daoism, and Bollywood films have in recent years gained a reasonably popular following, along with other aspects of Indian culture such as yoga, cuisine and Indian dance.

Cultural exchanges between the two countries have grown significantly.

== Polling ==
According to a 2010 Gallup poll, 21% of Taiwanese people approve of Indian leadership, with 19% disapproving and 60% uncertain. According to a December 2019 survey conducted via National Chengchi University's Election Study Center, 53.8% of Taiwanese people polled overall supported "increasing ties with India", with 73.1% of DPP voters supporting increasing ties with India and 44.6% of KMT voters supporting increasing ties.

== Diplomatic missions ==
Taipei Economic and Cultural Center in India is the representative office of Taiwan in India, functioning as a de facto embassy in the absence of diplomatic relations. There are also Taipei Economic and Cultural Centers in Chennai and Mumbai. The India Taipei Association serves as India's de facto embassy in Taiwan.

== See also ==
- Indians in Taiwan
- Buddhism in Taiwan
