= Indians in Taiwan =

Diasporic community

Total population
- 1,925 · 3,565 (April 2013 · June 2019)

Regions with significant populations
- Taipei City · Taipei: 839 · 1,178
- Hsinchu City · Hsinchu: 326 · 667
- Taipei County · Taichung: 158 · 545

Languages
- Mandarin Chinese · English · Languages of India

Religion
- Hinduism · Sikhism · Islam · Jainism

Related ethnic groups
- People of Indian origin

There is a small community of Indians in Taiwan consisting mainly of immigrants and expatriates from India. As of April 2013, there are about 1,900 Indian residents in Taiwan.

== Overview ==
Indians have been coming to Taiwan since the 1980s — mainly businessmen, jewelers, and scientists. The first Indians to arrive were a community of Sindhi traders. This community used to have around 200 families, but now numbers only 40 or 50 as the majority of them have migrated to China, mainly to Guangzhou. Another similar-sized early group of Indians is made up of families in the diamond and precious stones trade who sell their wares to Taiwanese jewelers.

As a part of its "Look East" foreign policy, India has sought to cultivate extensive ties with Taiwan in trade and investment as well as developing cooperation in science and technology, environment issues and people-to-people exchanges. These exchanges have led to a minor influx of Indians into Taiwan, with small groups of Indian nationals springing up in several locations near the country's larger universities, most notably in Hsinchu and Taipei. Currently, there are almost about 100 Indian scientists alone at the Academia Sinica.

== Education ==
In 2003, figures indicate that only 5 Indian students were enrolled on programmes in Taiwan, growing to 409 in 2007. By 2018, there were 2,398 Indian students studying in Taiwan, showing a 15-year growth of almost 48,000%. The number of Indian students in Taiwan rose by 56% between 2017 and 2018. This was deemed, according to the Taiwan Ministry of Education, as being due to a combination of low tuition fees in the country and easier availability of post-study work permits to foreign graduates.

== Culture ==
Yoga, Indian fashion and dance are popular among many the ethnic Indians living in the country. Ayurvedic spas are cropping up in big hotels and beauty salons nationwide and there are also many Indian restaurants across the country. Many Indian festivals such as Diwali and Holi are celebrated by the Indian community in Taiwan.

== See also ==
- India – Republic of China relations
- India–Taiwan relations
- Indians in China
