= Taipei Economic and Cultural Center, Mumbai =

Political representative office in Mumbai, India

Taipei Economic and Cultural Center in Mumbai 駐孟買臺北經濟文化辦事處
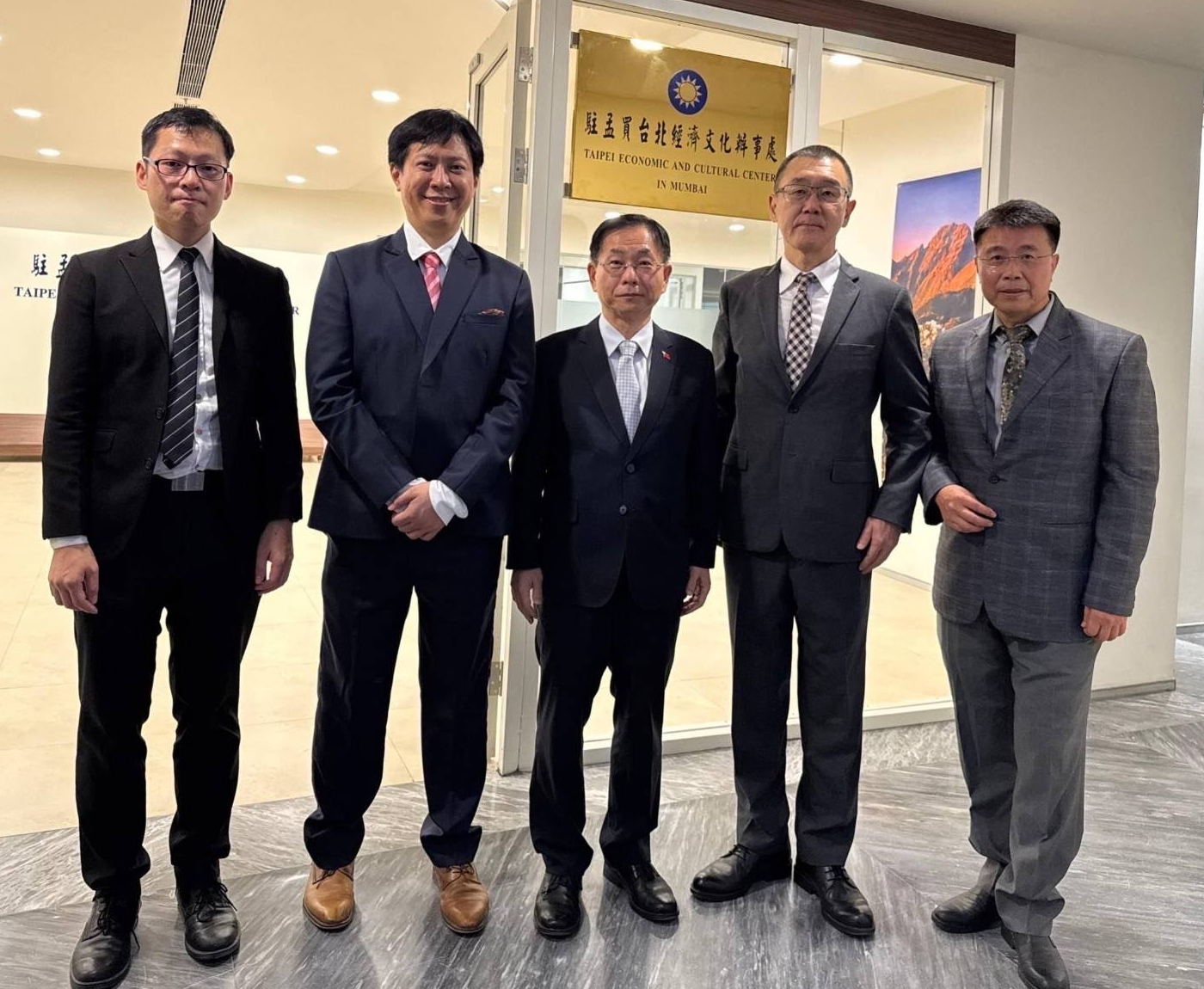

Agency overview
- Formed: 16 October 2024
- Jurisdiction: India: Maharashtra, Goa, Gujarat, Madhya Pradesh, and Dadra and Nagar Haveli and Daman and Diu; Maldives
- Headquarters: 401, Platina Building, G-Block, Bandra Kurla Complex, Bandra East, Mumbai, Maharashtra
- Agency executive: Chang Chun-yu, Director-General
- Website: Official website

Taipei Economic and Cultural Center in Mumbai (Chinese: 駐孟買臺北經濟文化辦事處) is the consulate general-level office, which functions as the de facto consulate of the Republic of China (Taiwan) in Mumbai, India.

== Background ==
The aim of the representative office is to further bilateral cooperation between India and Taiwan in the fields of economics, culture, education and research. In addition, it offers consular services and the consular jurisdiction of the office also extends to the Indian states of Maharashtra, Goa, Gujarat, Madhya Pradesh, and the Indian Union Territory of Dadra and Nagar Haveli and Daman and Diu, and also country of Maldives.

== Opening of the office ==
On 5 July 2023, Ministry of Foreign Affairs of the Republic of China announced the establishment of the office, aiming to replicate the success of the office in Chennai which was set up in July 2012 and attracted about 60% of Taiwanese businesses to invest in South India, benefiting Chennai and South India in general. In September 2023, Chang Chun-yu took office as the first director, with the office location selected and preparations underway. The Mumbai office was officially inaugurated and began operations on 16 October 2024. The opening of the office was attended by over 100 attendees including the head of the Taipei Economic and Cultural Center in India Baushuan Ger and former Indian MP Sujeet Kumar. In a pre-recorded video at the office's inauguration, Minister of Foreign Affairs of Republic of China Lin Chia-lung stated that the opening of the office "showcases the results of Taiwan’s New Southbound Policy and India's Act East policy in fostering greater interaction."

In response to opening of the office, Ministry of Foreign Affairs of the People's Republic of China spokesperson Mao Ning stated in a press briefing that "China opposes moves by any countries it has ties with to engage in official contacts with Taiwan" and that "one-China principle is a serious political commitment made by the Indian side and the political foundation of Sino-Indian relations." She also stated that China has lodged solemn representations with India regarding the opening of the office.

== Heads ==
Heads of the Taipei Economic and Cultural Center in Mumbai:

1. Chang Chun-yu, since October 16, 2024

== See also ==
- India–Taiwan relations
- List of diplomatic missions of Taiwan
- List of diplomatic missions in India
