= List of diplomatic missions in India =

The Republic of India hosts 166 embassies/high commissions in its capital, New Delhi. Its major cities, such as Mumbai, Kolkata, Chennai, & Bengaluru, are host to career consulates. Most of these diplomatic missions in Delhi are located in Chanakyapuri, Vasant Vihar, Anand Niketan, and Shanti Niketan. In January 2017, the Union Council of Ministers approved Dwarka Sector 24 to be a second Diplomatic Enclave for 39 countries on 34.87 ha (86.2 acres) of area, after Chanakyapuri.

This listing does not include honorary consulates.

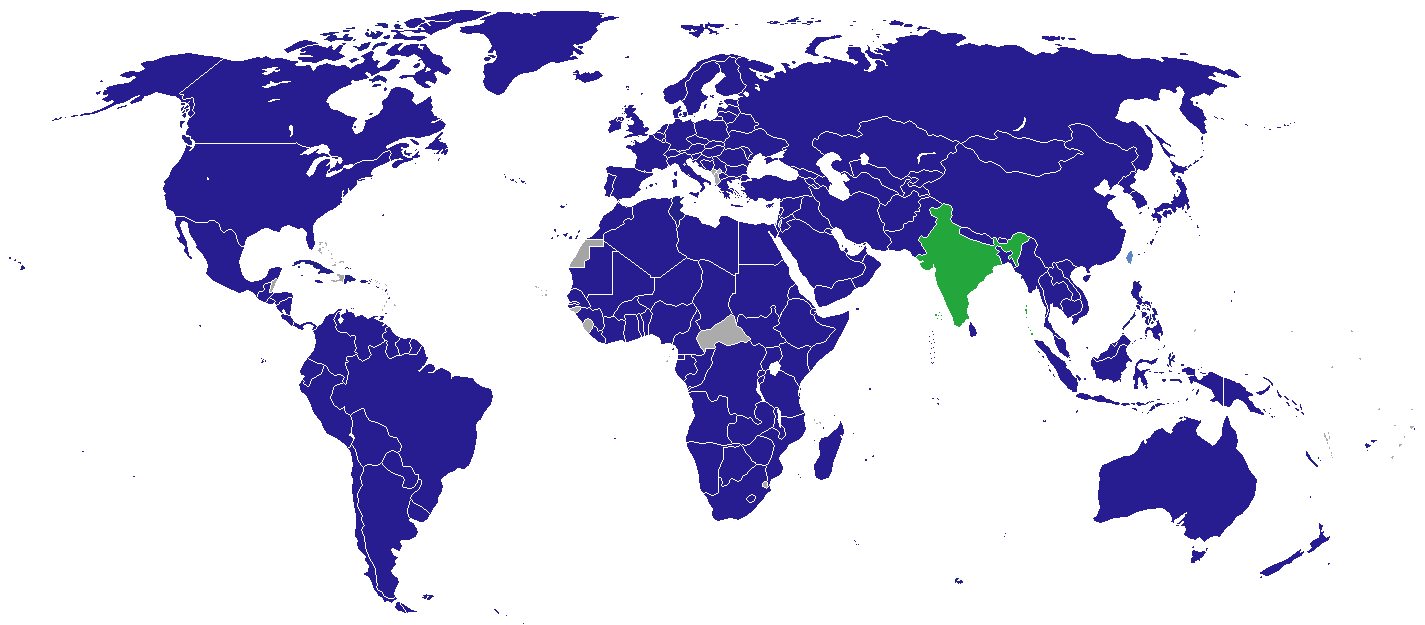
Map of diplomatic missions in India

== Diplomatic missions in New Delhi ==
=== Embassies/High Commissions ===
1. Afghanistan
2. Algeria
3. Angola
4. Argentina
5. Armenia
6. Australia
7. Austria
8. Azerbaijan
9. Bahrain
10. Bangladesh (High Commission)
11. Belarus
12. Belgium (Embassy)
13. Benin
14. Bhutan
15. Bolivia
16. Bosnia and Herzegovina
17. Botswana
18. Brazil
19. Brunei
20. Bulgaria
21. Burkina Faso
22. Burundi
23. Cambodia
24. Cameroon
25. Canada
26. Chad
27. Chile
28. China (Embassy)
29. Colombia
30. Congo-Brazzaville
31. Congo-Kinshasa
32. Costa Rica
33. Croatia
34. Cuba
35. Cyprus
36. Czechia
37. Denmark
38. Djibouti
39. Dominican Republic
40. Ecuador
41. Egypt
42. El Salvador
43. Equatorial Guinea
44. Eritrea
45. Estonia
46. Eswatini
47. Ethiopia
48. Fiji
49. Finland
50. France
51. Gabon
52. Gambia
53. Georgia
54. Germany
55. Ghana
56. Greece
57. Guatemala
58. Guinea
59. Guyana
60. Holy See (Apostolic Nunciature)
61. Honduras
62. Hungary
63. Iceland
64. Indonesia
65. Iran
66. Iraq
67. Ireland
68. Israel (Embassy)
69. Italy
70. Ivory Coast
71. Jamaica
72. Japan (Embassy)
73. Jordan
74. Kazakhstan
75. Kenya
76. Kuwait
77. Kyrgyzstan
78. Laos
79. Latvia
80. Lebanon
81. Lesotho
82. Liberia
83. Libya
84. Lithuania
85. Luxembourg
86. Madagascar
87. Malawi
88. Malaysia
89. Maldives
90. Mali
91. Malta
92. Mauritania
93. Mauritius
94. Mexico
95. Moldova
96. Mongolia
97. Morocco
98. Mozambique
99. Myanmar
100. Namibia
101. Nauru
102. Nepal
103. Netherlands
104. New Zealand
105. Nicaragua
106. Niger
107. Nigeria
108. North Korea
109. North Macedonia
110. Norway
111. Oman
112. Pakistan (High Commission)
113. Palestine (Embassy)
114. Panama
115. Papua New Guinea
116. Paraguay
117. Peru
118. Philippines
119. Poland
120. Portugal
121. Qatar
122. Romania
123. Russia
124. Rwanda
125. Saint Kitts and Nevis
126. Saudi Arabia
127. Senegal
128. Serbia
129. Seychelles
130. Singapore
131. Slovakia
132. Slovenia
133. Solomon Islands
134. Somalia
135. South Africa
136. South Korea
137. South Sudan
138. Spain
139. Sri Lanka
140. Sudan
141. Suriname
142. Sweden (Embassy)
143. Switzerland
144. Syria
145. Tajikistan
146. Tanzania
147. Thailand (Embassy)
148. Timor-Leste
149. Togo
150. Trinidad and Tobago
151. Tunisia
152. Turkey (Embassy)
153. Turkmenistan
154. Uganda
155. Ukraine
156. United Arab Emirates
157. United Kingdom (High Commission)
158. United States (Embassy)
159. Uruguay
160. Uzbekistan
161. Vanuatu
162. Venezuela
163. Vietnam
164. Yemen
165. Zambia
166. Zimbabwe

=== Other missions or delegations ===
- European Union (Delegation)
- Kosovo (Liaison Office)
- Sahrawi Arab Democratic Republic (Representative Office)
- Taiwan (Economic and Cultural Center)
- UNHCR (Delegation)

== Consular missions ==
The following cities host career consular missions. All entries are consulates-general unless otherwise noted.

Agartala, Tripura

1. Bangladesh (Assistant High Commission)

Ahmedabad, Gujarat

1. United Kingdom (Deputy High Commission)

Bengaluru, Karnataka

1. Australia
2. Canada
3. Denmark
4. France
5. Germany (Consulate General)
6. Italy
7. Israel (Consulate General)
8. Japan
9. Netherlands
10. Switzerland
11. United Kingdom (Deputy High Commission)
12. United States

Chandigarh, Haryana/Punjab

1. Canada
2. United Kingdom (Deputy High Commission)

Chennai, Tamil Nadu

1. Australia
2. Bangladesh (Deputy High Commission)
3. France (Bureau de France)
4. Germany (Consulate General)
5. Japan
6. Malaysia (Consulate General)
7. Russia (Consulate General)
8. Singapore
9. South Korea (Consulate General)
10. Sri Lanka (Deputy High Commission)
11. Taiwan (Economic and Cultural Center)
12. Thailand (Consulate General)
13. United Kingdom (Deputy High Commission)
14. United States (Consulate General)

Guwahati, Assam

1. Bangladesh (Assistant High Commission)
2. Bhutan

Hyderabad, Telangana

1. Afghanistan
2. Iran
3. Turkey
4. United Arab Emirates
5. United Kingdom (Deputy High Commission)
6. United States (Consulate General)

Kolkata, West Bengal

1. Australia
2. Bangladesh (Deputy High Commission)
3. Bhutan
4. China
5. France
6. Germany
7. Italy
8. Japan
9. Myanmar
10. Nepal
11. Russia
12. Thailand
13. United Kingdom (Deputy High Commission)
14. United States (Consulate General)

Mumbai, Maharashtra

1. Afghanistan
2. Argentina
3. Australia
4. Bahrain
5. Bangladesh
6. Belarus
7. Belgium
8. Brazil
9. Canada
10. Chile
11. China
12. Czechia
13. Egypt
14. Ethiopia
15. Finland
16. France
17. Germany
18. Hungary
19. Indonesia
20. Iran
21. Iraq
22. Ireland
23. Israel
24. Italy
25. Japan
26. Kuwait
27. Malaysia
28. Maldives
29. Mauritius
30. Mexico
31. Netherlands
32. New Zealand
33. Norway
34. Oman
35. Panama
36. Poland
37. Qatar
38. Russia
39. Saudi Arabia
40. Singapore
41. South Africa
42. South Korea
43. Spain
44. Sri Lanka
45. Switzerland
46. Sweden
47. Taiwan (Economic and Cultural Center)
48. Thailand
49. Turkey
50. Ukraine
51. United Arab Emirates
52. United Kingdom (Deputy High Commission)
53. United States (Consulate General)
54. Vietnam
55. Yemen

Panaji, Goa

1. Portugal
2. United Kingdom (Consular office)

Puducherry, Puducherry

1. France

Thiruvananthapuram, Kerala

1. Maldives
2. United Arab Emirates

== Non-resident embassies ==
Resident in Beijing, China

1. Bahamas
2. Barbados
3. Cape Verde
4. Dominica
5. Grenada
6. Micronesia
7. São Tomé and Príncipe
8. Tonga

Resident in Taipei, Taiwan

1. Belize
2. Palau
3. Saint Lucia
4. Saint Vincent and the Grenadines
5. Tuvalu

Resident elsewhere

1. Albania (Ankara)
2. Central African Republic (Kuwait City)
3. Guinea-Bissau (Riyadh)
4. Haiti (Hanoi)
5. Marshall Islands (Tokyo)
6. Montenegro (Baku)
7. Sierra Leone (Abu Dhabi)

== Gallery ==
Embassies/High Commissions

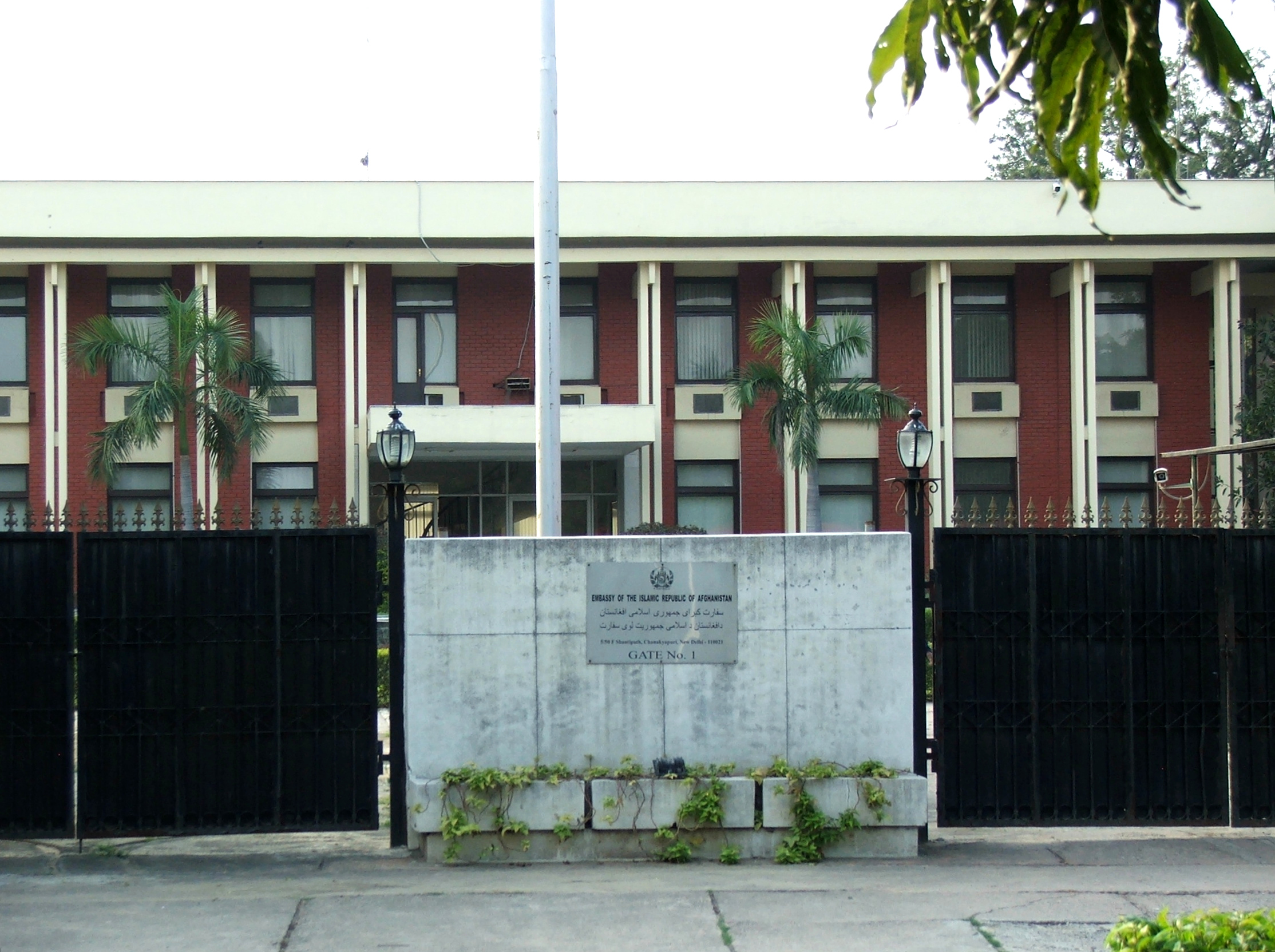
Embassy of Afghanistan

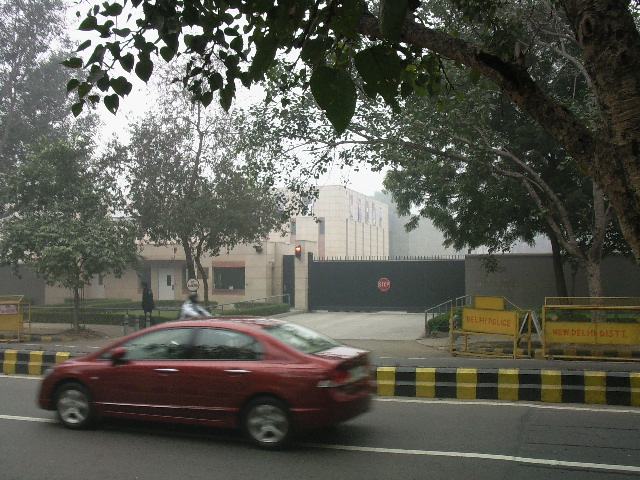
High Commission of Australia

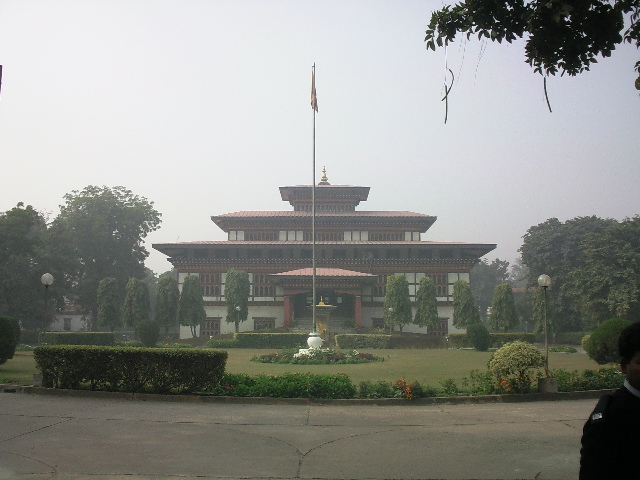
Embassy of Bhutan

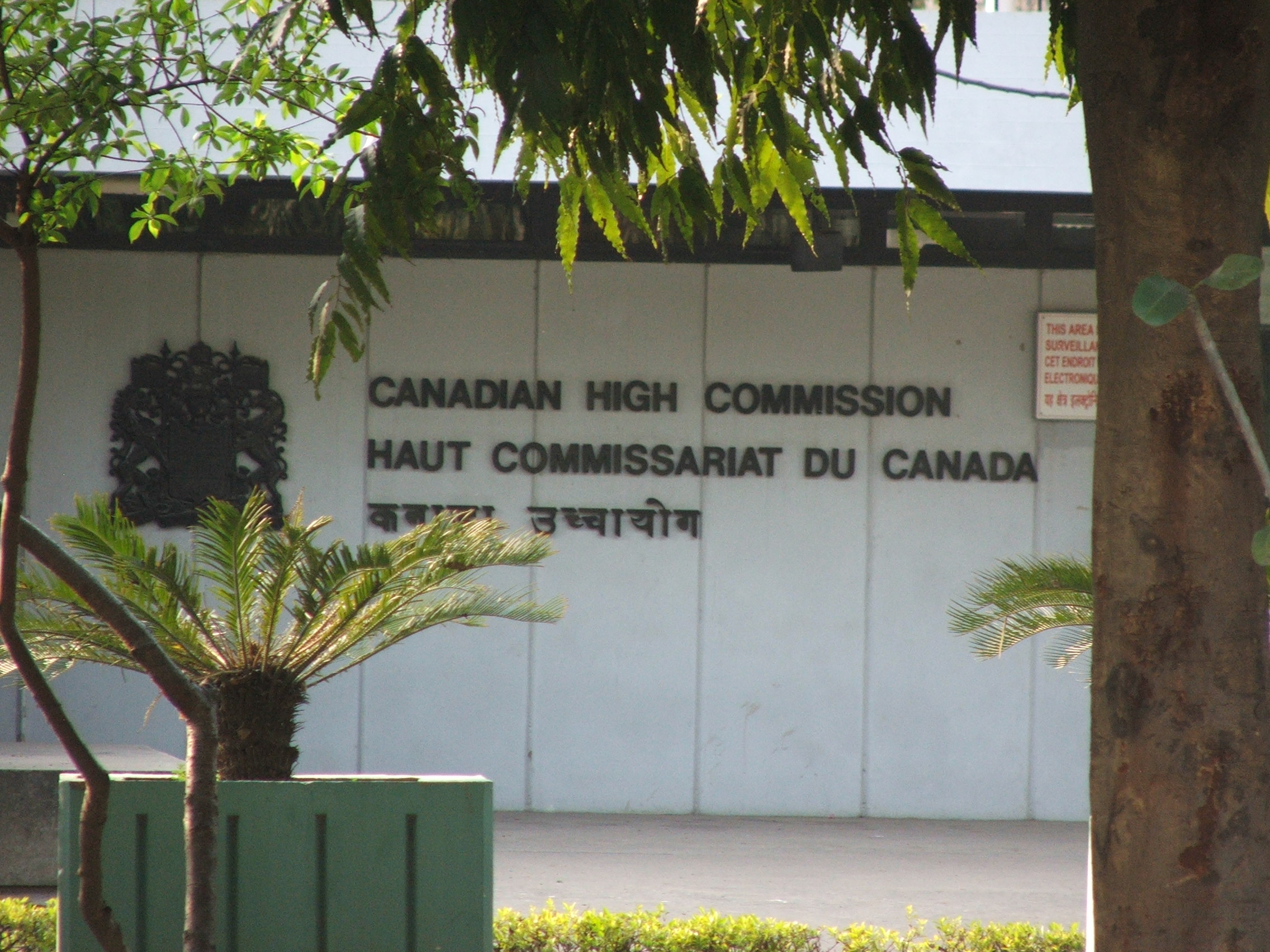
High Commission of Canada

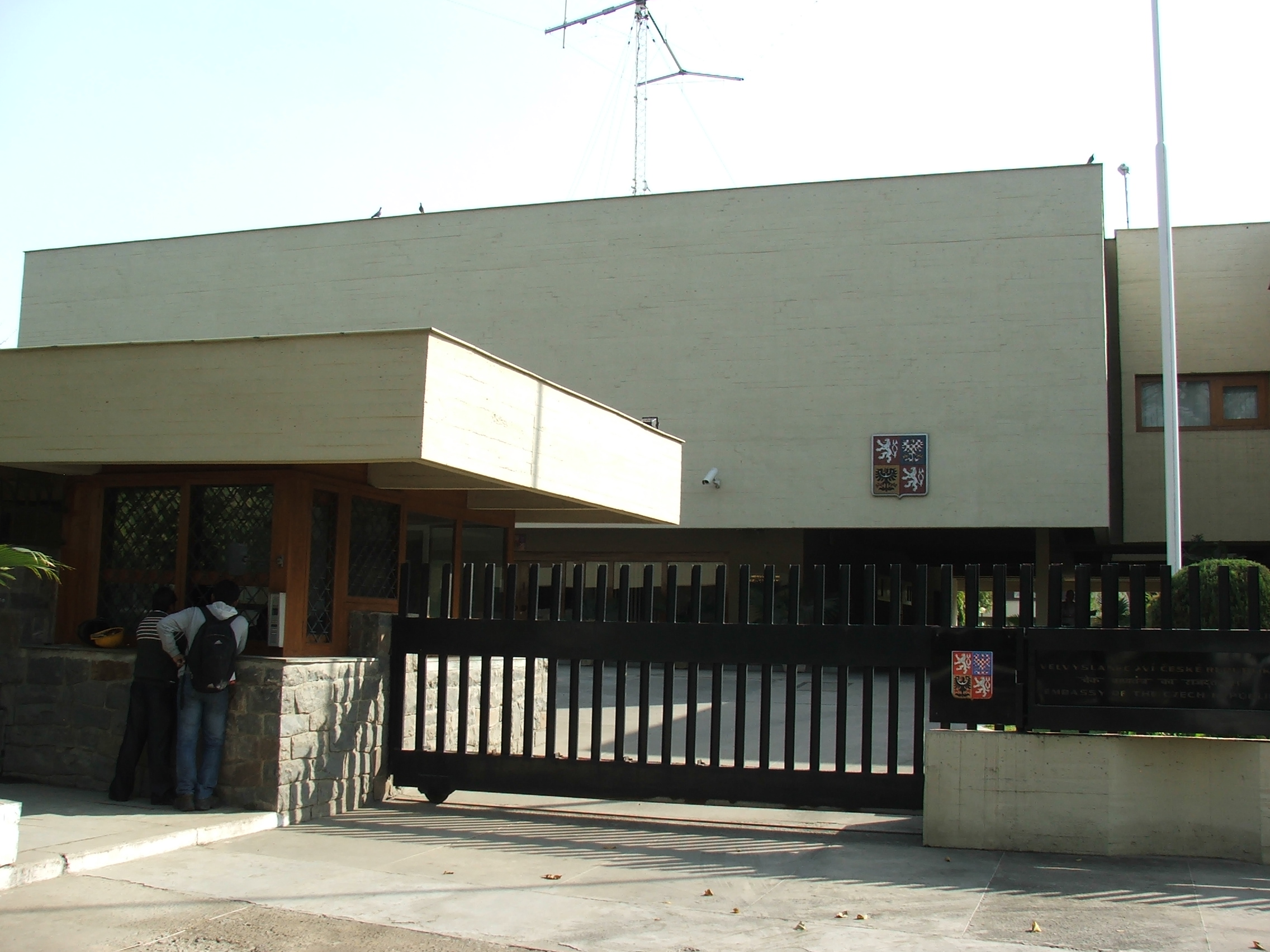
Embassy of the Czech Republic

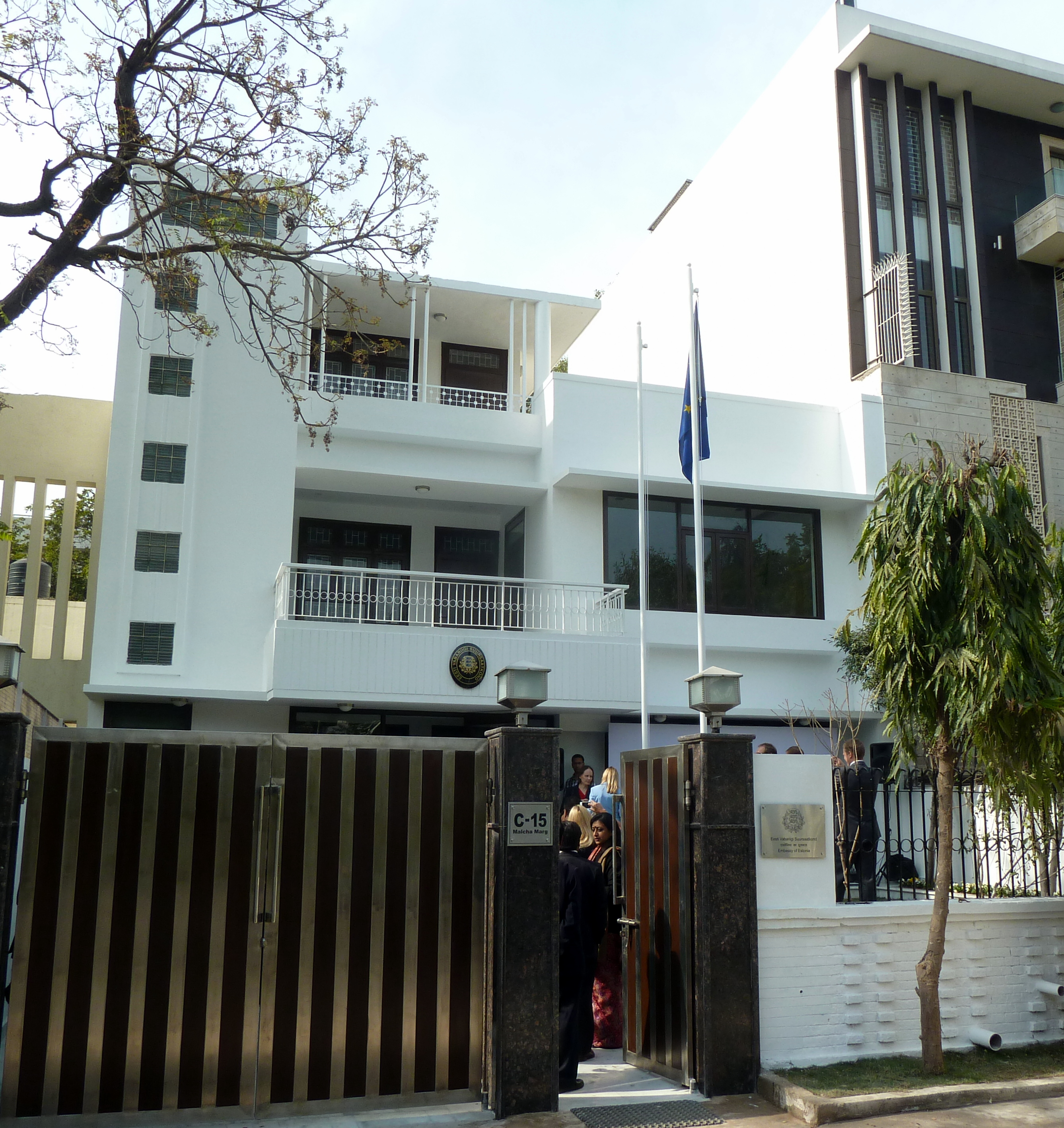
Embassy of Estonia

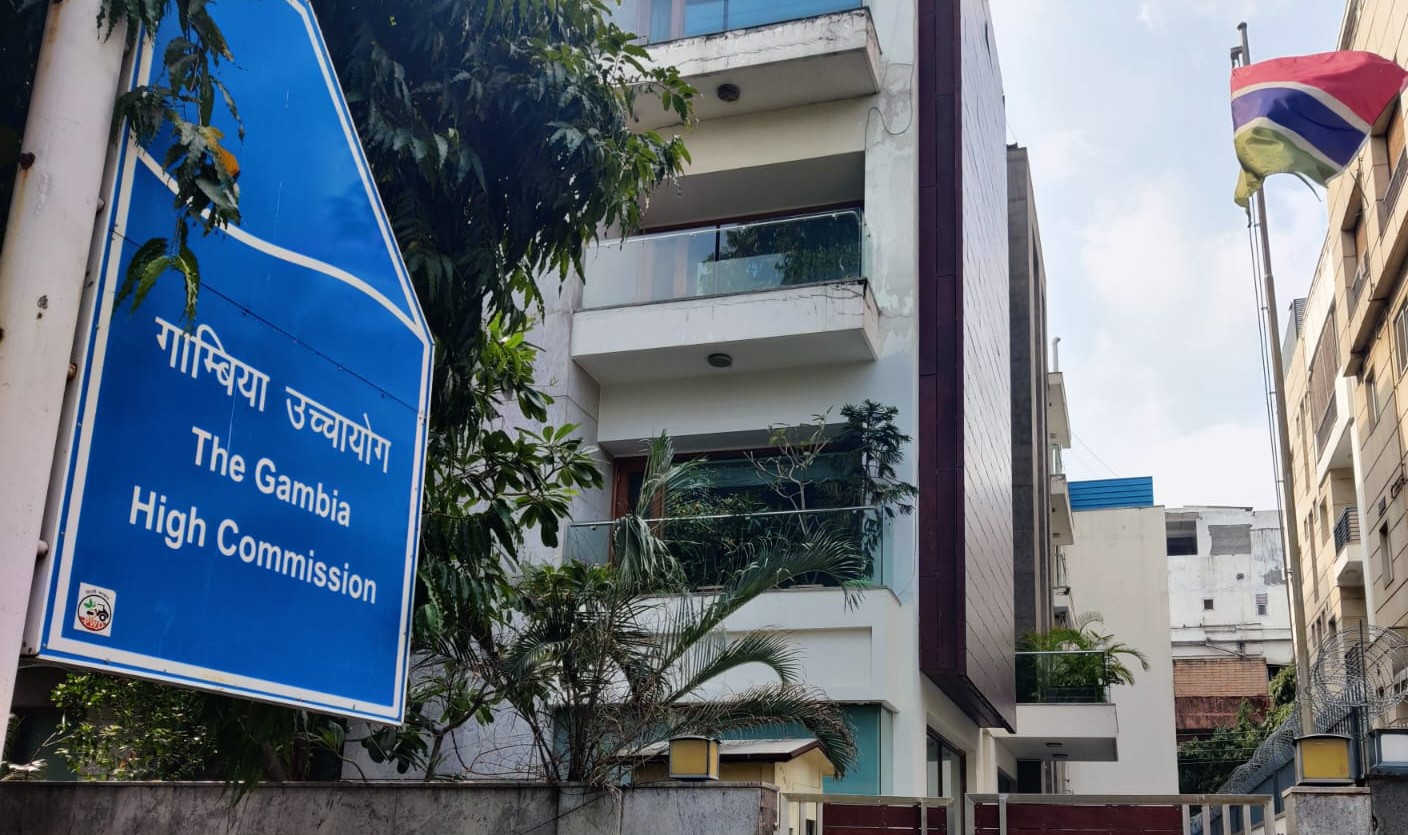
High Commission of The Gambia

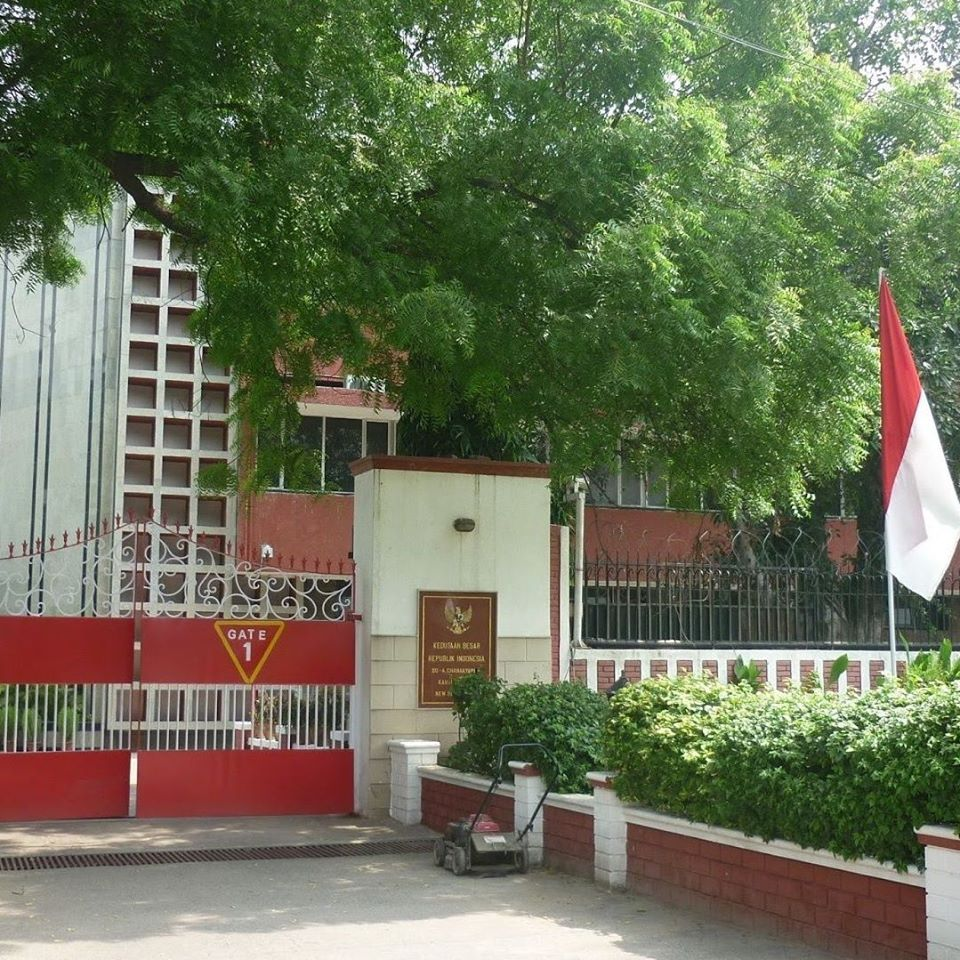
Embassy of Indonesia

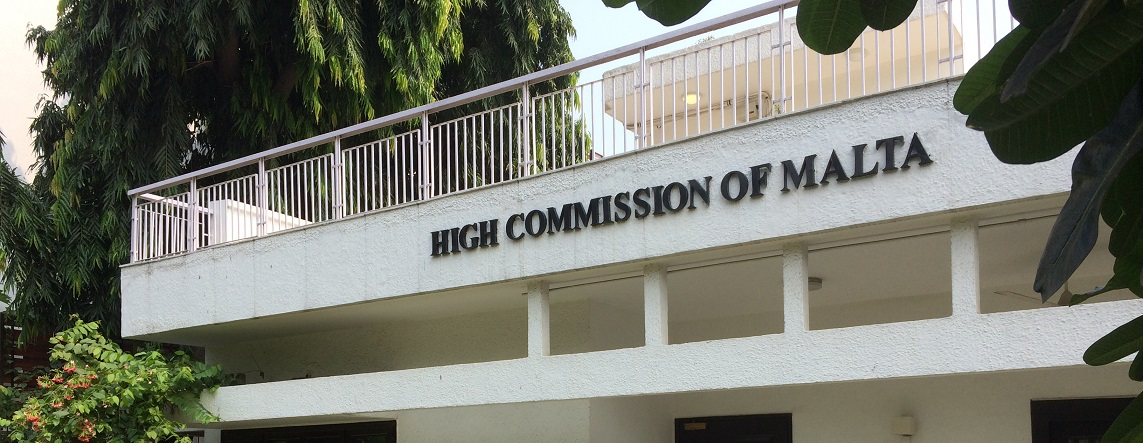
High Commission of Malta

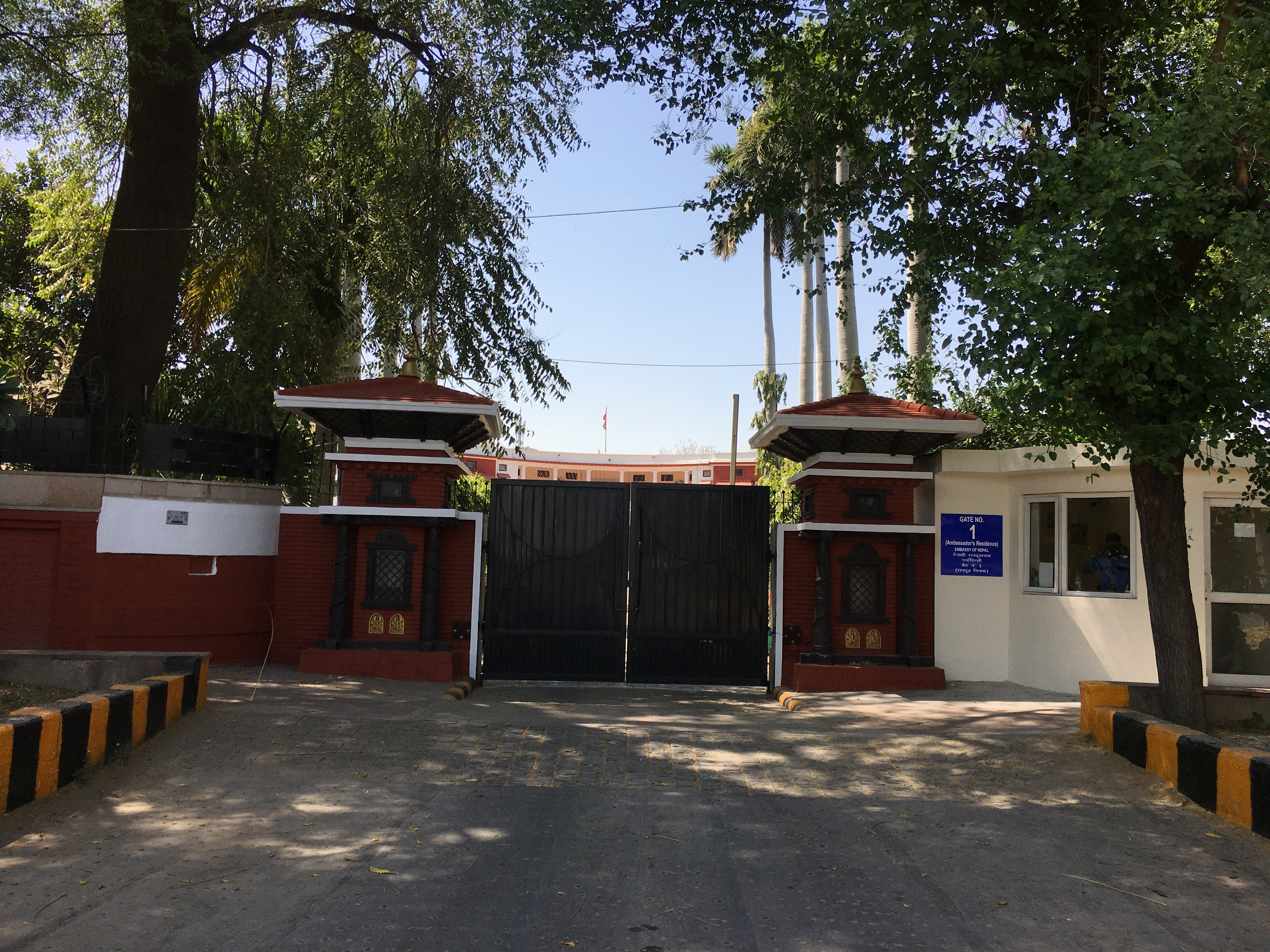
Nepalese Embassy

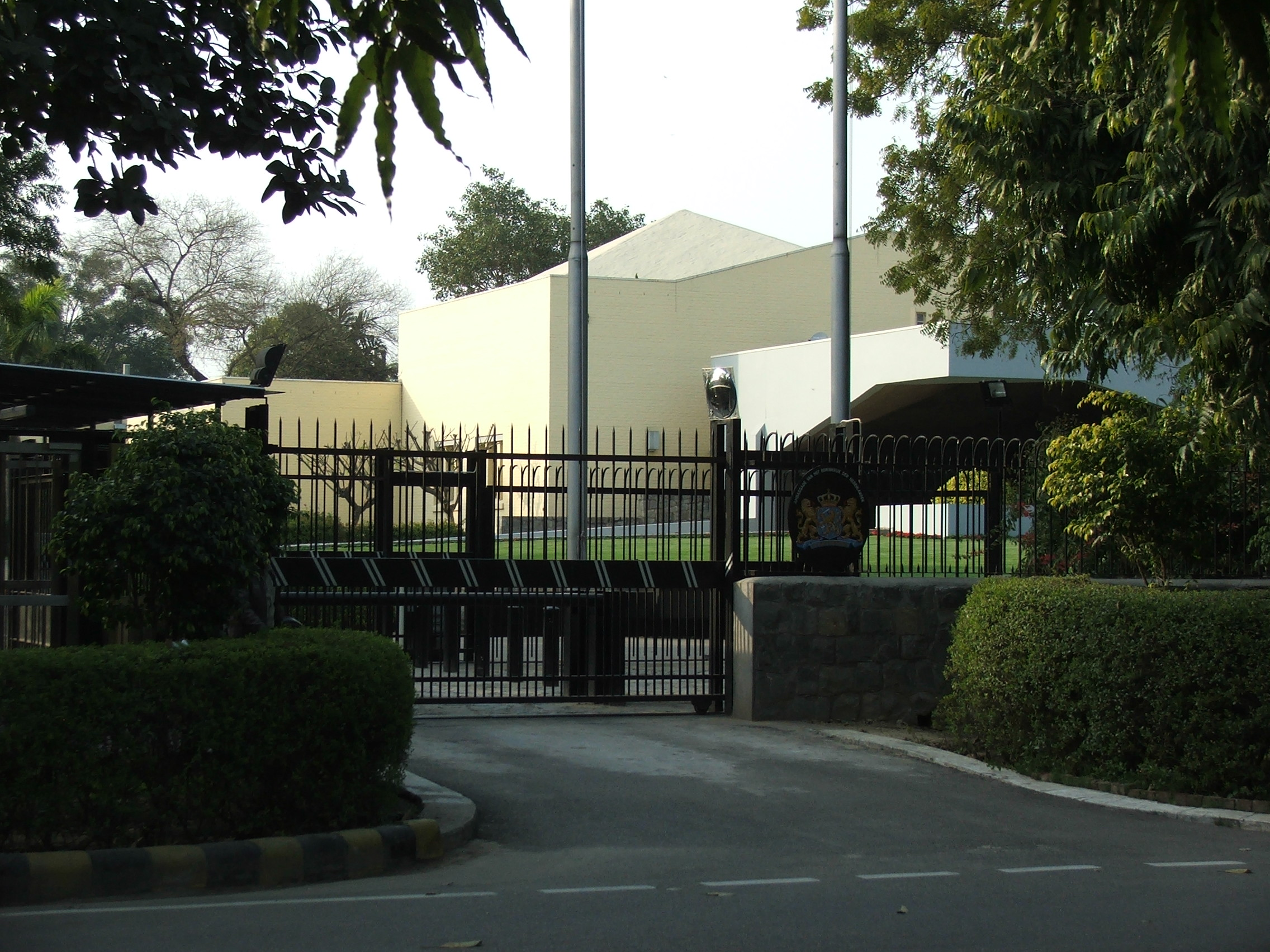
Embassy of the Netherlands

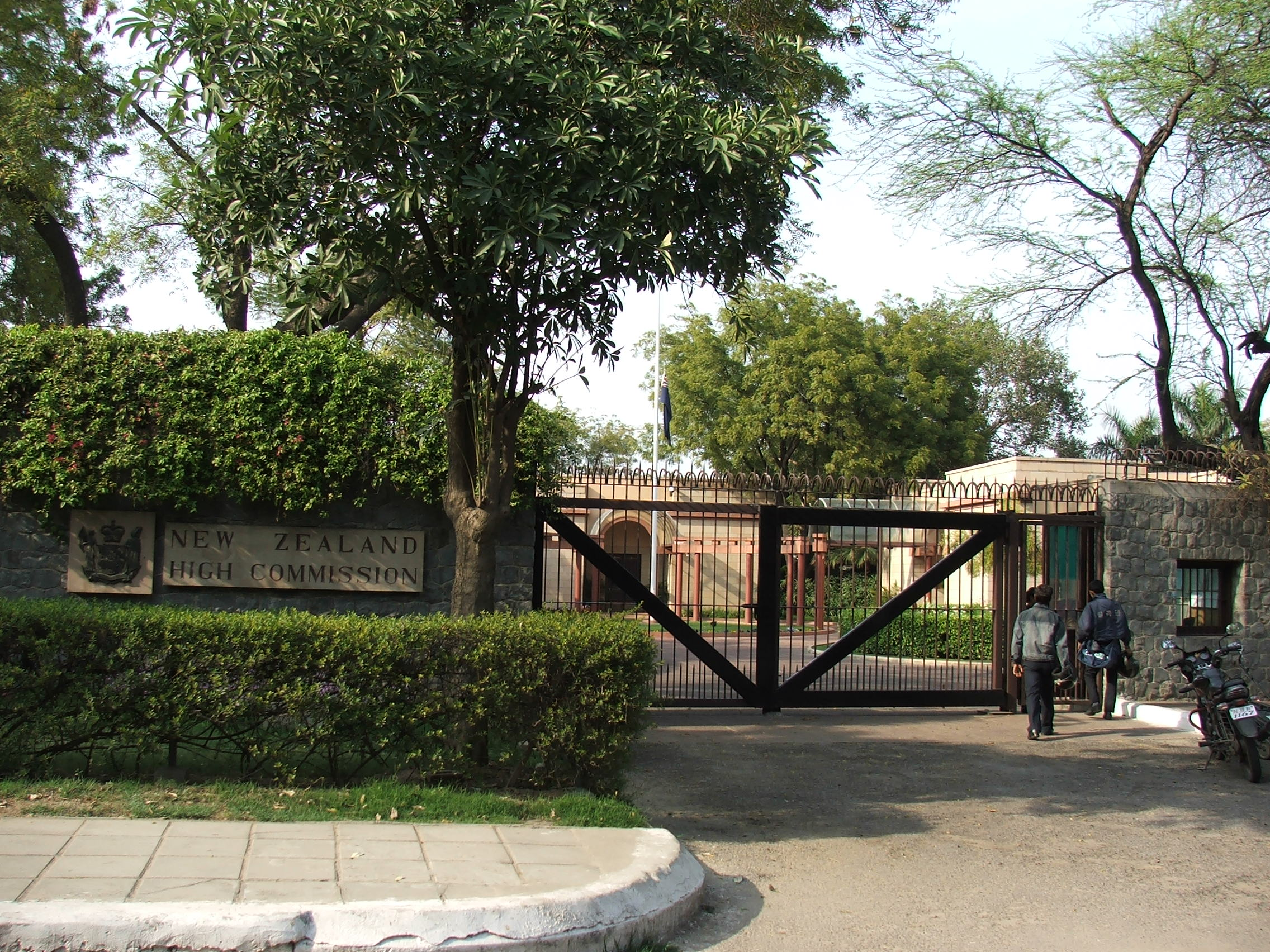
High Commission of New Zealand

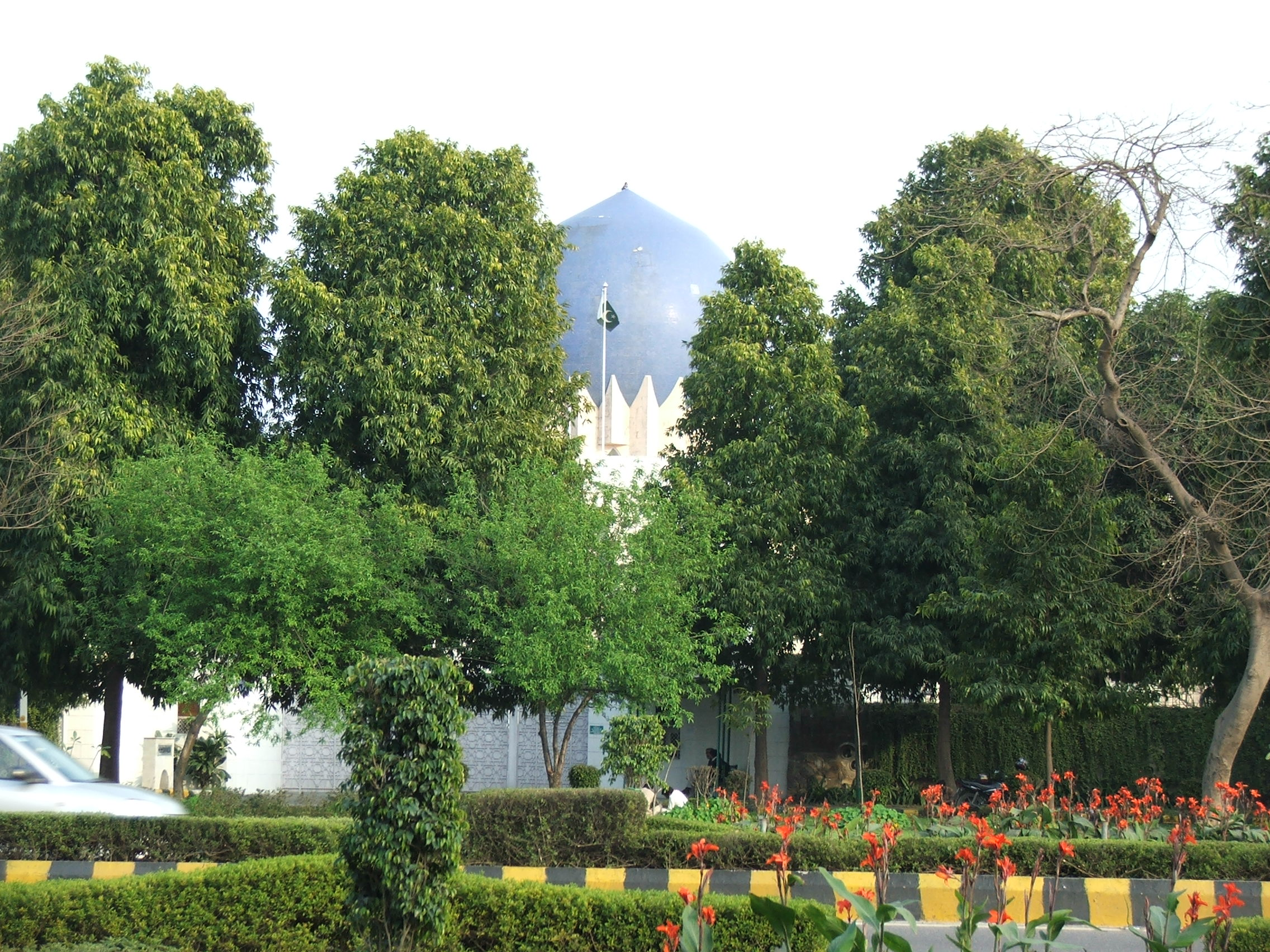
High Commission of Pakistan

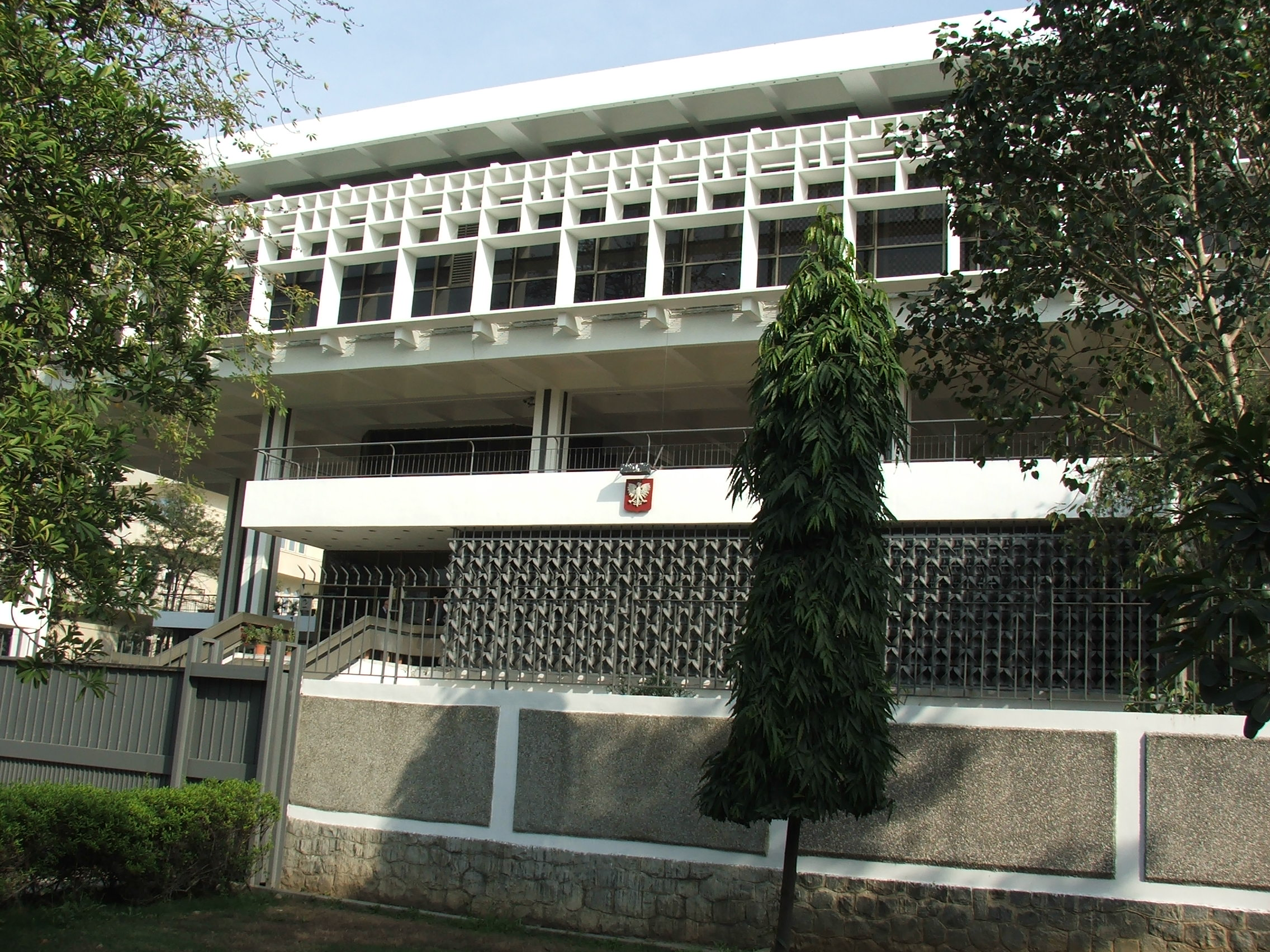
Embassy of Poland

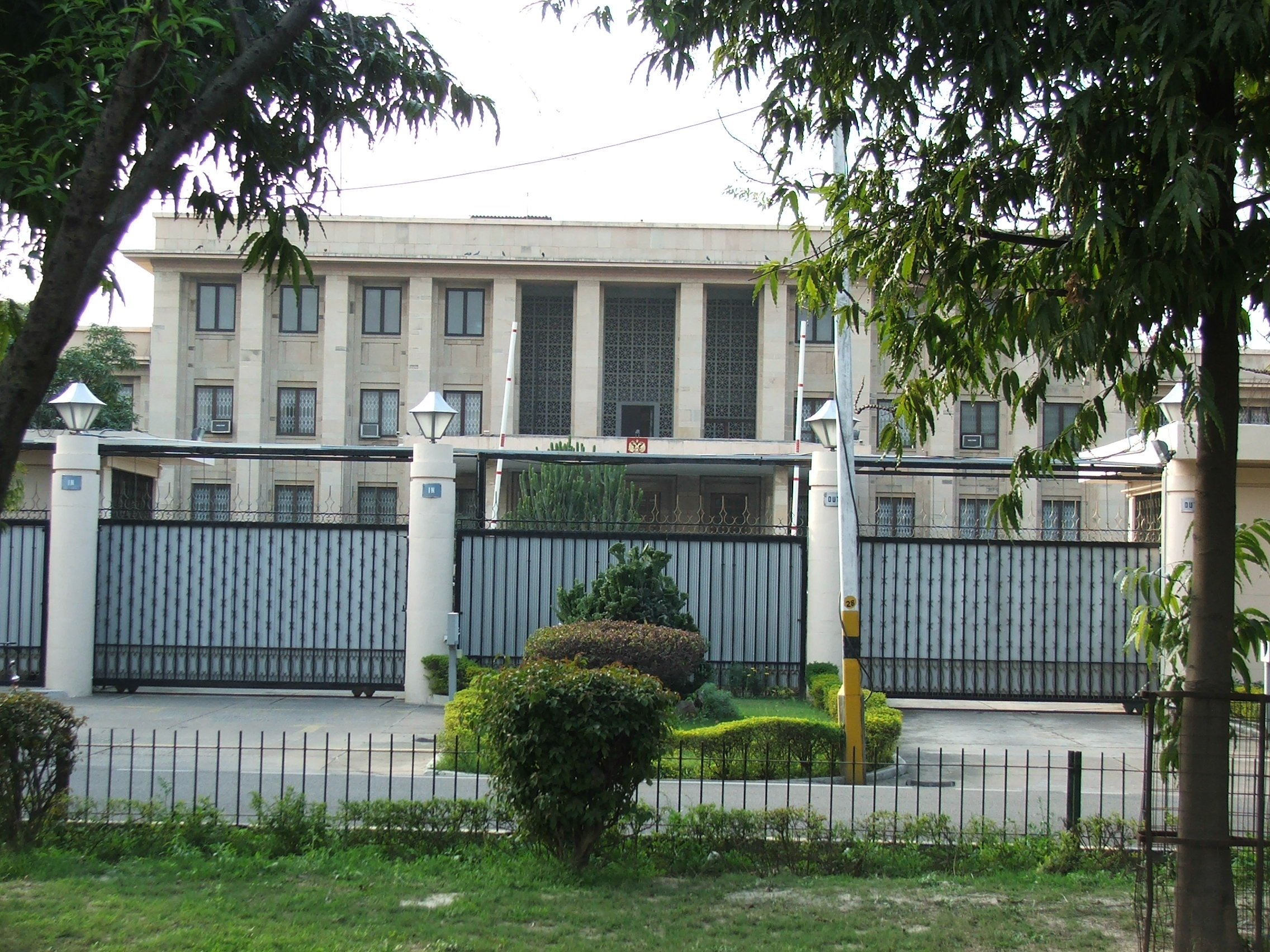
Embassy of Russia

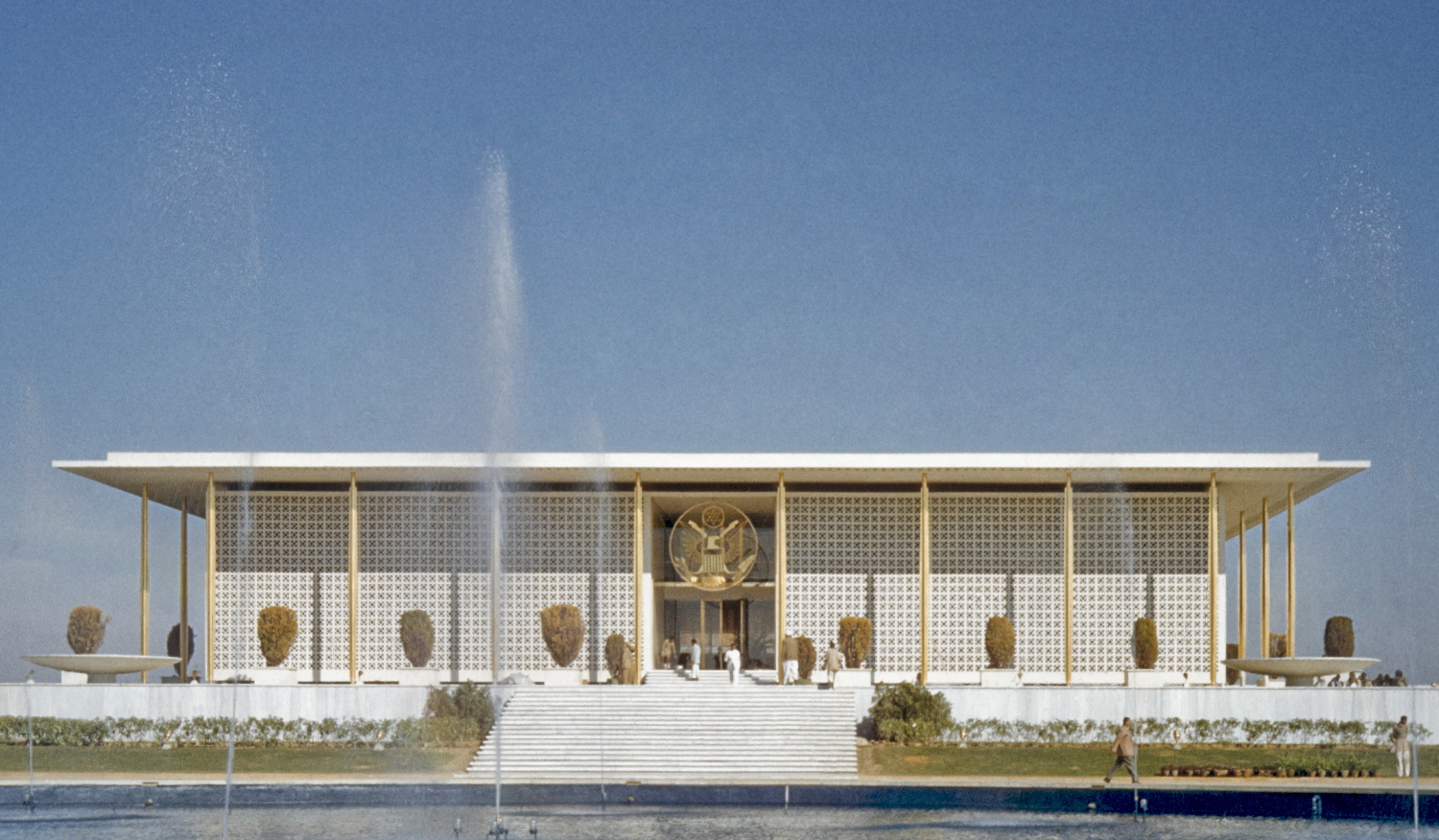
Embassy of the United States

Consulates

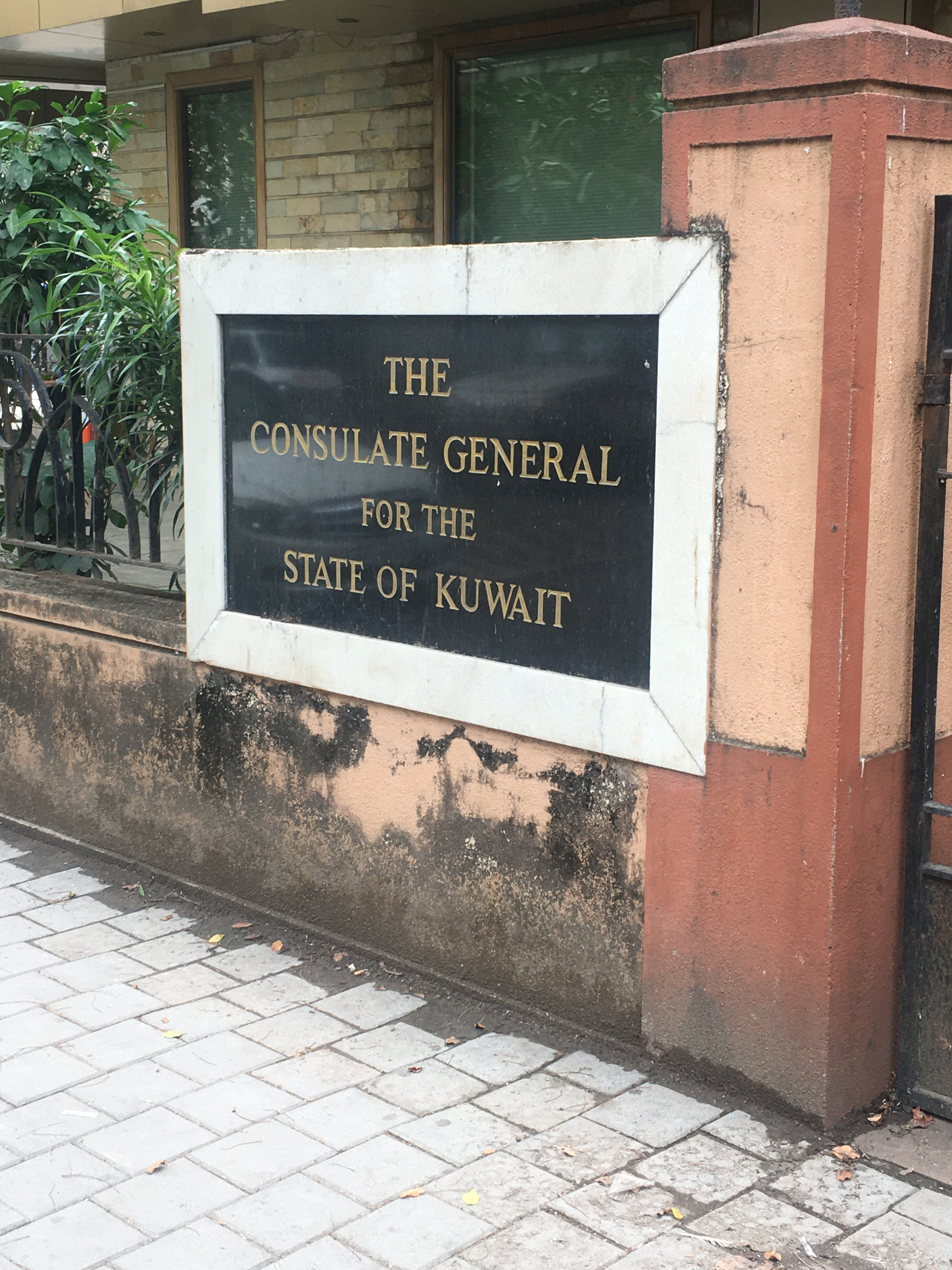
Kuwaiti Consulate (in Mumbai)

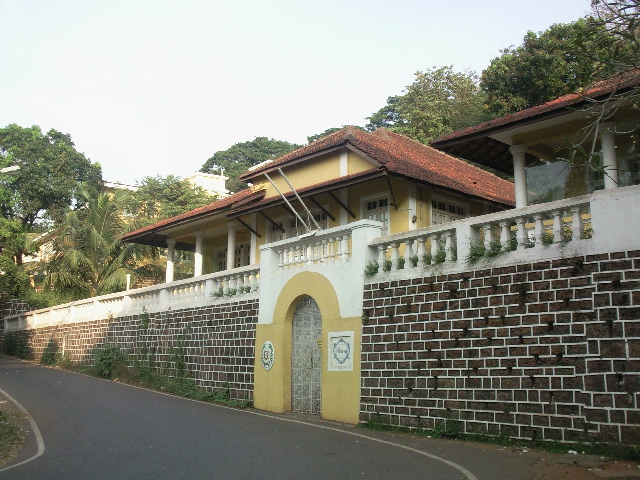
Portuguese Consulate (in Panjim)

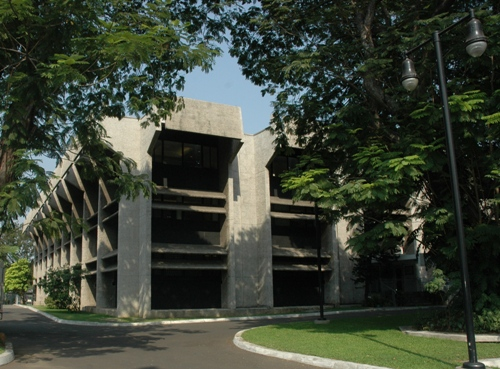
American Consulate (in Chennai)

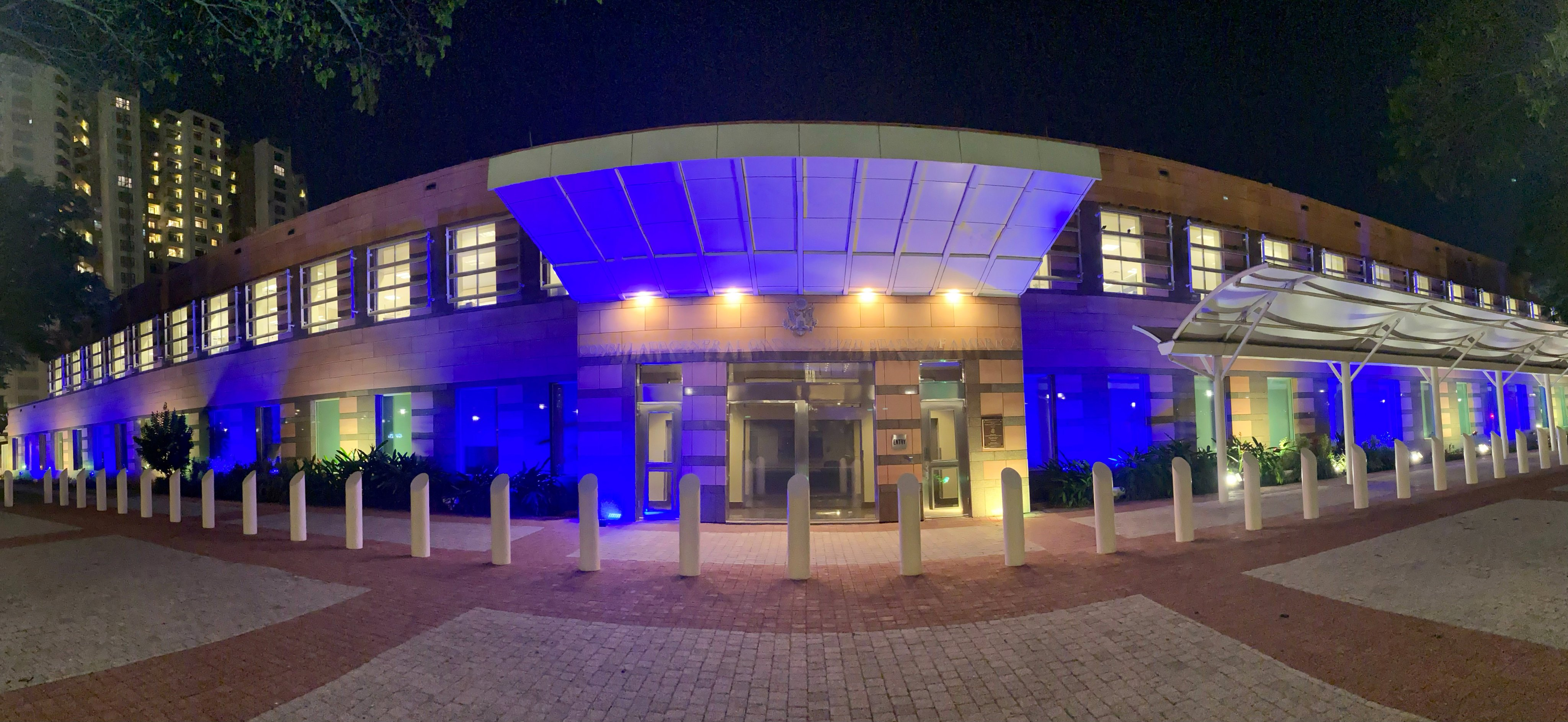
American Consulate (in Mumbai)

== Closed missions ==
Host city	Sending country	Mission	Year closed	Notes	Ref.
Chennai	Belgium	Consulate General	2021		
Kolkata	Poland	Consulate General	1993		
Mumbai	Ecuador	Consulate	2019		
Mumbai	Pakistan	Consulate	1994		
New Delhi	Albania	Embassy	2014	To be re-opened	

== Missions to open ==
Host city	Sending country	Mission	Ref.
New Delhi	Albania	Embassy	
Ahmedabad	United States	Consulate	
Bengaluru	Greece	Consulate	
Bengaluru	Maldives	Consulate	
Bengaluru	Spain	Consulate	
Mumbai	Greece	Consulate	
Mumbai	Tanzania	Consulate	

== See also ==
- Foreign relations of India
- List of diplomatic missions of India
- List of ambassadors and high commissioners of India
- List of ambassadors and high commissioners to India
- Visa policy of India
- Visa requirements for Indian citizens
