= Taipei Economic and Cultural Center, New Delhi =

Taipei Economic and Cultural Center in India
- 駐印度代表處

Agency overview
- Formed: 1995
- Jurisdiction: India (northern states and territories); Bhutan; Nepal; Bangladesh (Note: Joint responsibility for Bangladesh with the TECO Bangkok .)
- Headquarters: New Delhi; Chennai (southern states and territories); Mumbai (upcoming)
- Agency executive: Mumin Chen, Representative
- Website: Official website

The Taipei Economic and Cultural Center in India (Chinese: 駐印度代表處; pinyin: Zhù Yìndù Dàibiǎo Chù) is the representative office of Taiwan in India, functioning as a de facto embassy in the absence of diplomatic relations. It was established in 1995. It is headed by a Representative, currently Baushuan Ger.

The Center is also responsible for relations with Nepal and Bhutan, and has joint responsibility for Bangladesh with the Taipei Economic and Cultural Office in Thailand in Bangkok. Between 2004 and 2009, affairs with Bangladesh were handled by the Taipei Economic and Cultural Office in Bangladesh in Dhaka.

The Taipei Economic and Cultural Center in Chennai was established in 2012, which has responsibility for Sri Lanka and the Maldives, as well as the southern states and territories of India. The Taipei Economic and Cultural Center in Mumbai was established in 2024.

The Center's counterpart body in Taiwan is the India-Taipei Association in Taipei.

== Divisions ==
- Consular Division
- Economic Division
- Education Division
- Science and Technology Division

== Representatives ==
- Tien Chung-kwang (2013–2020)
- Baushuan Ger (2020-2025)
- Mumin Chen (2025-)

== See also ==
- India–Taiwan relations
- Foreign relations of Taiwan
- Foreign relations of India
- List of diplomatic missions of Taiwan
- List of diplomatic missions in India
- Taipei Economic and Cultural Center in Chennai
