= Embassy of Palestine, New Delhi =

Diplomatic mission of Palestine in India

Embassy of the State of Palestine, New Delhi
- Location: New Delhi
- Address: Chanakyapuri
- Ambassador: Abdullah MA ABushawesh
- Jurisdiction: Bhutan; India; Nepal

The Embassy of the State of Palestine in New Delhi is the diplomatic mission of the State of Palestine in India. It is located in Chanakyapuri in New Delhi.

== See also ==
- India–Palestine relations
- Diplomatic missions in India
- Diplomatic missions of the State of Palestine
