= Diplomatic flag =

Flag used by a sovereign state engaging in diplomacy

A diplomatic flag is a flag used by a sovereign state engaging in diplomacy which is different from the nation's normal national flag. Some nations also have personal flags that are used by their diplomatic representatives, such as the U.S. Foreign Service flags.

== National diplomatic flags ==
Currently, only two nations use diplomatic flags: Thailand (formerly Siam) and the United Kingdom. Different flags are used based upon the diplomatic rank of the mission. British High Commissions do not use diplomatic flags but rather the normal flag of the United Kingdom, since members of the Commonwealth are not considered 'foreign' by the government of the United Kingdom.

=== Thailand ===
Flag used by Thai Embassies

Flag used by Thai Consulates and Consulates-general

=== United Kingdom ===
Flag used by British Embassies

Flag used by British Consulates and Consulates-general

=== Historical national diplomatic flags ===
==== Siam ====
Flag used by Siamese Embassies 1892–1912

Flag used by Siamese Consulates and Consulates-general 1892–1912

Flag used by Siamese Embassies 1912–1917

Flag used by Siamese Consulates and Consulates-general 1912–1917

Flag used by Siamese Embassies, Consulates and Consulates-general 1917–1927

==== Sweden and Norway ====
The members of the union between Sweden and Norway each had its own national flag, but the Union mark was used as the flag of their common diplomatic representations abroad.

The Union mark

== Personal diplomatic and consular flags ==
=== The Gambia ===
Standard of Ambassadors of the Gambia

=== Sierra Leone ===
Standard of Ambassadors of Sierra Leone

=== United Kingdom ===
Flag of a consular officer afloat (Note: Flag displayed at the bow and not as an ensign.)

Standard of the governor of Anguilla

Standard of the governor of Bermuda

Standard of the commissioner for the British Antarctic Territory

Standard of the governor of the British Virgin Islands

Standard of the governor of the Cayman Islands

Standard of the governor of the Falkland Islands

Standard of the governor of Gibraltar

Standard of the governor of Montserrat

Standard of the governor of Saint Helena

Standard of the commissioner for South Georgia and the South Sandwich Islands

Standard of the governor of the Turks and Caicos Islands

Car flag of a British naval attaché

Car flag of a British military attaché

Car flag of a British air attaché

=== United States ===
Flag of the secretary of state

Flag of the deputy secretary of state

Flag of a United States ambassador

Flag of a Foreign Service officer

Flag of a Consular Officer

=== Historical personal diplomatic flags ===
==== British Empire ====
Flag of the governor of Aden (1937–1963)

Flag of the governor of Anguilla (1990–1999)

Flag of the governor-general of Australia (1902–1908)

Flag of the governor-general of Australia (1908–1936)

Flag of the governor of the Bahamas (1869–1904; 1953–1964)

Flag of the governor of the Bahamas (1904–1953)

Flag of the governor of the Bahamas (1964–1973)

Flag of the governor of Barbados (1870–1966)

Flag of the governor of Bermuda (1875–1910)

Flag of the governor of Bermuda (1910–1999)

Flag of the governor of British Columbia (1870–1871)

Flag of the governor of British Guiana (1875–1906)

Flag of the governor of British Guiana (1906–1955)

Flag of the governor of British Guiana (1955–1966)

Flag of the governor of British Honduras (1884–1981)

Flag of the governor-in-chief of the British Leeward Islands (1874–1952)

Flag of the governor-in-chief of the British Leeward Islands (1952–1959)

Flag of the governor of British Somaliland (1903–1950)

Flag of the governor of British Somaliland (1950–1952)

Flag of the governor of British Somaliland (1952–1960)

Flag of the governor-in-chief of the British Windward Islands (1886–1903)

Flag of the governor-in-chief of the British Windward Islands (1903–1953)

Flag of the governor-in-chief of the British Windward Islands (1953–1960)

Flag of the governor of Burma (1939–1948)

Flag of the governor-general of Canada (1869–1901)

Flag of the governor-general of Canada (1901–1921)

Flag of the governor-general of Canada (1921–1931)

Flag of the governor of the Cayman Islands (1971–1999)

Flag of the governor of Ceylon (1875–1948)

Flag of the high commissioner of Cyprus (1881–1905)

Flag of the high commissioner of Cyprus (1905–1925) and the governor of Cyprus (1925–1960)

Flag of the governor of the Falkland Islands (1876–1925)

Flag of the governor of the Falkland Islands (1925–1948)

Flag of the governor of the Falkland Islands (1948–1999)

Flag of the governor of Fiji (1877–1883)

Flag of the governor of Fiji (1883–1903)

Flag of the governor of Fiji (1903–1908)

Flag of the governor of Fiji (1908–1970)

Flag of the governor of Gibraltar (1875–1939)

Flag of the governor of Gibraltar (1939–1982)

Flag of the governor of Gibraltar (1982–1999)

Flag of the resident commissioner and the governor of the Gilbert and Ellice Islands (1937–1976)

Flag of the governor of Hong Kong (1910–1955)

Flag of the governor of Hong Kong (1955–1959)

Flag of the governor of Hong Kong (1959–1997)

Flag of the viceroy and governor-general of India (1885–1947)

Flag of the governor of Jamaica (1875–1906)

Flag of the governor of Jamaica (1906–1957)

Flag of the governor of Jamaica (1957–1962)

Flag of the governor of Jamaica (1962)

Flag of the governor of Malta (1875–1898)

Flag of the governor of Malta (1898–1943)

Flag of the governor of Malta (1943–1964)

Flag of the governor of Mauritius (1869–1906)

Flag of the governor of Mauritius (1906–1968)

Flag of the governor of Montserrat (1971–1999)

Flag of the governor of Newfoundland (1870–1904)

Flag of the governor of Newfoundland (1904–1949)

Flag of the resident commissioner of the British New Hebrides (1906–1952)

Flag of the resident commissioner of the British New Hebrides (1952–1980)

Flag of the governor of New Zealand (1868–1874)

Flag of the governor of New Zealand (1874–1908)

Flag of the governor of New Zealand (1908–1936)

Flag of the governor of North Borneo (1915–1946)

Flag of the governor of North Borneo (1948–1963)

Flag of the high commissioner of Palestine (1927–1948)

Flag of the lieutenant-governor of Papua (1904–1942)

Flag of the governor-general of the Federation of Rhodesia and Nyasaland (1953–1963)

Flag of the administrator of Saint Christopher-Nevis-Anguilla (1958–1967)

Flag of the governor of Saint Christopher-Nevis-Anguilla (1967–1980)

Flag of the governor of Saint Christopher and Nevis (1980–1983)

Flag of the governor of Sarawak (1947–1963)

Flag of the governor of Seychelles (1903–1961)

Flag of the governor of Seychelles (1961–1976)

Flag of the governor of Singapore (1946–1952)

Flag of the governor of Singapore (1952–1959)

Flag of the governor of the Solomon Islands (1953–1956)

Flag of the governor of the Solomon Islands (1956–1978)

Flag of the governor-general of South Africa (1910–1931)

Flag of the governor of Southern Rhodesia (1924–1951)

Household flag of the governor of Southern Rhodesia (1940–1952)

Flag of the governor of Southern Rhodesia (1951–1952)

Household flag of the governor of Southern Rhodesia (1952–1970)

Flag of the governor of Southern Rhodesia (1952–1970)

Flag of the governor of the Straits Settlements (1874–1904)

Flag of the governor of the Straits Settlements (1904–1946)

Flag of the governor of Tanganyika (1923–1961)

Flag of the governor of Trinidad and Tobago (1889–1958)

Flag of the governor of Trinidad and Tobago (1958–1962)

Flag of the commissioner and the administrator of the Turks and Caicos (1889–1968)

Flag of the governor of Tuvalu (1976–1978)

Flag of the commissioner of Weihaiwei (1899–1903)

Flag of the commissioner of Weihaiwei (1903–1930)

Flag of the administrator of Western Samoa (1920–1948)

==== Yugoslavia ====
The flag for the accredited representatives of the state (diplomats and heads of consular missions) of the Socialist Federal Republic of Yugoslavia was similar to the civil ensign, that is the national flag in 2:3 ratio.

Diplomatic and consular representatives

== See also ==
- List of flags of the United States#Department of State
