= Consulate General of Thailand, Chennai =

Diplomatic mission of Thailand in South India

Royal Thai Consulate-General, Chennai
- สถานกงสุลใหญ่ไทย ณ เมืองเจนไน தாய்லாந்துத் துணைதூதரகம், சென்னை
- Thai Garuda emblem
- Incumbent; Racha Aribarg since 2024
- Ministry of Foreign Affairs
- Style: Consul-General
- Inaugural holder: Suphot Yanthukij
- Formation: 2005
- Website: Official website

The Consulate General of Thailand in Chennai is the mission of Thailand in South India representing the interests of the Thai government in the region. The other missions in the country are the Royal Thai Embassy in New Delhi and the Royal Thai Consulates General in Kolkata and Mumbai. The Chennai Consulate covers the southern states of Tamil Nadu, Andhra Pradesh, Telangana, Karnataka and Kerala. The current Consul General is Racha Aribarg. He succeeds Nitirooge Phoneprasert.

== Location ==
The chancery premises of the Royal Thai Consulate-General in Chennai is located at No.116, Chamiers Road, Nandanam, Chennai. with effect from 1 November 2018. Earlier, the chancery, along with the Thai Trade Office, was located at No.116, Chamiers Road, Nandanam, Chennai.

== History ==
Plans to establish a Royal Thai Consulate General in Chennai were implemented in 2003. The consulate was completed in late 2005.

In November 2005, the Consulate General in Chennai opened the first Thailand Visa Application Centre in the city located at Mount Road, Teynampet. A new visa application center was inaugurated by Consul-General Krongkanit Rakcharoen at Egmore in 2018.

On 8 October 2006, the Consulate General founded the Thai Student Associations Bangalore (ThaiSAB), a non-profit voluntary union of Thai students pursuing academic and research disciplines around Bangalore.

== List of consuls general ==
- Mr. Suphot Yanthukij
- Mr. Chanchai Charanvatnakit
- Mr. Somsak Triamjangarun
- Mrs. Krongkanit Rakcharoen (–2019) (First female consul general)
- Mr. Nitirooge Phoneprasert (2019–2024)
- Mr. Racha Aribarg (August 2024–Present)

== Functions ==
In 2009, the Chennai Consulate General issued nearly 300 visas a day, while the Embassy at New Delhi ranked top by processing 600 visas per day. The Chennai Consulate General contributed nearly 20 percent of the annual flow to Thailand.

The Consulate General has under its control the visa application centres located at Chennai, Hyderabad, Bangalore, and Kochi, with the Chennai Consulate assessing all applications. As of 2011, the Chennai centre was receiving 400 to 600 visa applications per day. In October 2022, the Consulate renewed pan-India visa application processing mandate with VFS Global.

== Social activities ==
On 11 October 2010, the Consulate General donated a set of books on cultural history, people, political hierarchy, places and economic significance of Thailand to the Anna Centenary Library at Kotturpuram.

== See also ==
- Embassy of Thailand, New Delhi
- List of diplomatic missions in Chennai
- India-Thailand relations
- List of diplomatic missions of Thailand
- Foreign relations of India
- Foreign relations of Thailand
