= List of diplomatic missions of Thailand =

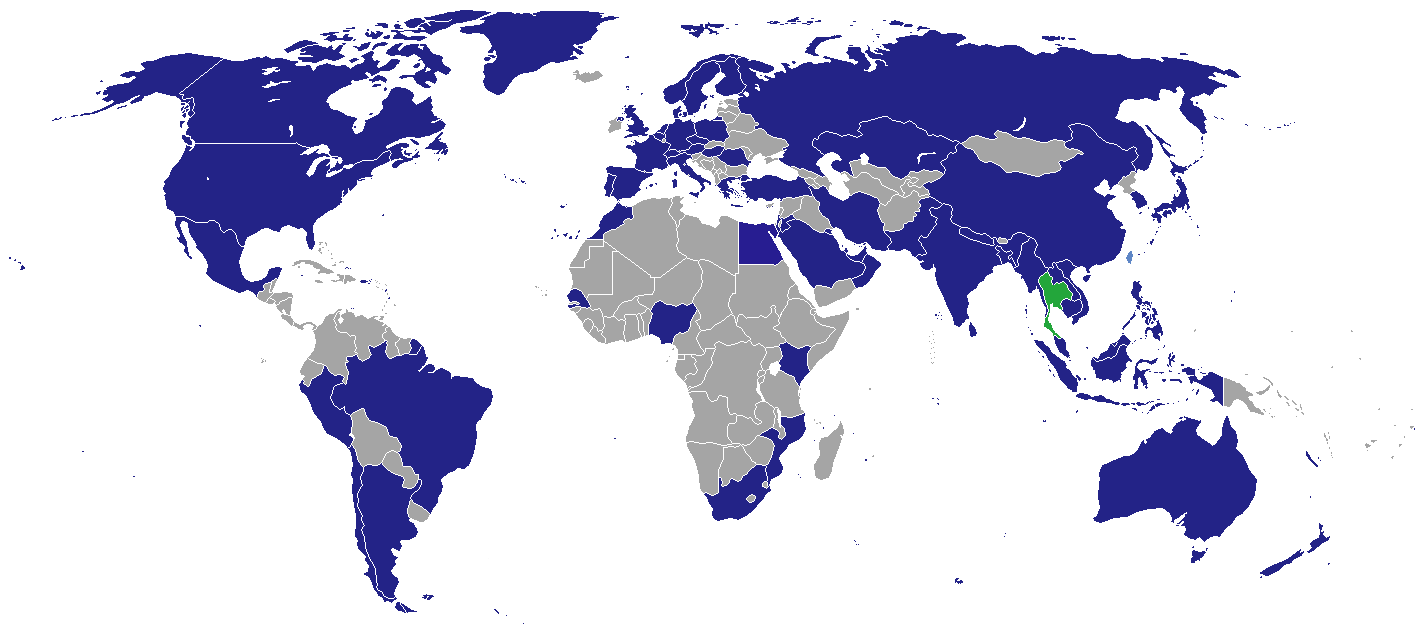
Thai diplomatic missions

This is a list of diplomatic missions of Thailand, excluding honorary consulates.

== Current missions ==
=== Africa ===
| Host country | Host city | Mission | Concurrent accreditation | Ref. |
|---|---|---|---|---|
| Egypt | Cairo | Embassy | Countries: Djibouti; Eritrea; Libya; Sudan | |
| Kenya | Nairobi | Embassy | Countries: Burundi; Comoros; Congo-Kinshasa; Ethiopia; Rwanda; Seychelles; Somalia; South Sudan; Tanzania; Uganda; Multilateral Organizations: United Nations; United Nations Environment Programme; United Nations Human Settlements Programme | |
| Morocco | Rabat | Embassy | Countries: Mauritania; Tunisia | |
| Mozambique | Maputo | Embassy | | |
| Nigeria | Abuja | Embassy | Countries: Benin; Cameroon; Chad; Central African Republic; Congo-Brazzaville; Equatorial Guinea; Ghana; Niger; São Tomé and Príncipe | |
| Senegal | Dakar | Embassy | Countries: Burkina Faso; Cape Verde; Gabon; Gambia; Guinea; Guinea-Bissau; Ivory Coast; Liberia; Mali; Sierra Leone; Togo | |
| South Africa | Pretoria | Embassy | Countries: Angola; Botswana; Eswatini; Lesotho; Malawi; Mauritius; Namibia; Zimbabwe | |

=== Americas ===
| Host country | Host city | Mission | Concurrent accreditation | Ref. |
|---|---|---|---|---|
| Argentina | Buenos Aires | Embassy | Countries: Paraguay; Uruguay | |
| Brazil | Brasília | Embassy | Countries: Guyana; Suriname | |
| Canada | Ottawa | Embassy | Countries: Antigua and Barbuda; Bahamas; Barbados; Dominica; Dominican Republic; Grenada; Jamaica; Saint Lucia; Saint Vincent and the Grenadines; Trinidad and Tobago | |
| Canada | Vancouver | Consulate-General | Countries: Antigua and Barbuda; Bahamas; Barbados; Dominica; Dominican Republic; Grenada; Jamaica; Saint Lucia; Saint Vincent and the Grenadines; Trinidad and Tobago | |
| Chile | Santiago de Chile | Embassy | Countries: Costa Rica; El Salvador; Panama | |
| Mexico | Mexico City | Embassy | Countries: Belize; Cuba; Guatemala; Honduras; Nicaragua | |
| Peru | Lima | Embassy | Countries: Bolivia; Colombia; Ecuador; Venezuela | |
| United States | Washington, D.C. | Embassy | Multilateral Organizations: Organization of American States (Note: Accredited as an observer mission.) | |
| United States | Chicago | Consulate-General | Multilateral Organizations: Organization of American States | |
| United States | Los Angeles | Consulate-General | Multilateral Organizations: Organization of American States | |
| United States | New York City | Consulate-General | Multilateral Organizations: Organization of American States | |

=== Asia ===
| Host country | Host city | Mission | Concurrent accreditation | Ref. |
|---|---|---|---|---|
| Bahrain | Manama | Embassy | | |
| Bangladesh | Dhaka | Embassy | Countries: Bhutan | |
| Brunei | Bandar Seri Begawan | Embassy | | |
| Cambodia | Phnom Penh | Embassy | | |
| Cambodia | Siem Reap | Consulate-General | | |
| China | Beijing | Embassy | Countries: Micronesia; Mongolia; North Korea | |
| China | Chengdu | Consulate-General | Countries: Micronesia; Mongolia; North Korea | |
| China | Guangzhou | Consulate-General | Countries: Micronesia; Mongolia; North Korea | |
| China | Hong Kong | Consulate-General | Countries: Micronesia; Mongolia; North Korea | |
| China | Kunming | Consulate-General | Countries: Micronesia; Mongolia; North Korea | |
| China | Nanning | Consulate-General | Countries: Micronesia; Mongolia; North Korea | |
| China | Qingdao | Consulate-General | Countries: Micronesia; Mongolia; North Korea | |
| China | Shanghai | Consulate-General | Countries: Micronesia; Mongolia; North Korea | |
| China | Xiamen | Consulate-General | Countries: Micronesia; Mongolia; North Korea | |
| China | Xi'an | Consulate-General | Countries: Micronesia; Mongolia; North Korea | |
| India | New Delhi | Embassy | | |
| India | Chennai | Consulate-General | | |
| India | Kolkata | Consulate-General | | |
| India | Mumbai | Consulate-General | | |
| Indonesia | Jakarta | Embassy | | |
| Iran | Tehran | Embassy | | |
| Israel | Tel Aviv | Embassy | | |
| Japan | Tokyo | Embassy | | |
| Japan | Fukuoka | Consulate-General | | |
| Japan | Osaka | Consulate-General | | |
| Jordan | Amman | Embassy | Countries: Iraq; Palestine | |
| Kazakhstan | Astana | Embassy | Countries: Kyrgyzstan; Tajikistan | |
| Kuwait | Kuwait City | Embassy | | |
| Laos | Vientiane | Embassy | | |
| Laos | Savannakhet | Consulate-General | | |
| Malaysia | Kuala Lumpur | Embassy | | |
| Malaysia | George Town | Consulate-General | | |
| Malaysia | Kota Bharu | Consulate-General | | |
| Myanmar | Yangon | Embassy | | |
| Nepal | Kathmandu | Embassy | | |
| Oman | Muscat | Embassy | | |
| Pakistan | Islamabad | Embassy | Countries: Afghanistan | |
| Pakistan | Karachi | Consulate-General | Countries: Afghanistan | |
| Philippines | Manila | Embassy | Countries: Palau | |
| Qatar | Doha | Embassy | | |
| Republic of China (Taiwan) | Taipei | Trade & Economic Office | | |
| Saudi Arabia | Riyadh | Embassy | Countries: Lebanon | |
| Saudi Arabia | Jeddah | Consulate-General | Countries: Lebanon | |
| Singapore | Singapore | Embassy | | |
| South Korea | Seoul | Embassy | | |
| Sri Lanka | Colombo | Embassy | Countries: Maldives | |
| Timor-Leste | Dili | Embassy | | |
| Turkey | Ankara | Embassy | Countries: Georgia; North Macedonia; Turkmenistan | |
| United Arab Emirates | Abu Dhabi | Embassy | | |
| United Arab Emirates | Dubai | Consulate-General | | |
| Vietnam | Hanoi | Embassy | | |
| Vietnam | Ho Chi Minh City | Consulate-General | | |

=== Europe ===
| Host country | Host city | Mission | Concurrent accreditation | Ref. |
|---|---|---|---|---|
| Austria | Vienna | Embassy | Countries: Slovakia; Slovenia; Multilateral Organizations: United Nations; International Atomic Energy Agency; Organization for Security and Co-operation in Europe; United Nations Industrial Development Organization | |
| Belgium | Brussels | Embassy | Countries: Luxembourg | |
| Czechia | Prague | Embassy | | |
| Denmark | Copenhagen | Embassy | Countries: Lithuania | |
| Finland | Helsinki | Embassy | Countries: Estonia | |
| France | Paris | Embassy | Countries: Algeria; Monaco | |
| Germany | Berlin | Embassy | | |
| Germany | Frankfurt | Consulate-General | | |
| Germany | Munich | Consulate-General | | |
| Greece | Athens | Embassy | Countries: Serbia; Malta | |
| Hungary | Budapest | Embassy | Countries: Bosnia and Herzegovina; Croatia; Kosovo; Montenegro | |
| Italy | Rome | Embassy | Countries: Albania; Cyprus; San Marino; Sovereign Entity: Sovereign Military Order of Malta | |
| Netherlands | The Hague | Embassy | Multilateral Organizations: Organisation for the Prohibition of Chemical Weapons | |
| Norway | Oslo | Embassy | Countries: Iceland | |
| Poland | Warsaw | Embassy | Countries: Ukraine | |
| Portugal | Lisbon | Embassy | | |
| Romania | Bucharest | Embassy | Countries: Bulgaria | |
| Russia | Moscow | Embassy | Countries: Armenia; Belarus; Moldova; Uzbekistan | |
| Spain | Madrid | Embassy | Countries: Andorra | |
| Sweden | Stockholm | Embassy | Countries: Latvia | |
| Switzerland | Bern | Embassy | Countries: Holy See; Liechtenstein | |
| United Kingdom | London | Embassy | Countries: Ireland; Multilateral Organizations: International Maritime Organization | |

=== Oceania ===
| Host country | Host city | Mission | Concurrent accreditation | Ref. |
|---|---|---|---|---|
| Australia | Canberra | Embassy | Countries: Fiji; Kiribati; Papua New Guinea; Solomon Islands; Vanuatu | |
| Australia | Sydney | Consulate-General | Countries: Fiji; Kiribati; Papua New Guinea; Solomon Islands; Vanuatu | |
| New Zealand | Wellington | Embassy | Countries: Cook Islands; Niue; Samoa; Tonga | |

=== Multilateral organizations ===
| Organization | Host city | Host country | Mission | Concurrent accreditation | Ref. |
|---|---|---|---|---|---|
| Association of Southeast Asian Nations | Jakarta | Indonesia | Permanent Mission | | |
| United Nations | New York City | United States | Permanent Mission | Countries: Haiti; Marshall Islands; Nauru; Tuvalu | |
| United Nations | Geneva | Switzerland | Permanent Mission | | |

== Gallery ==
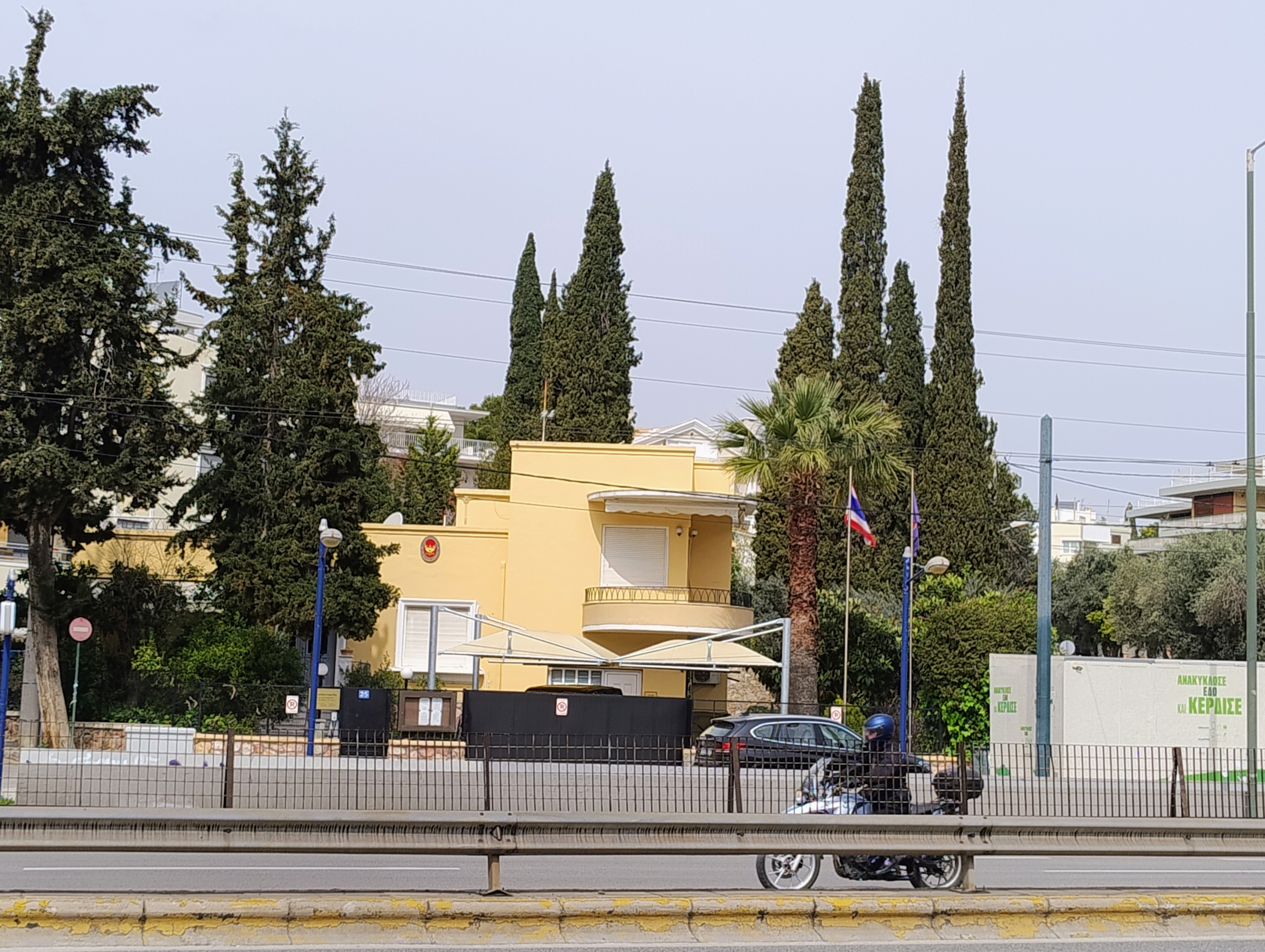
Embassy in Athens

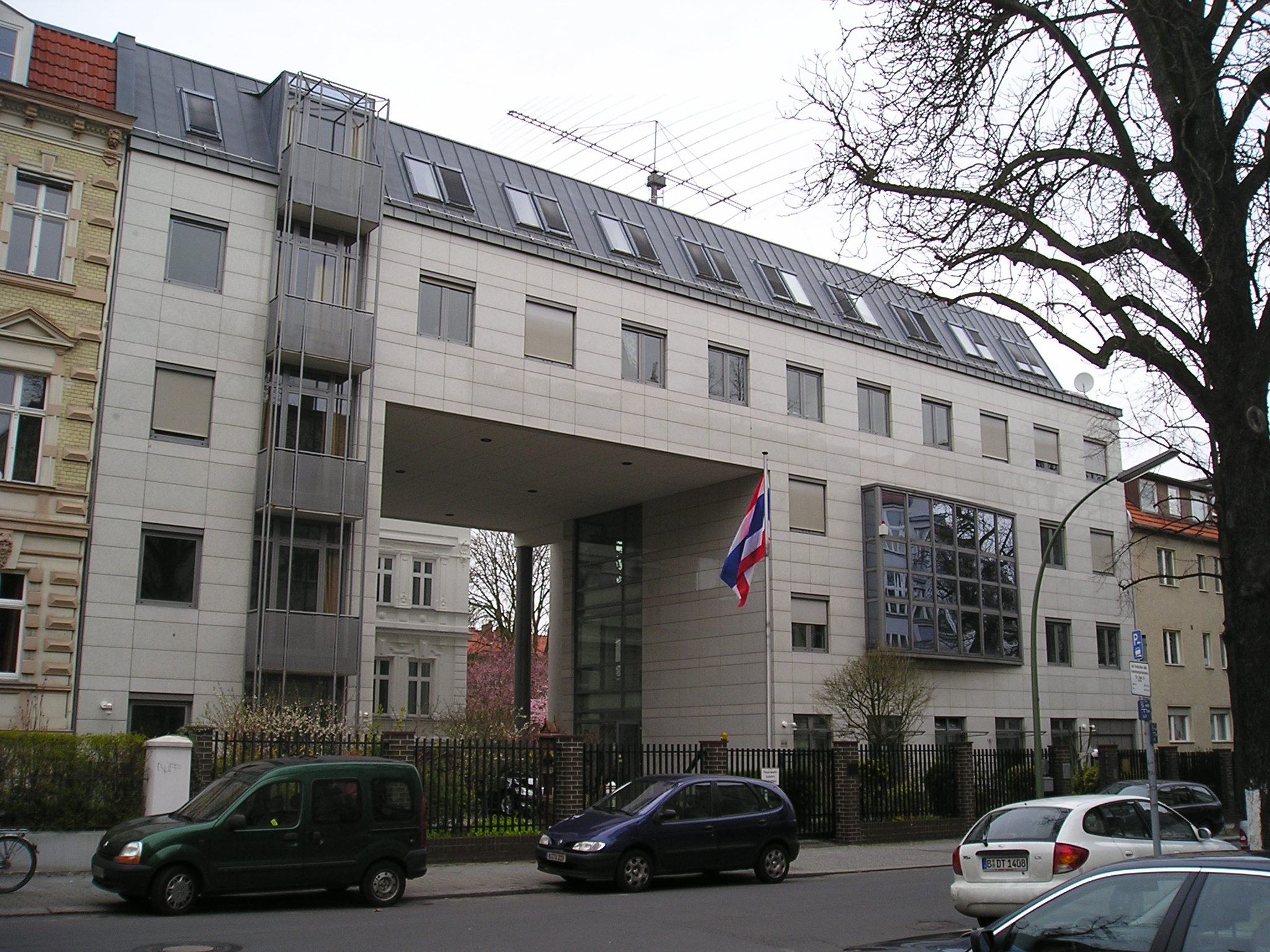
Embassy in Berlin

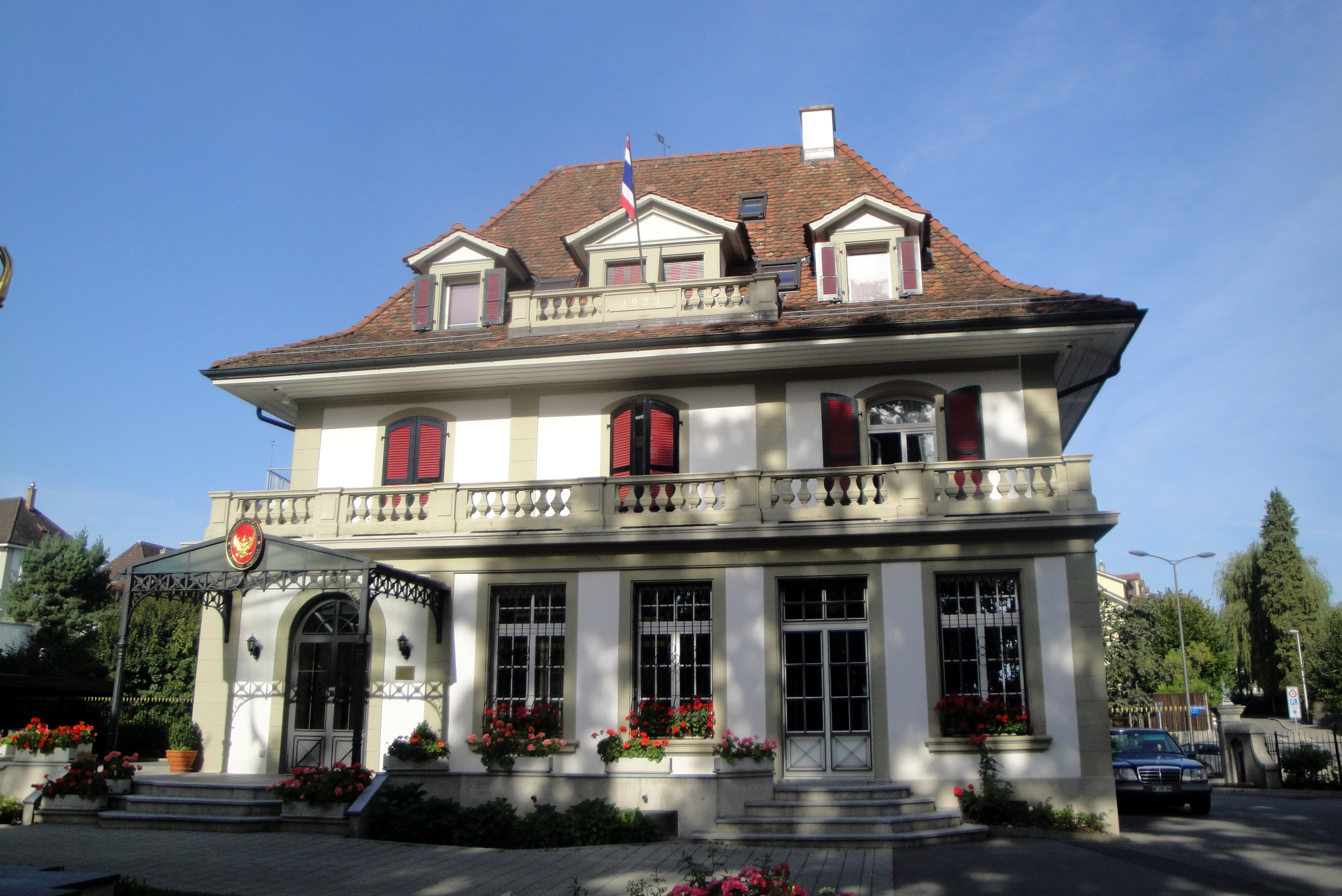
Embassy in Bern

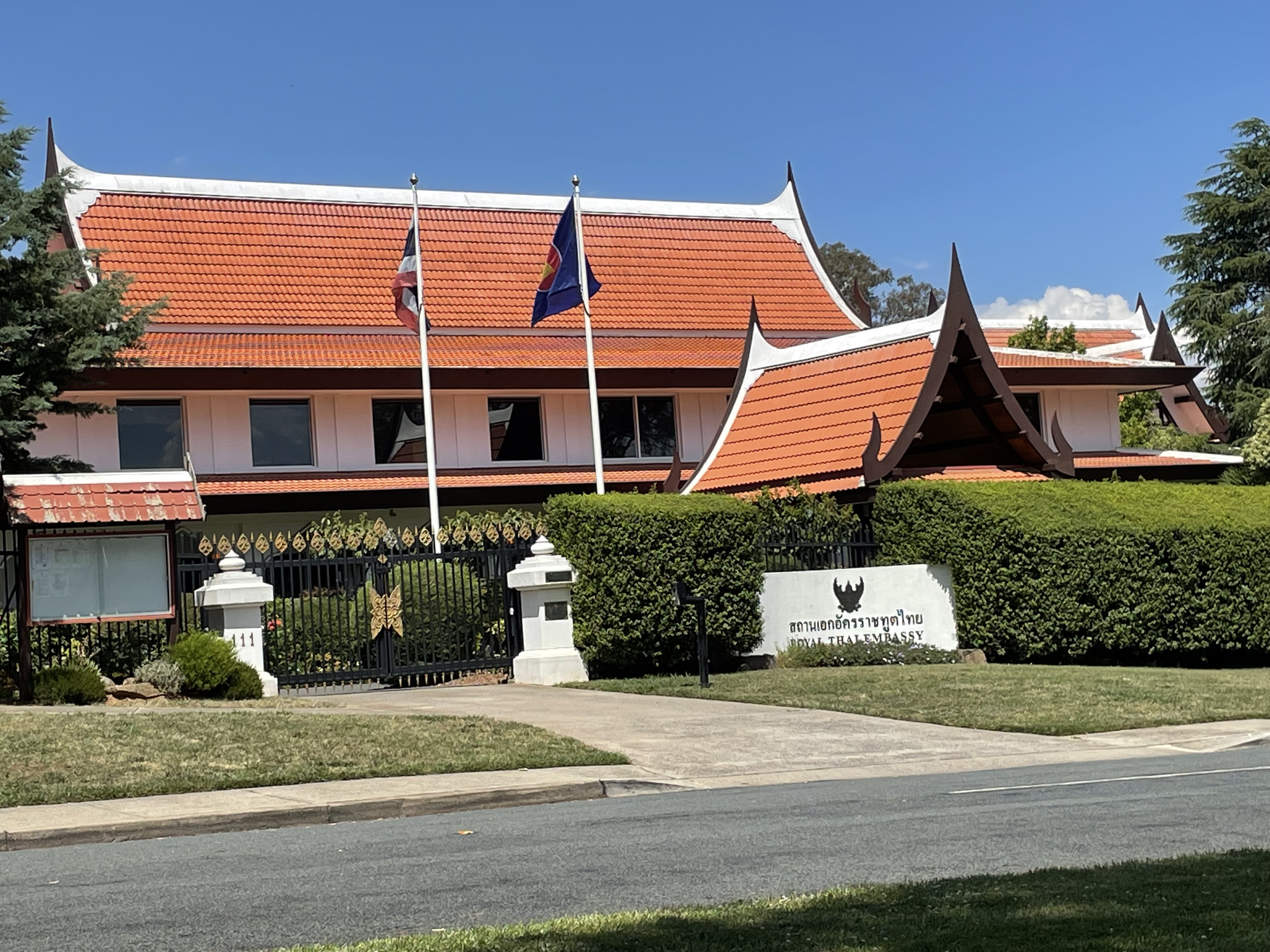
Embassy in Canberra

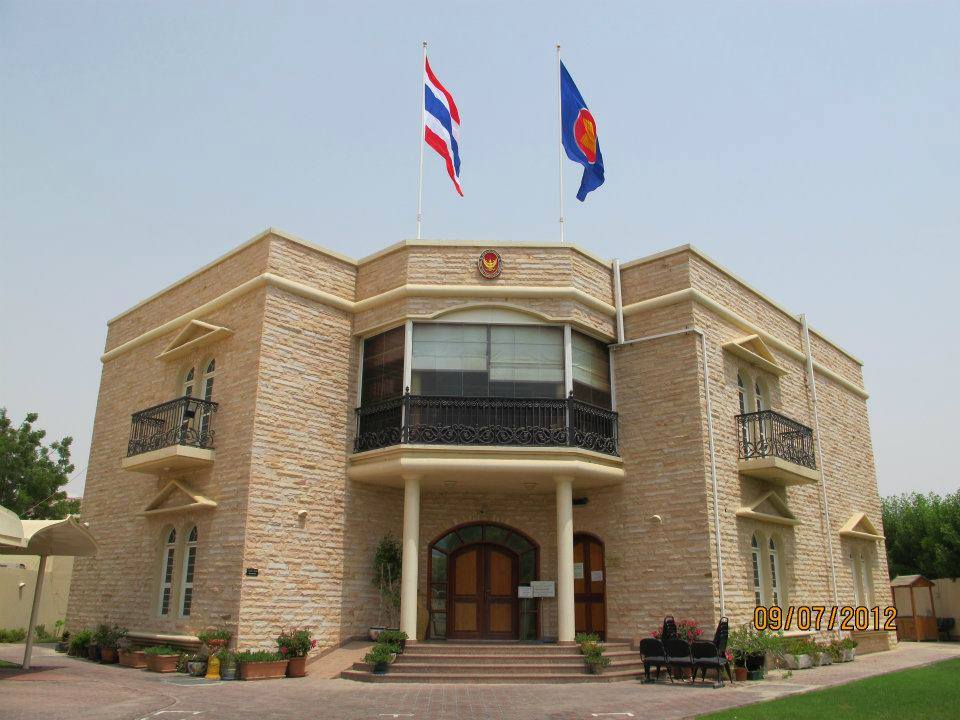
Consulate-General in Dubai

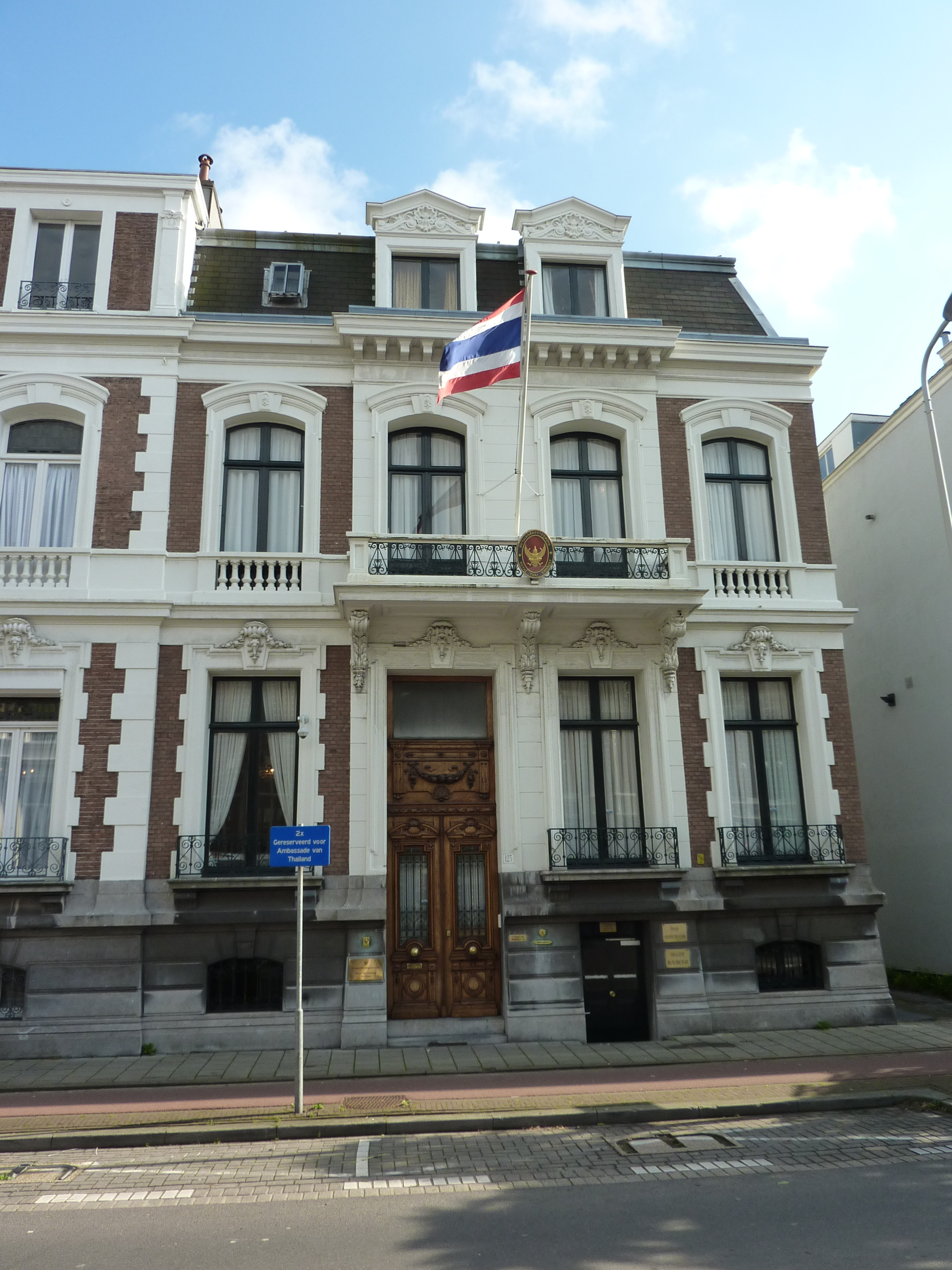
Embassy in The Hague

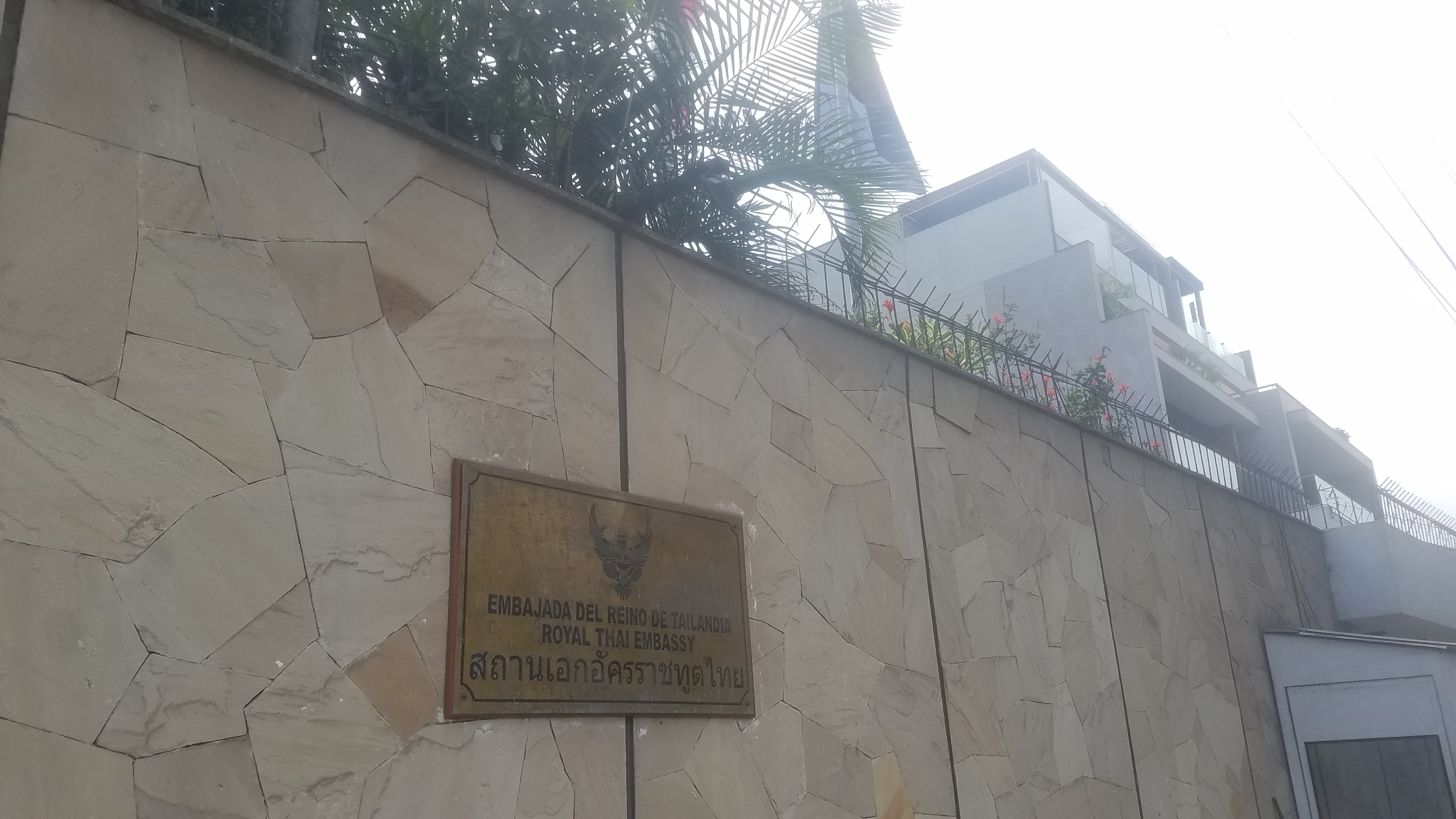
Embassy in Lima

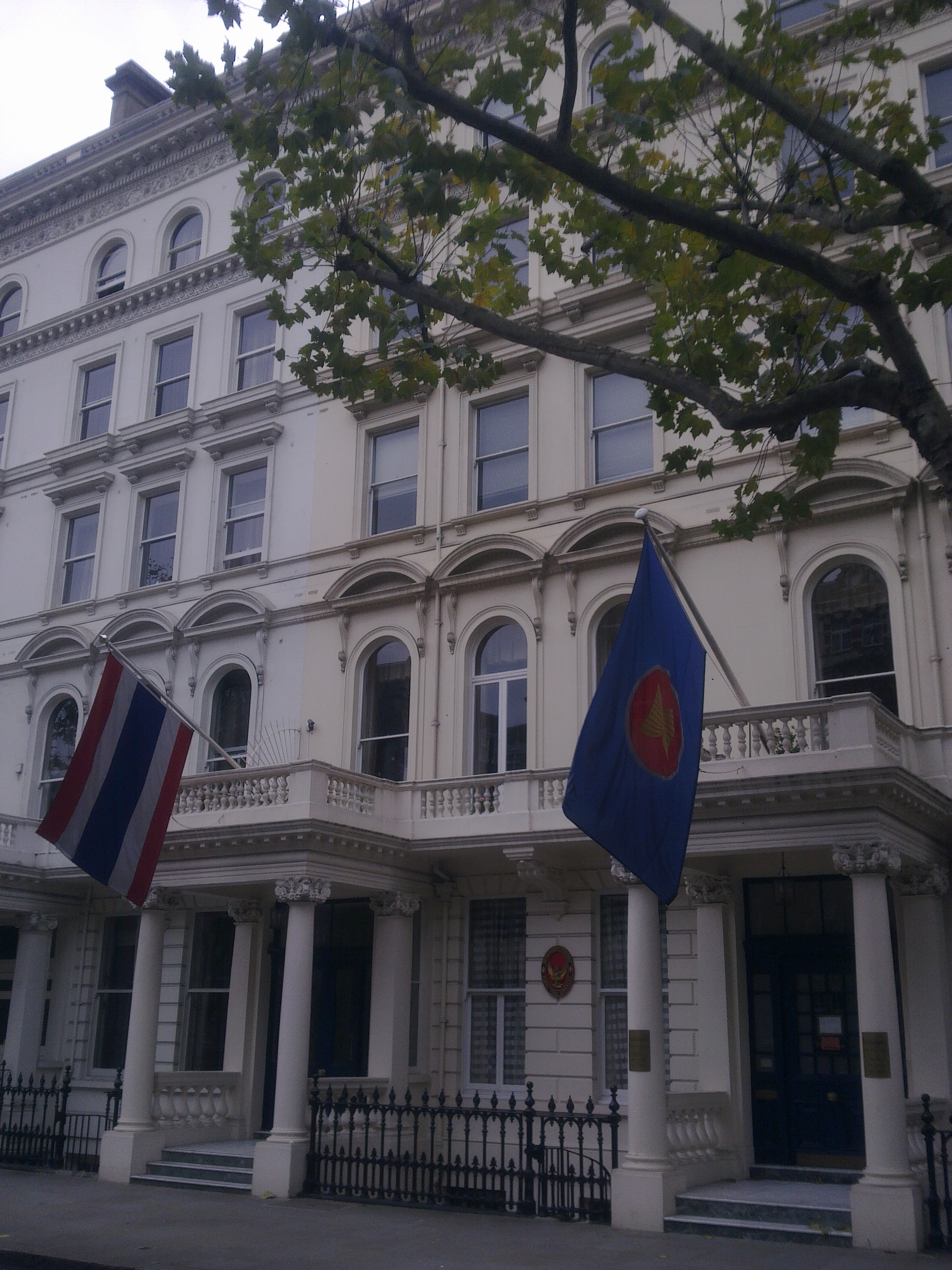
Embassy in London

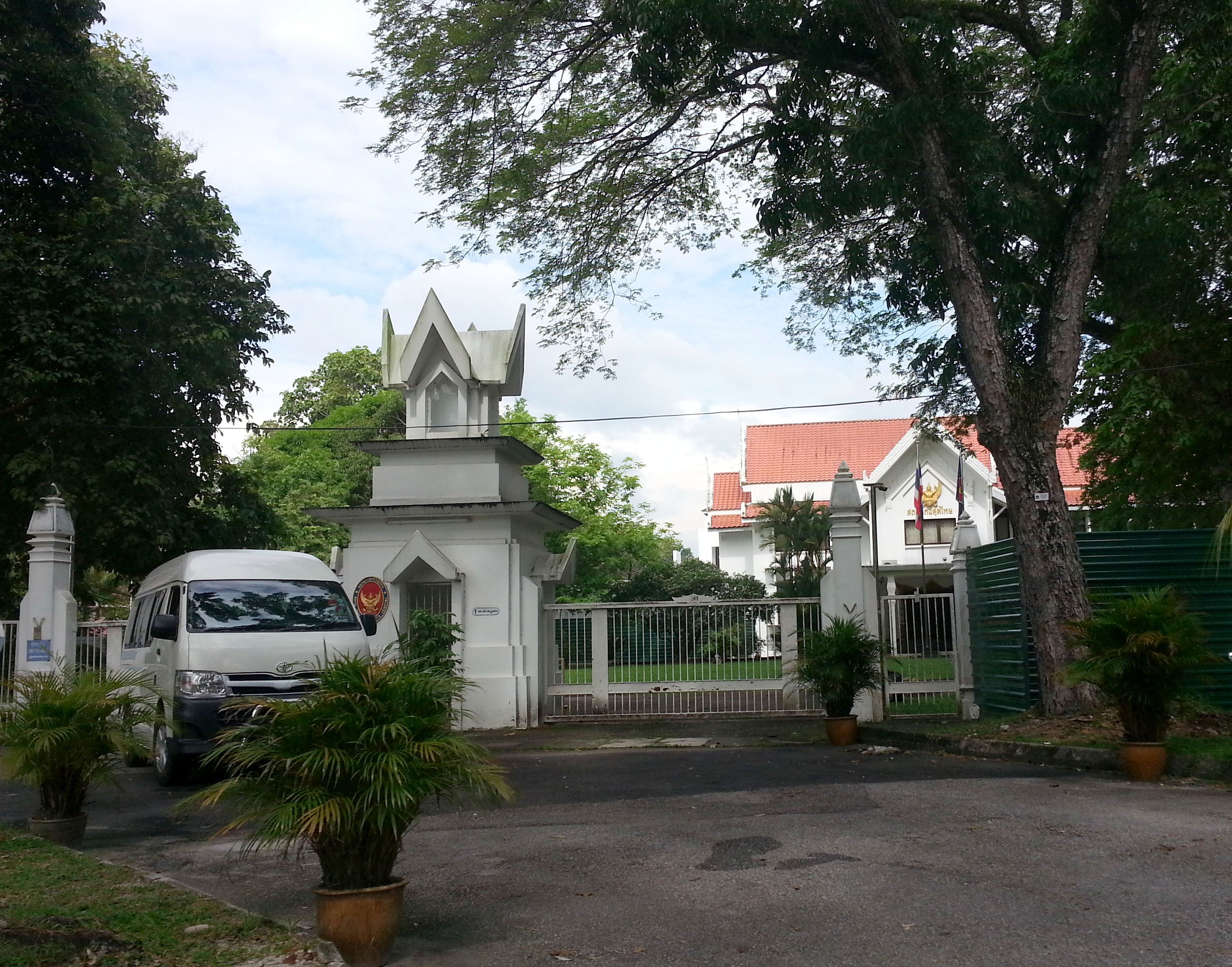
Consulate-General in George Town

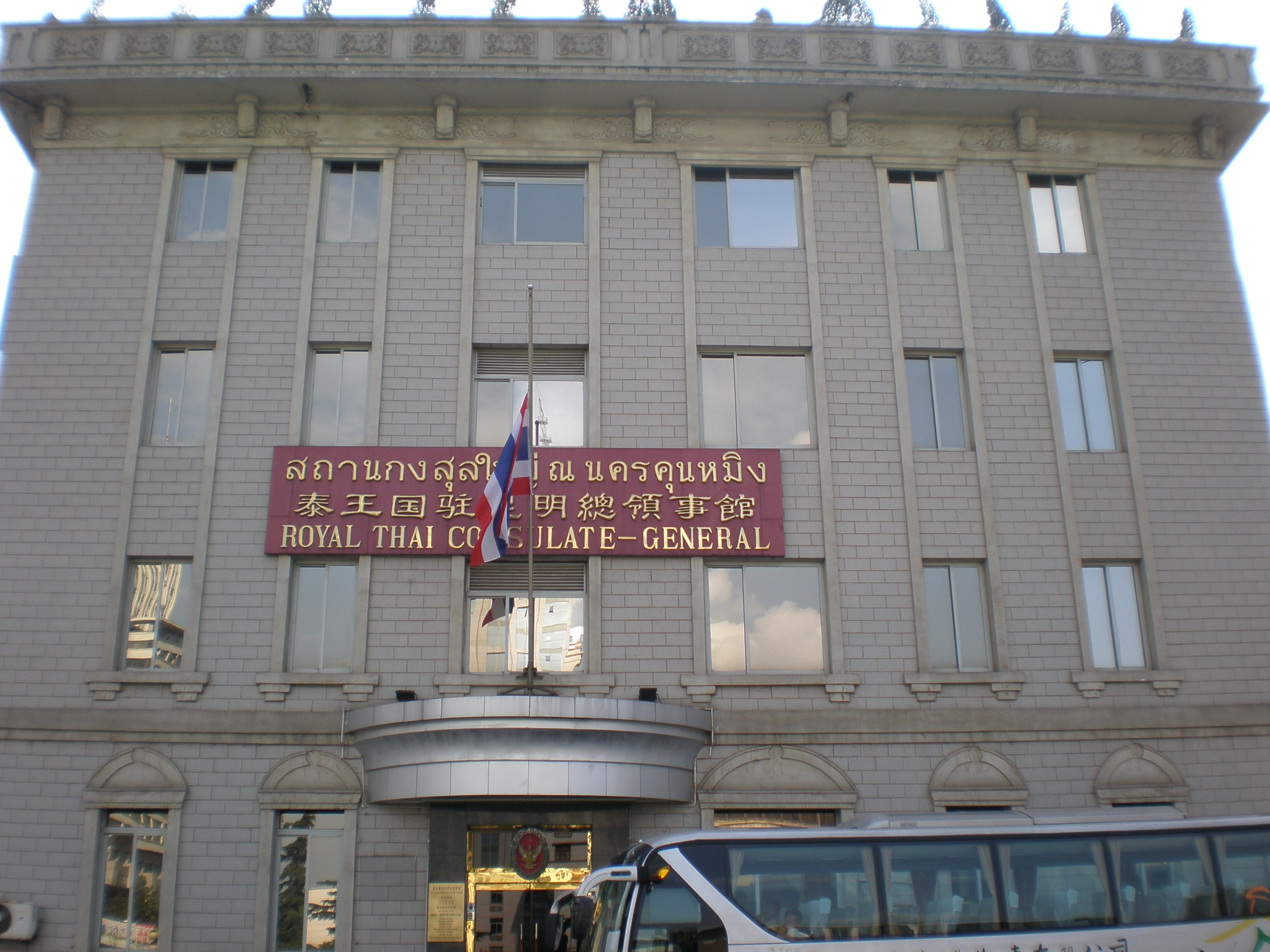
Consulate-General in Kunming

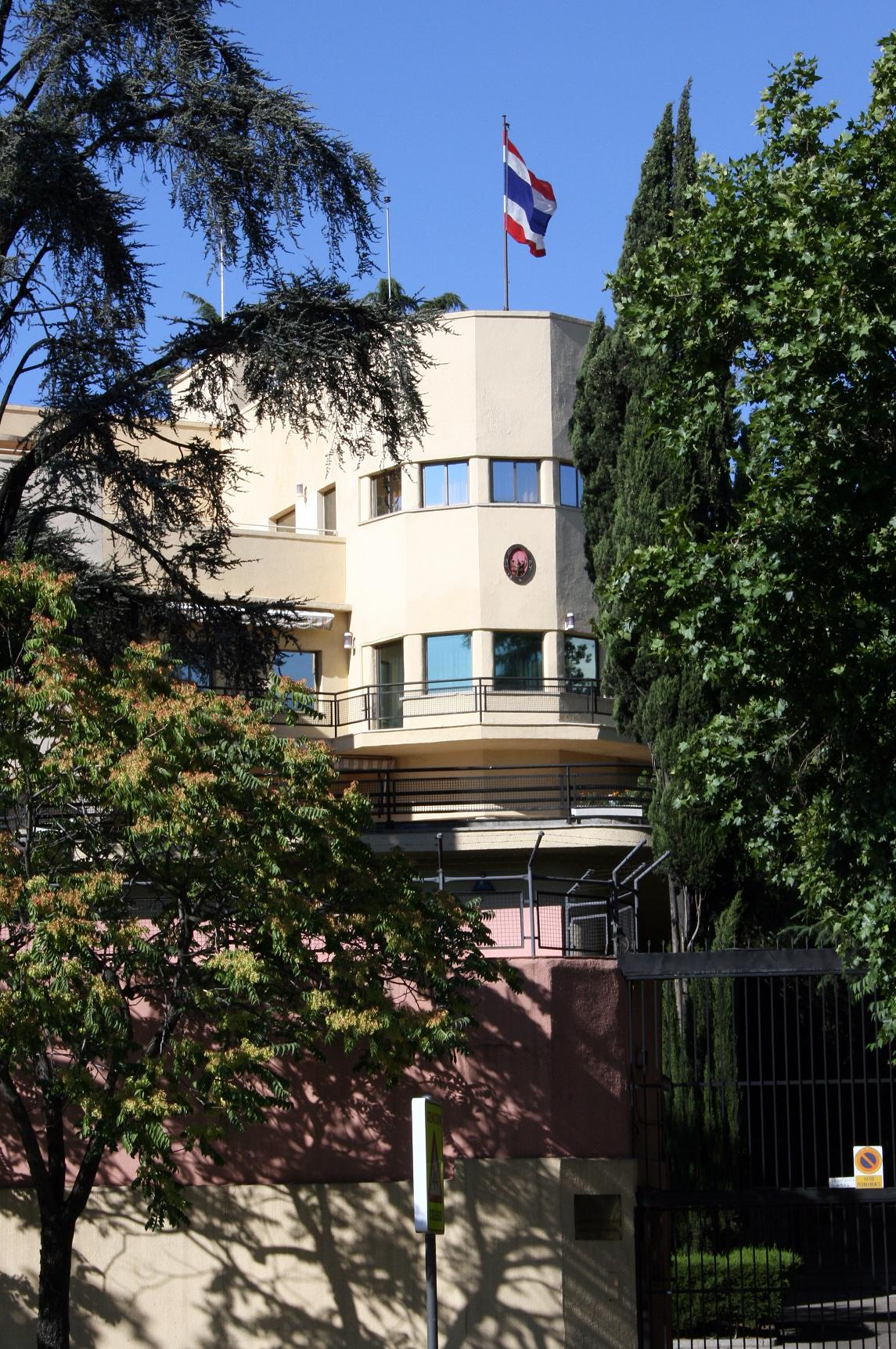
Embassy in Madrid

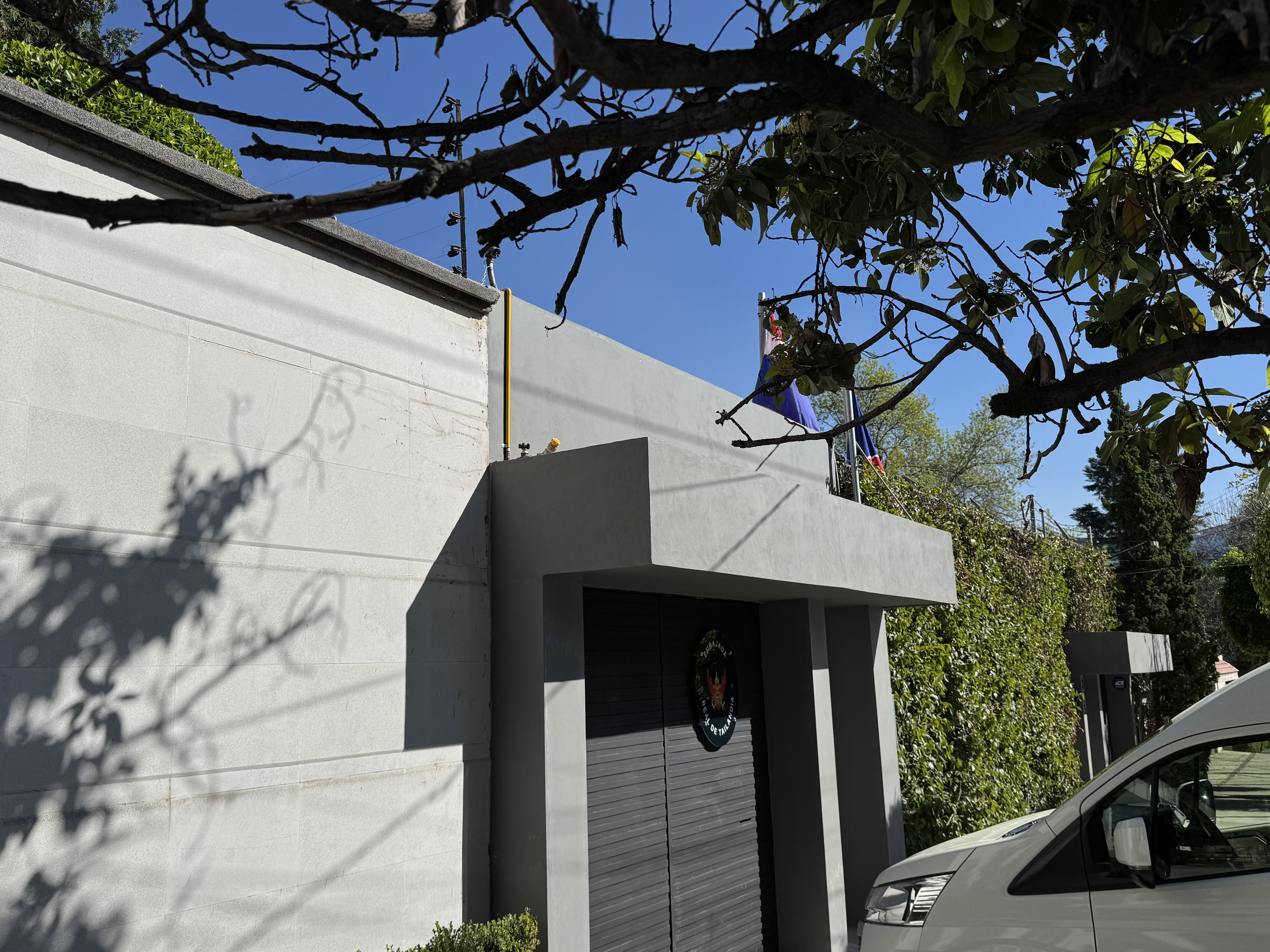
Embassy in Mexico City

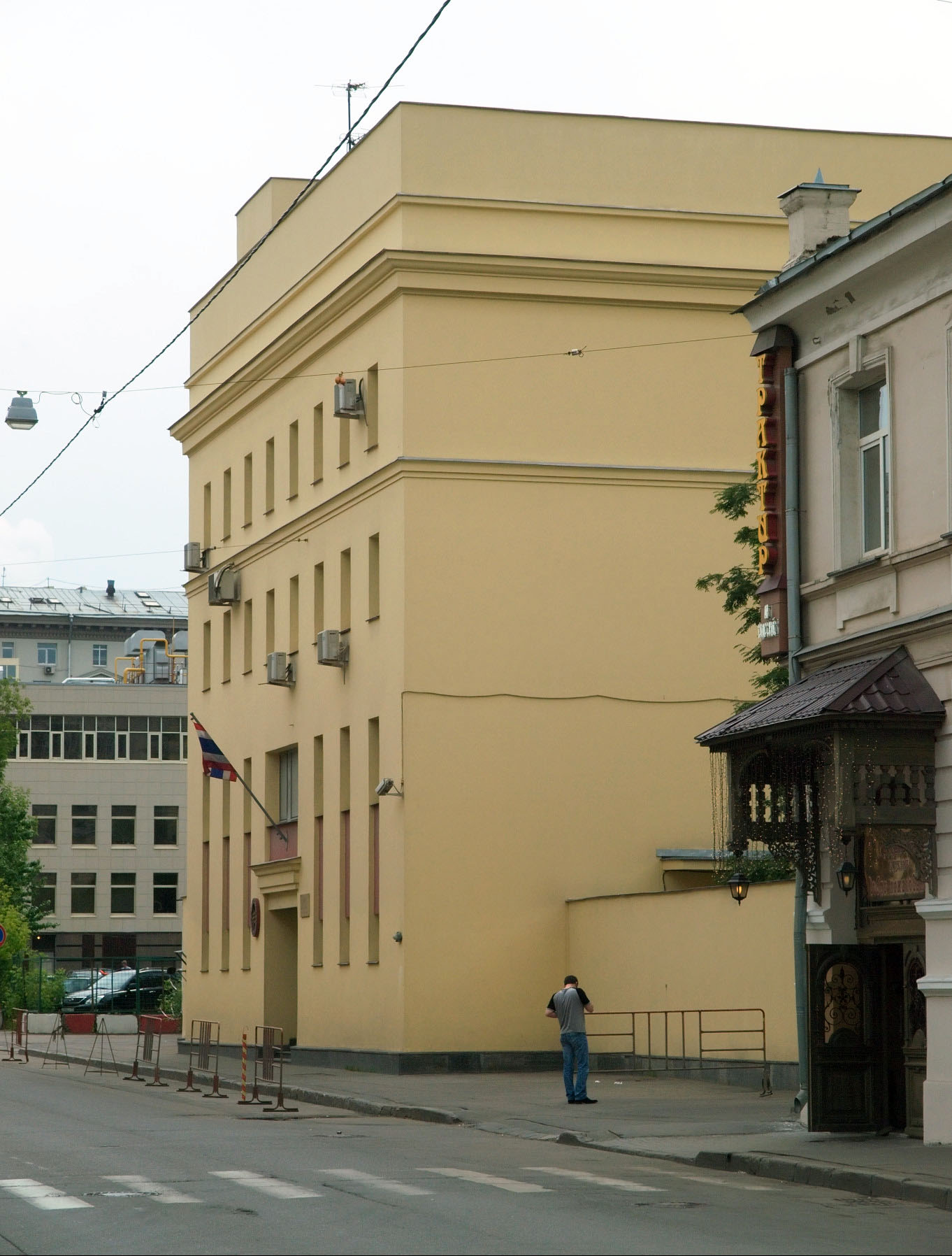
Embassy in Moscow

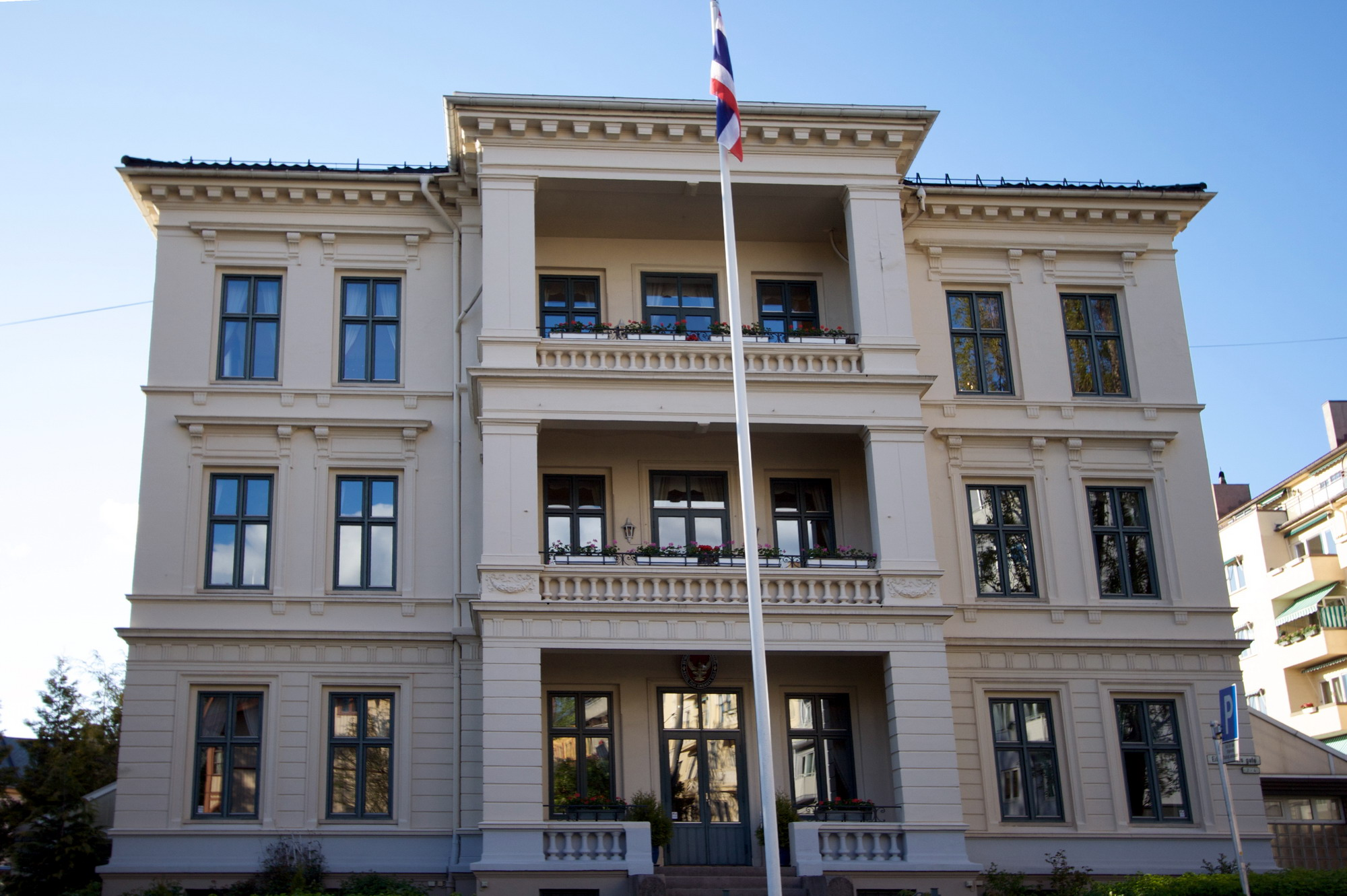
Embassy in Oslo

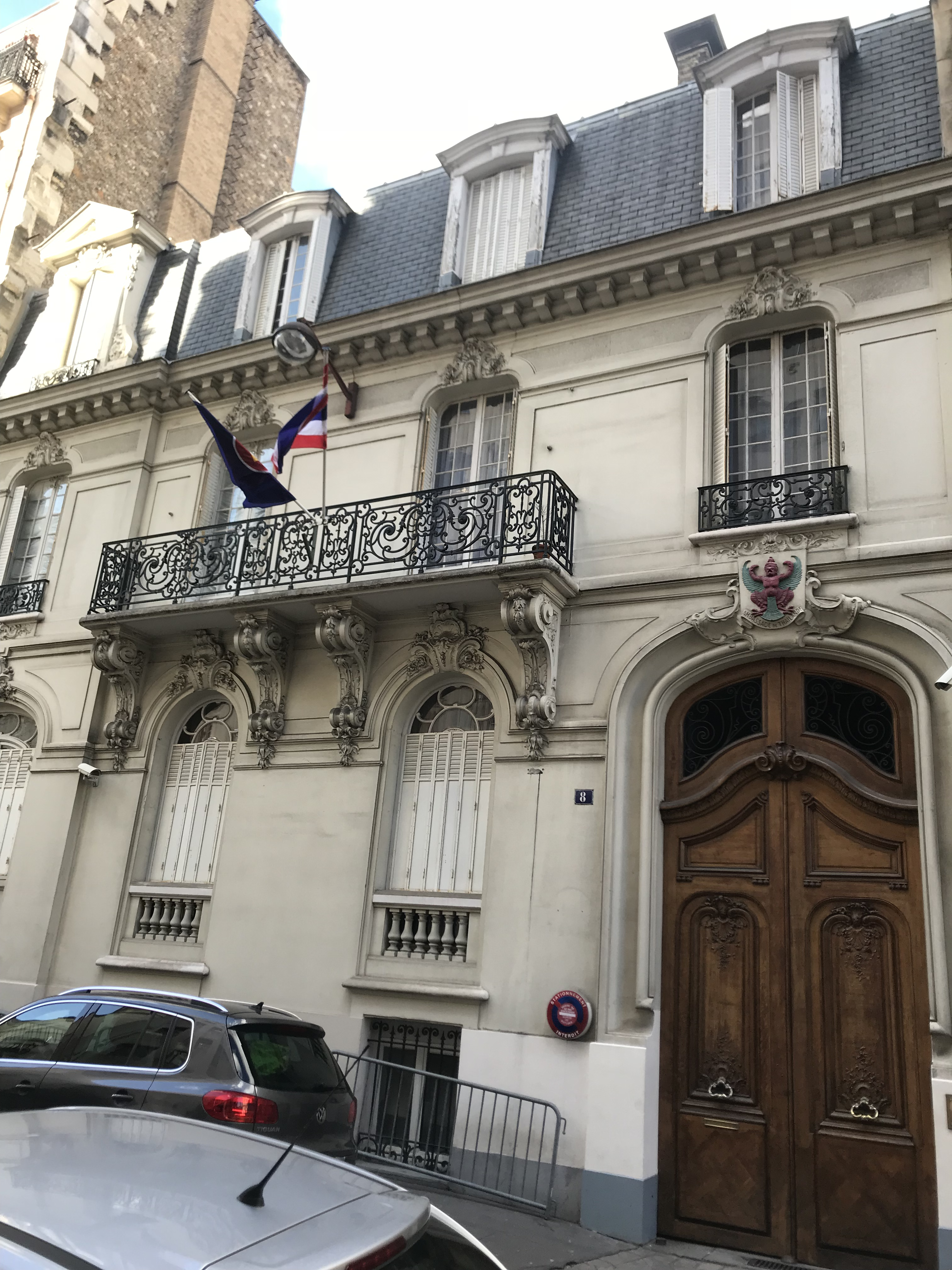
Embassy in Paris

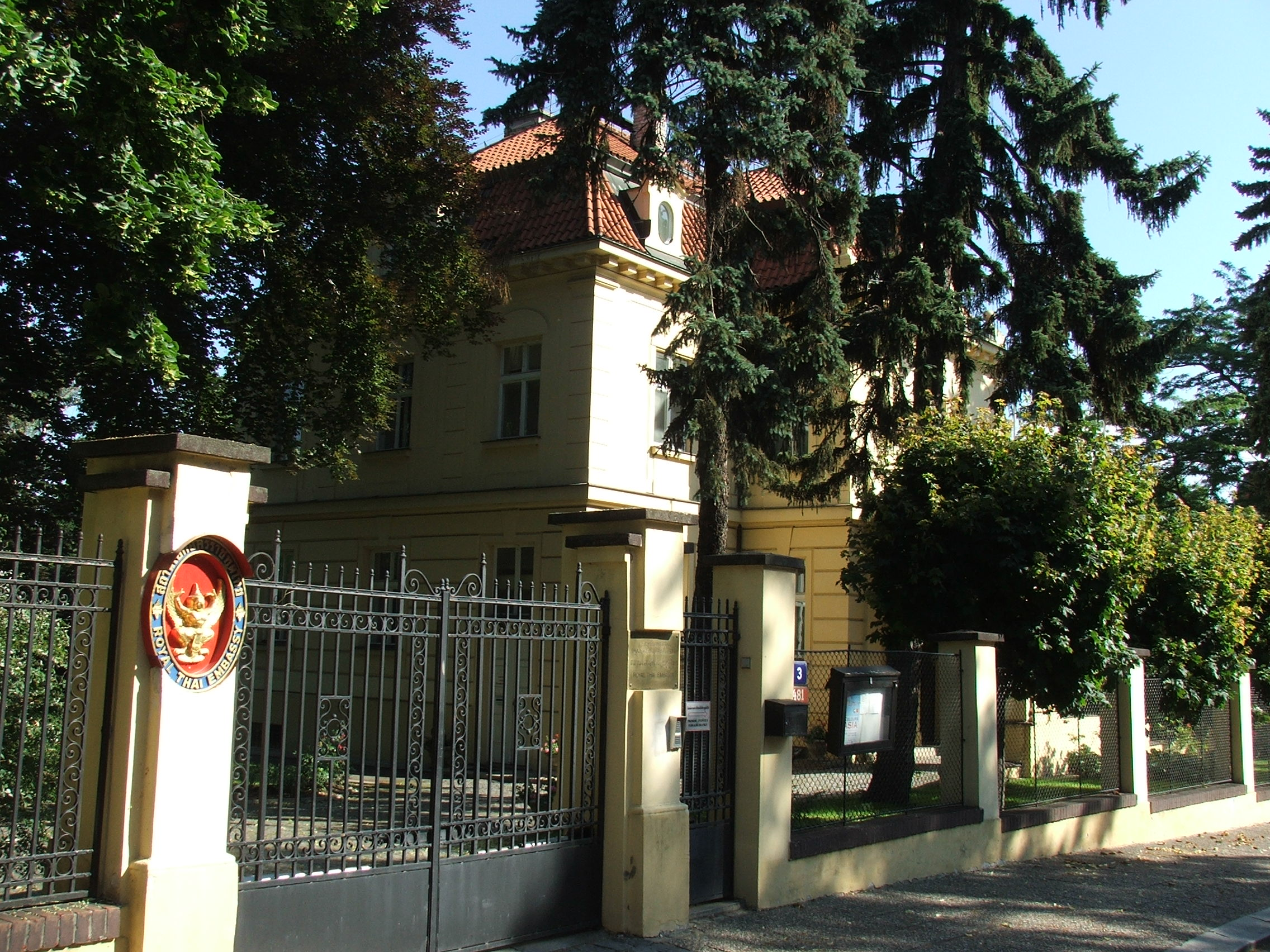
Embassy in Prague

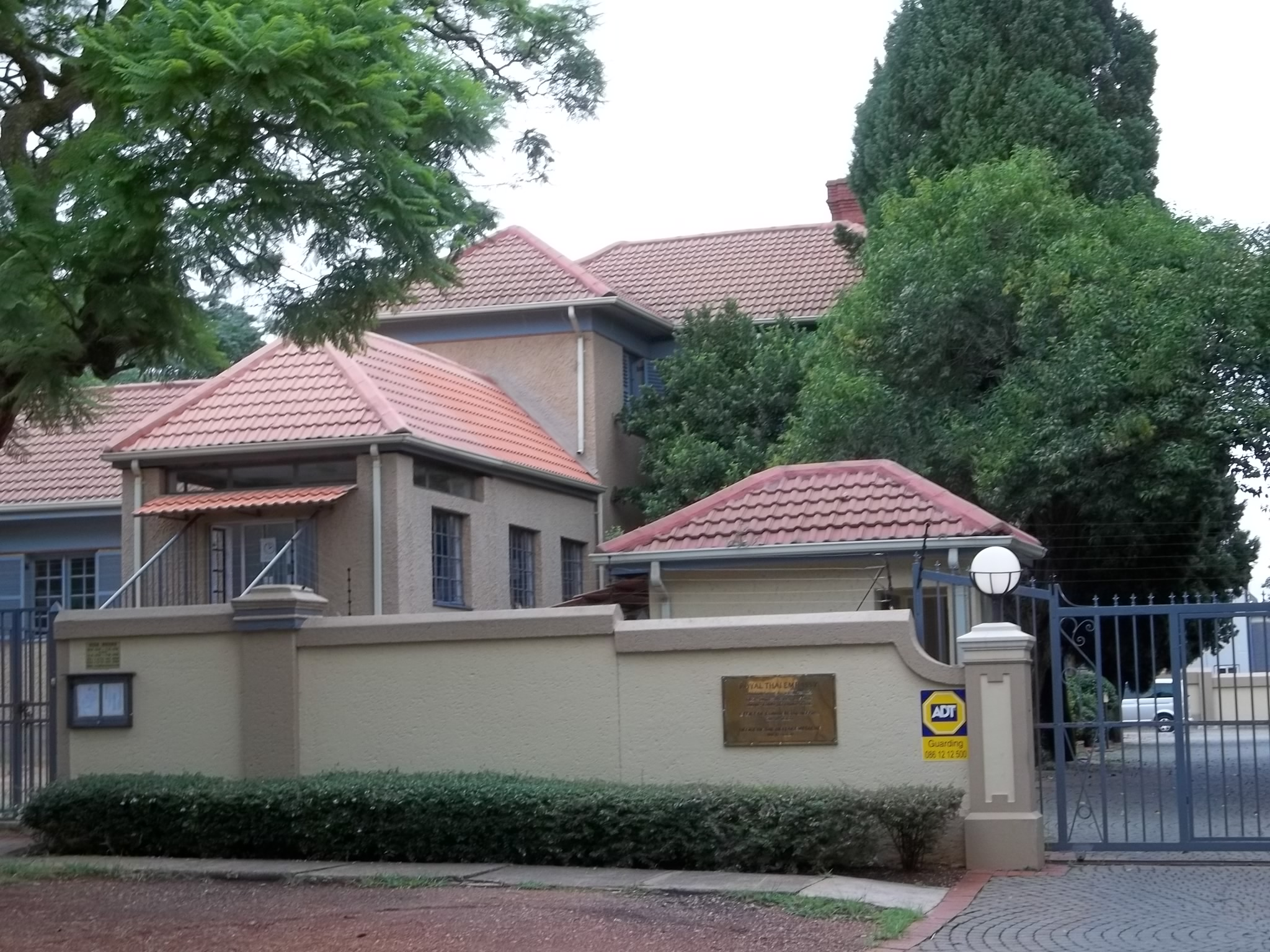
Embassy in Pretoria

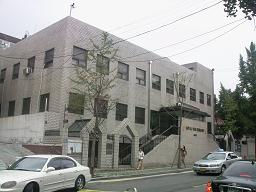
Embassy in Seoul

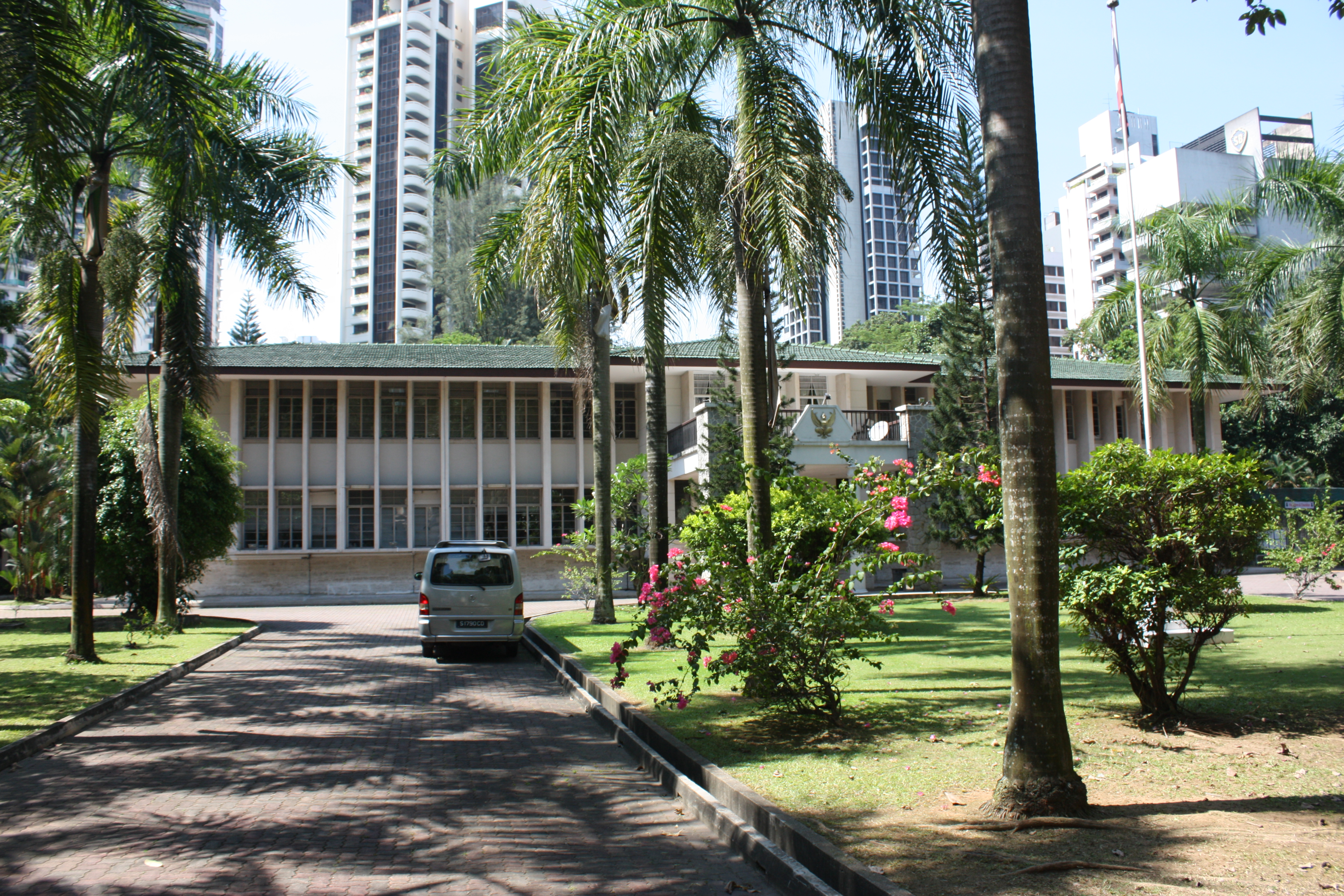
Embassy in Singapore

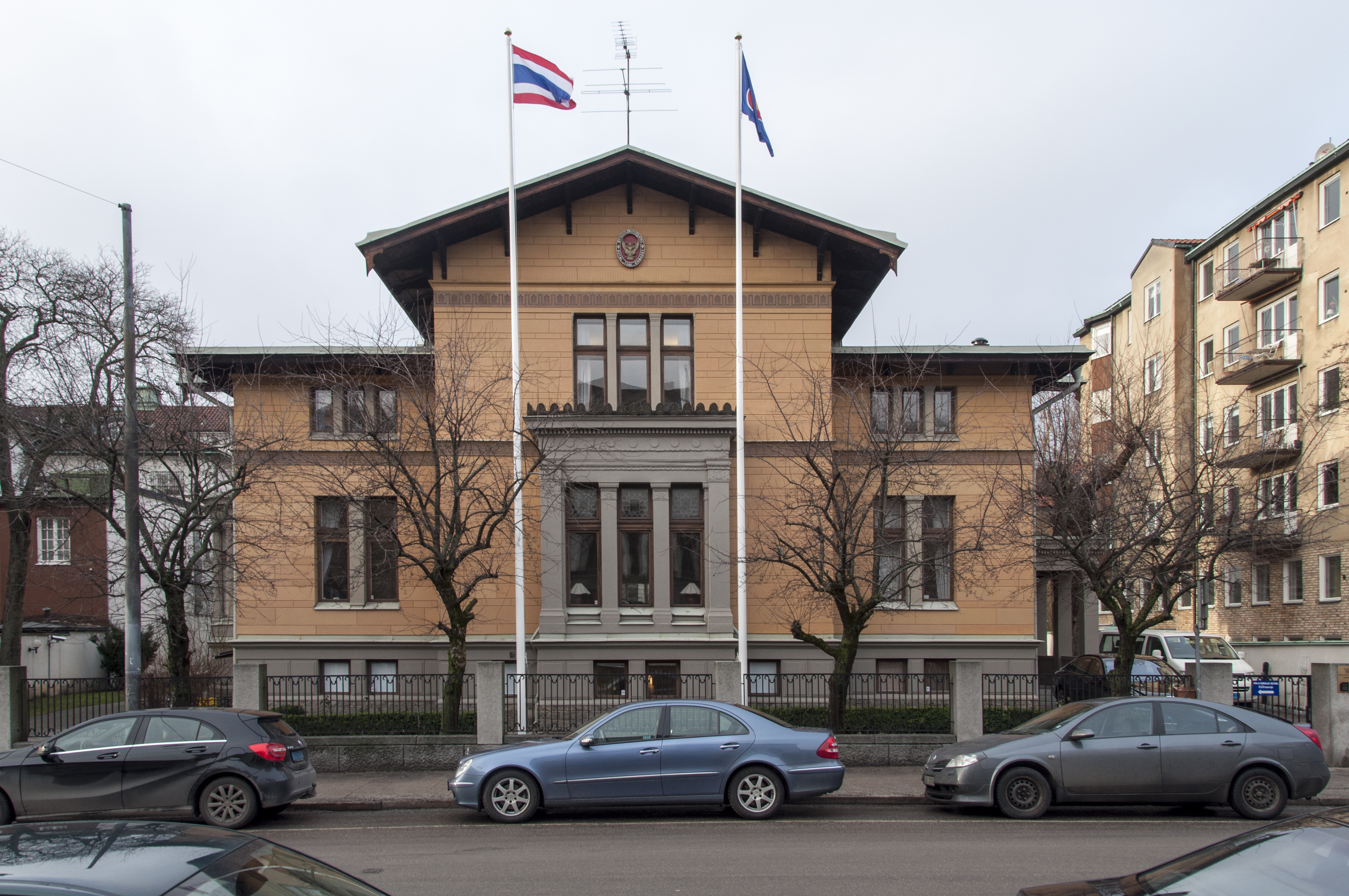
Embassy in Stockholm

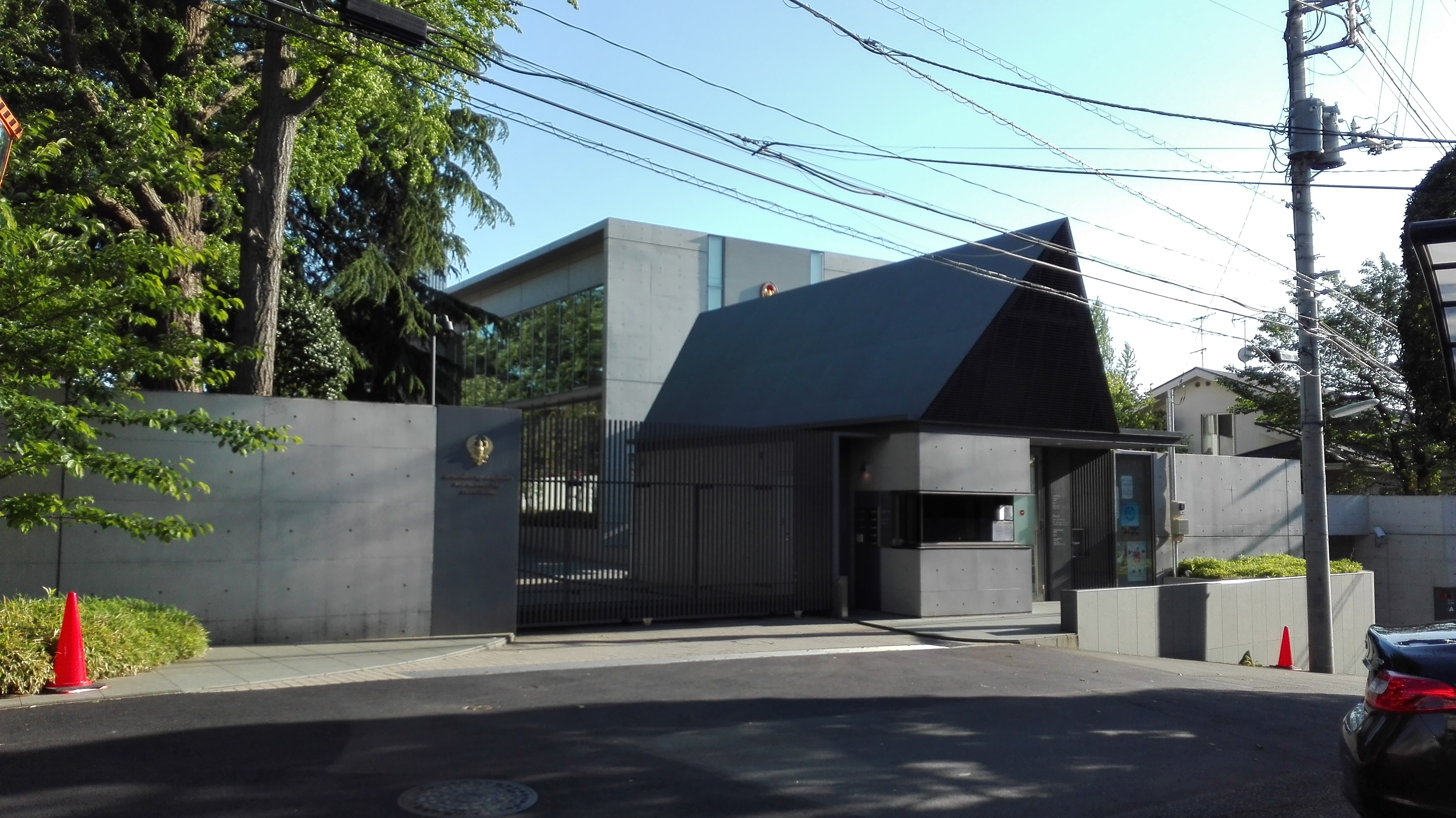
Embassy in Tokyo

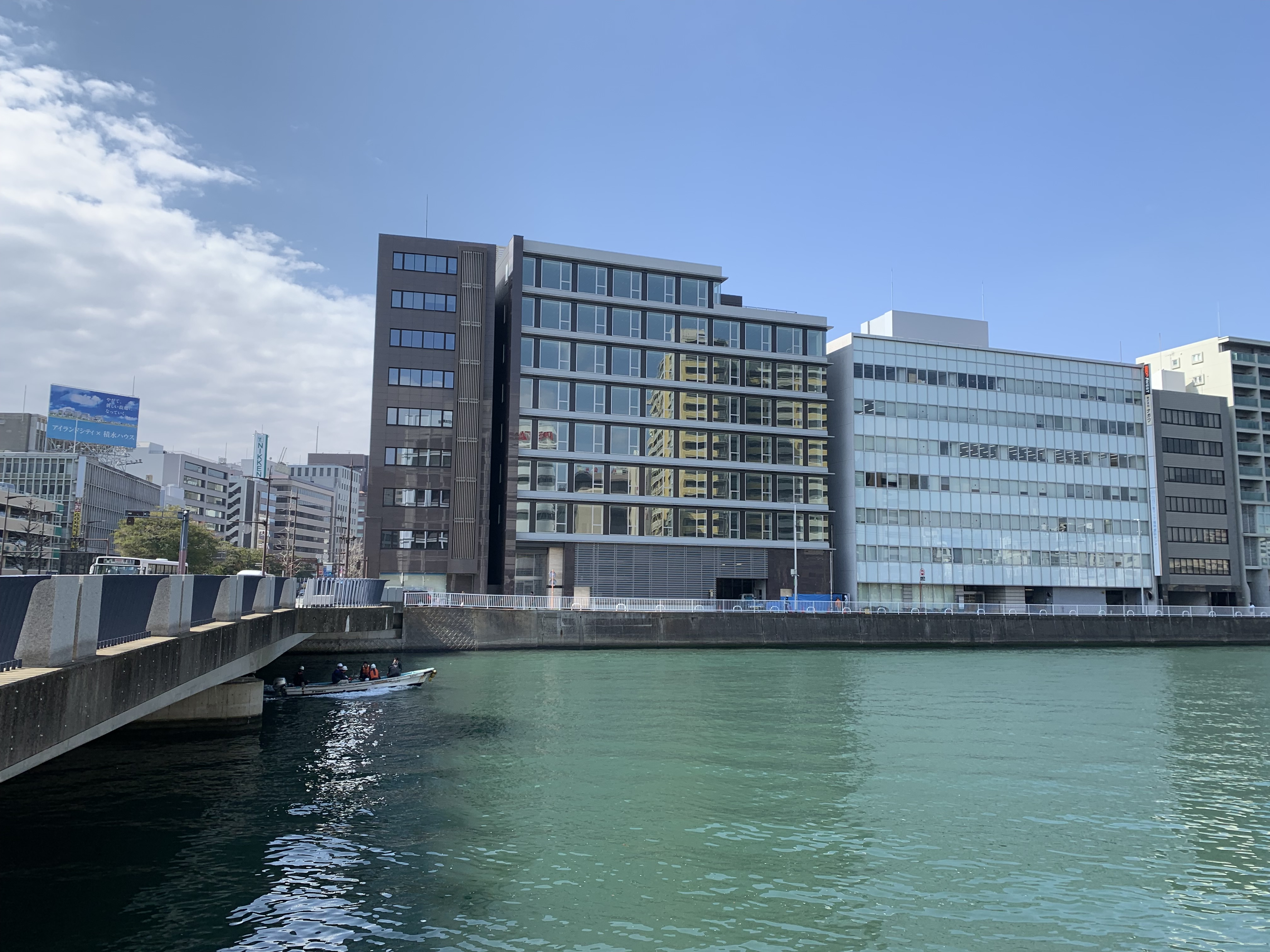
Consulate-General in Fukuoka

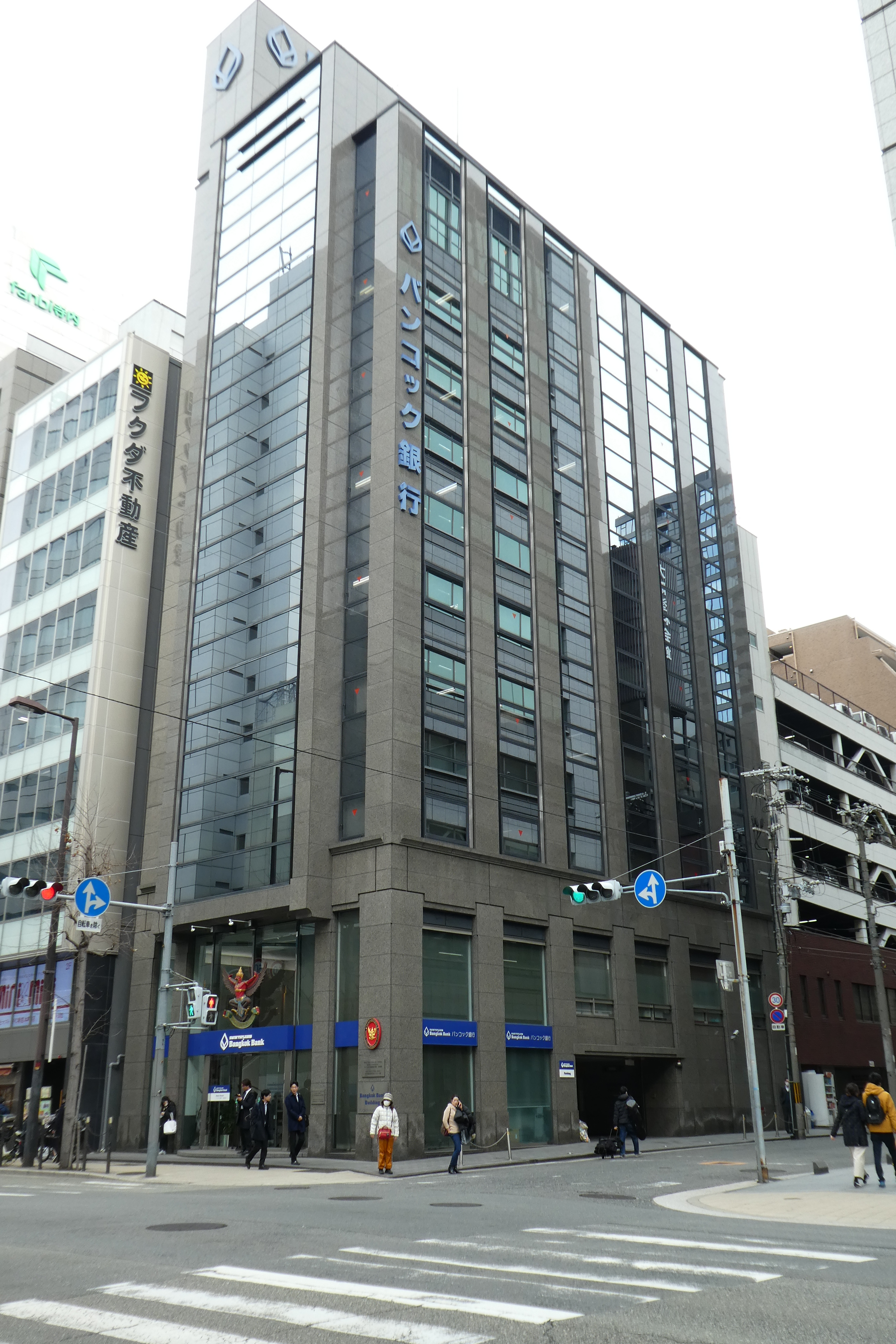
Consulate-General in Osaka

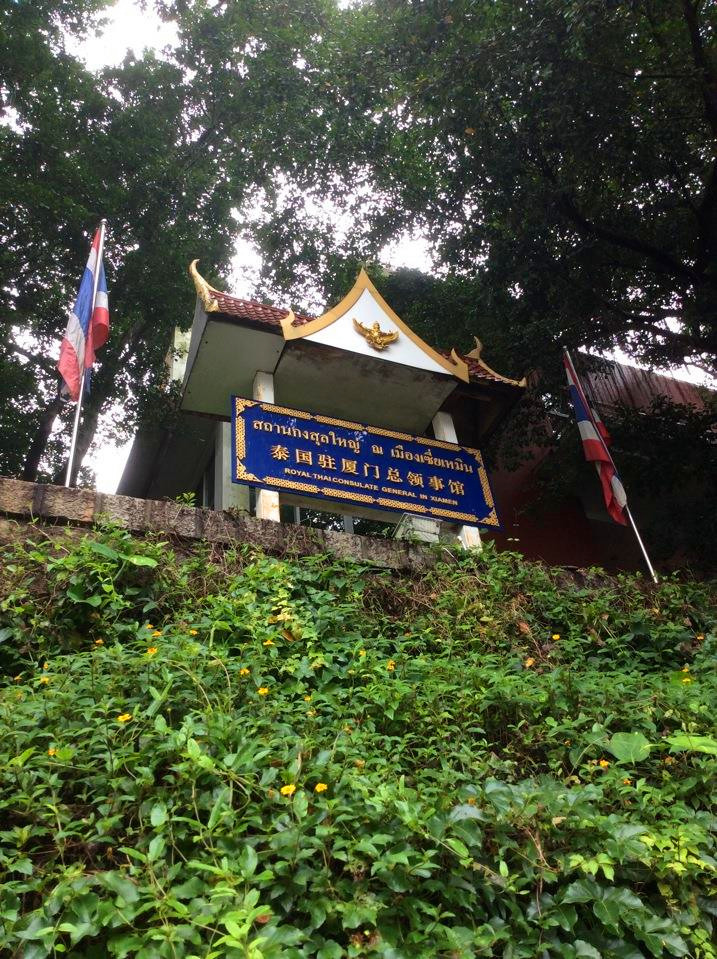
Consulate-General in Xiamen

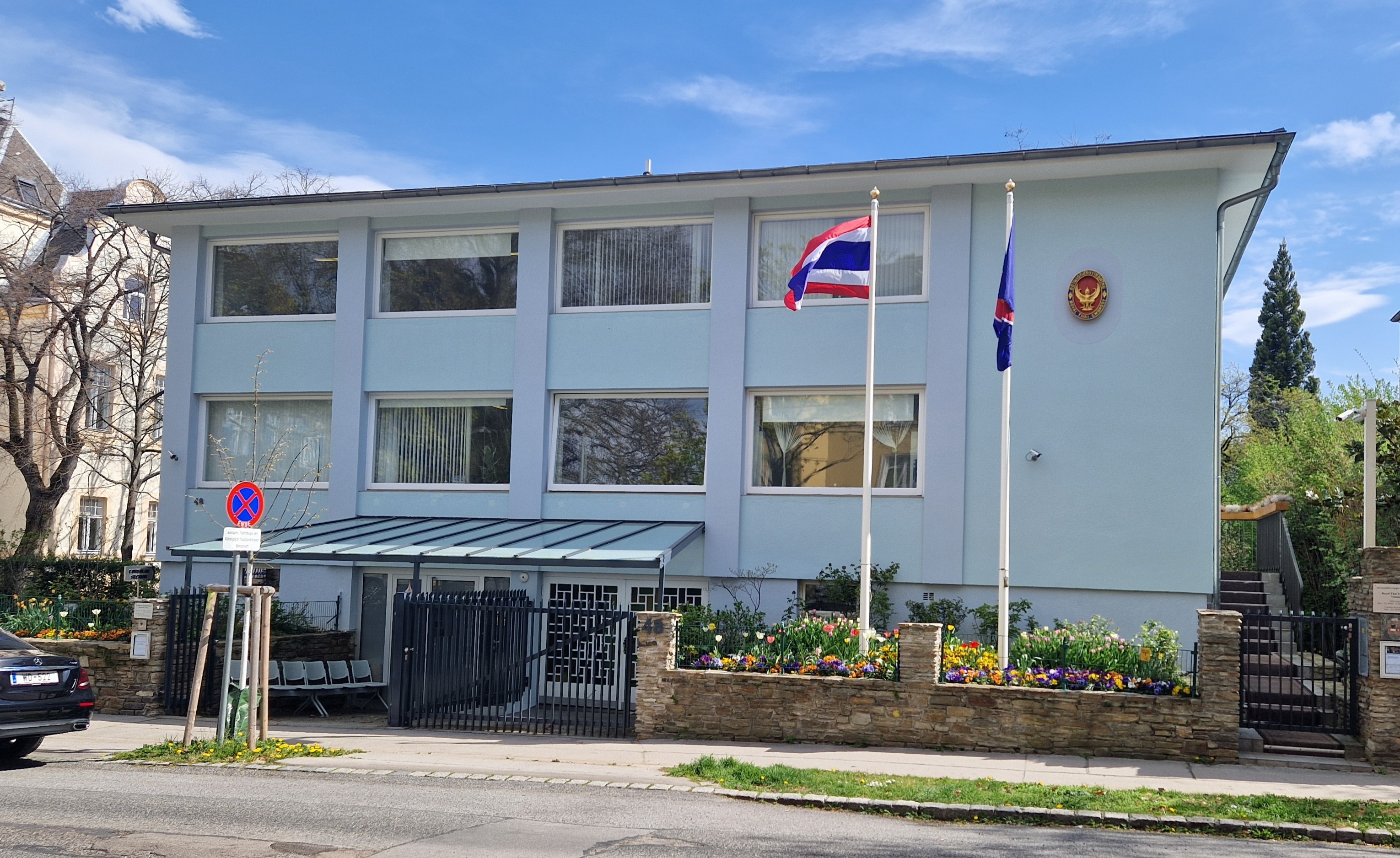
Embassy in Vienna

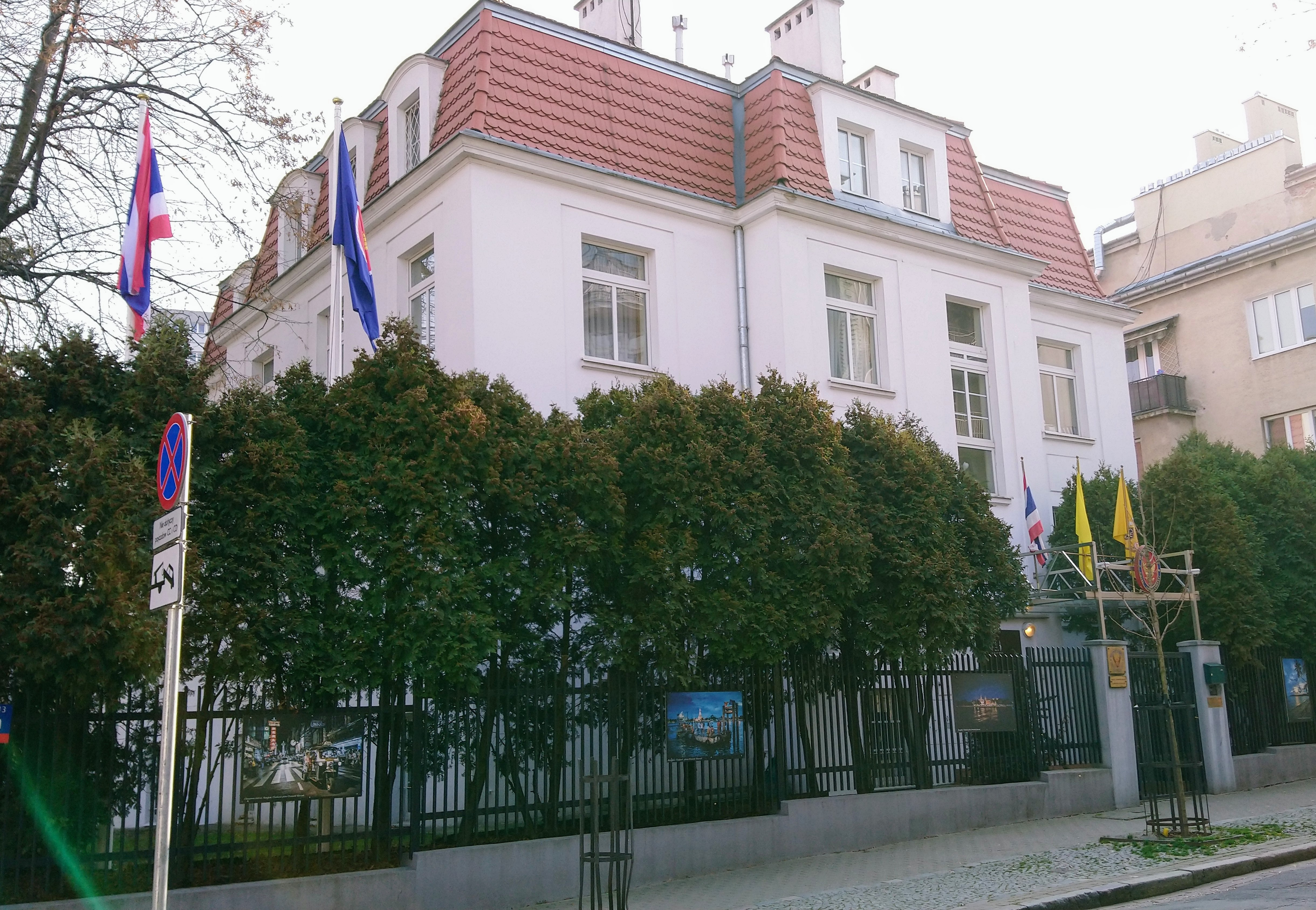
Embassy in Warsaw

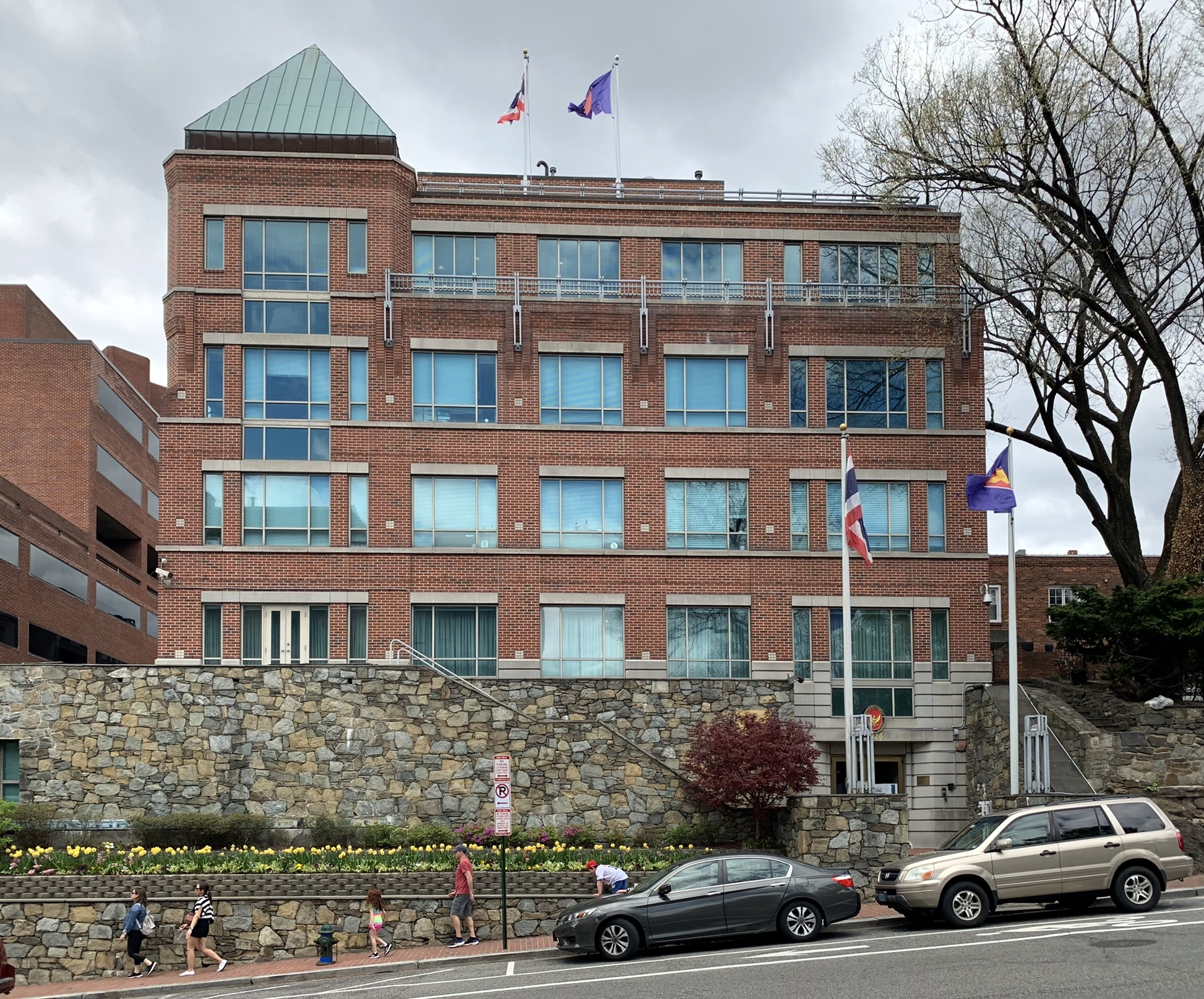
Embassy in Washington, D.C.

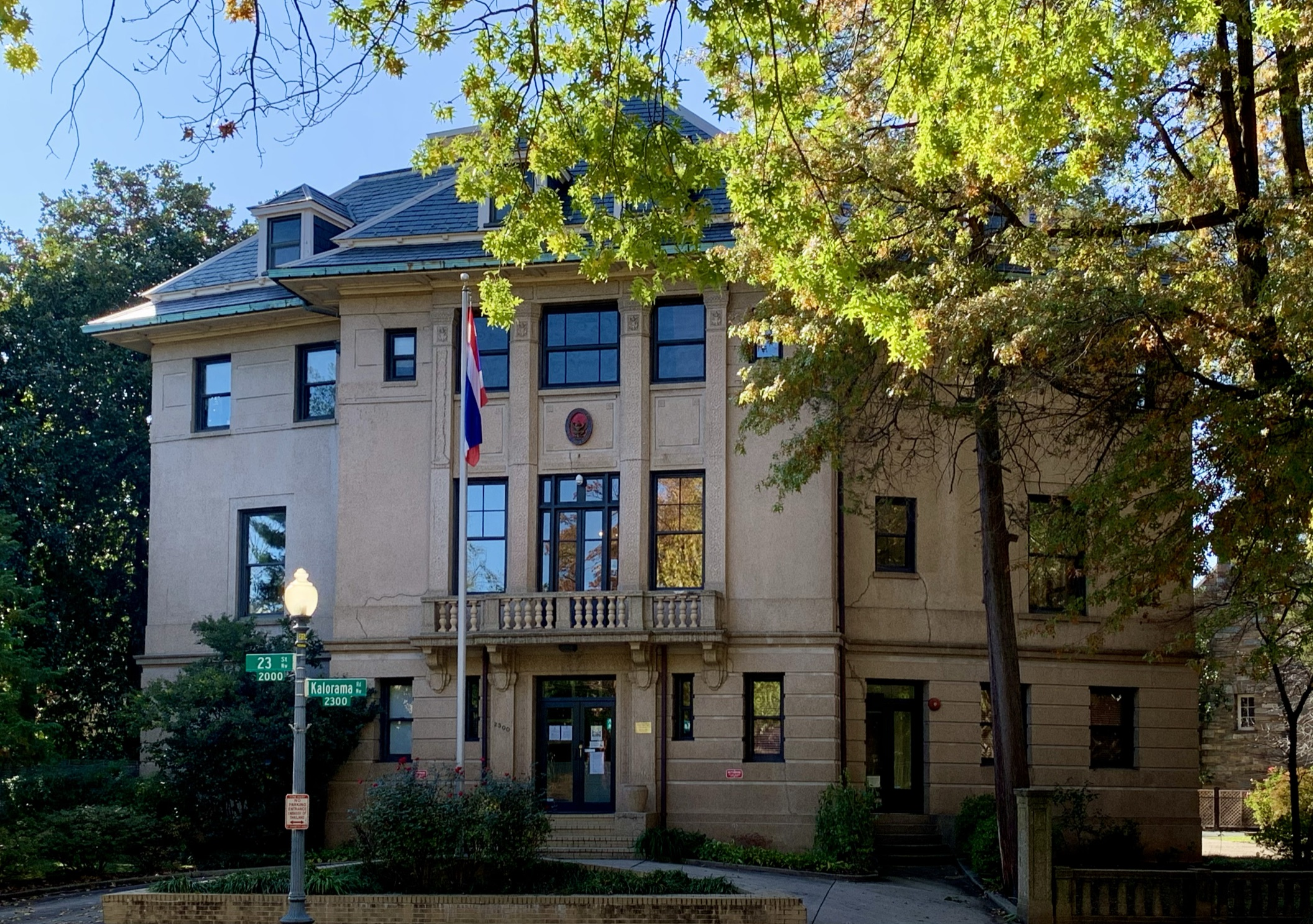
Consular section of the Embassy in Washington, D.C.

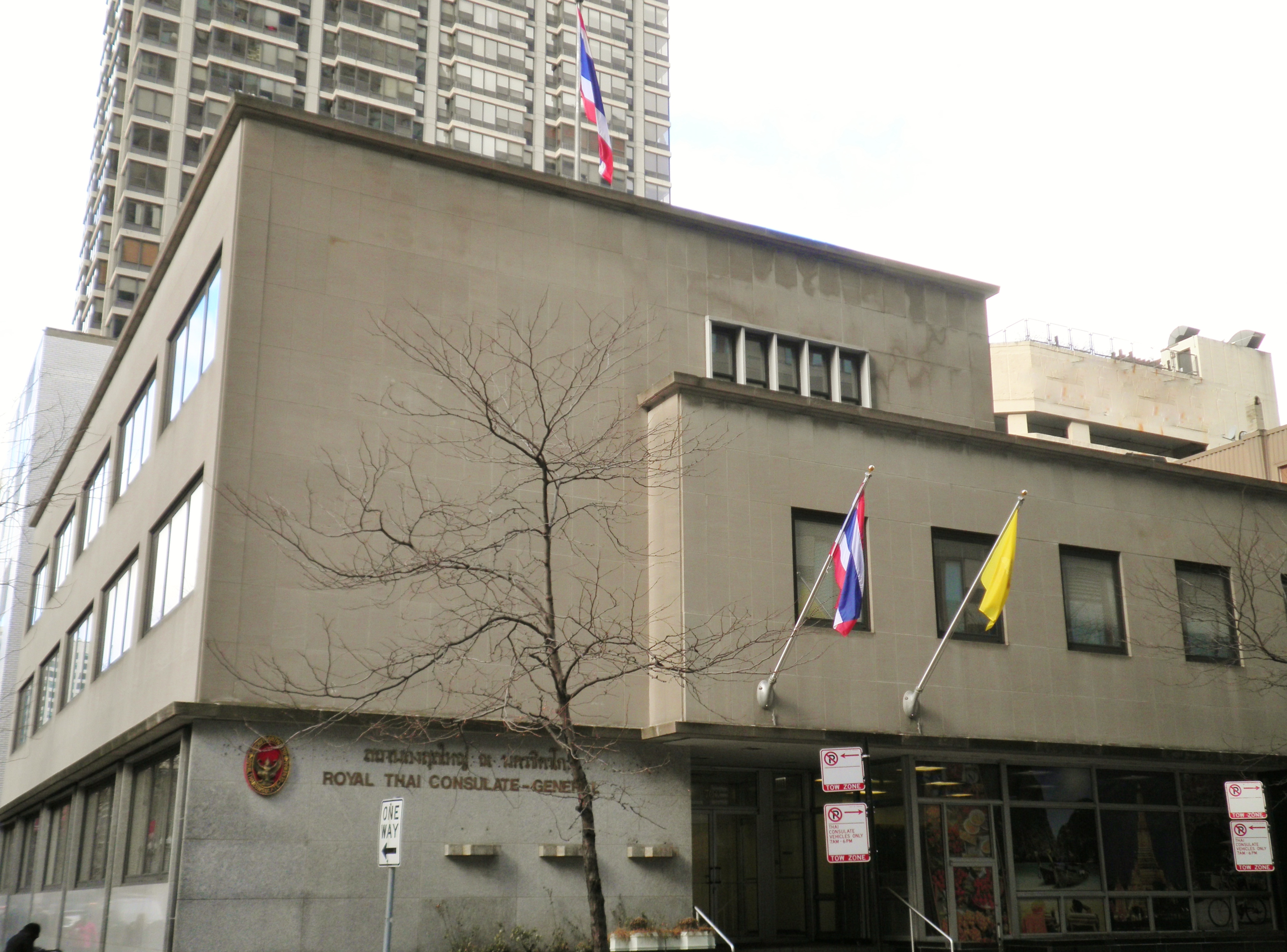
Consulate-General in Chicago

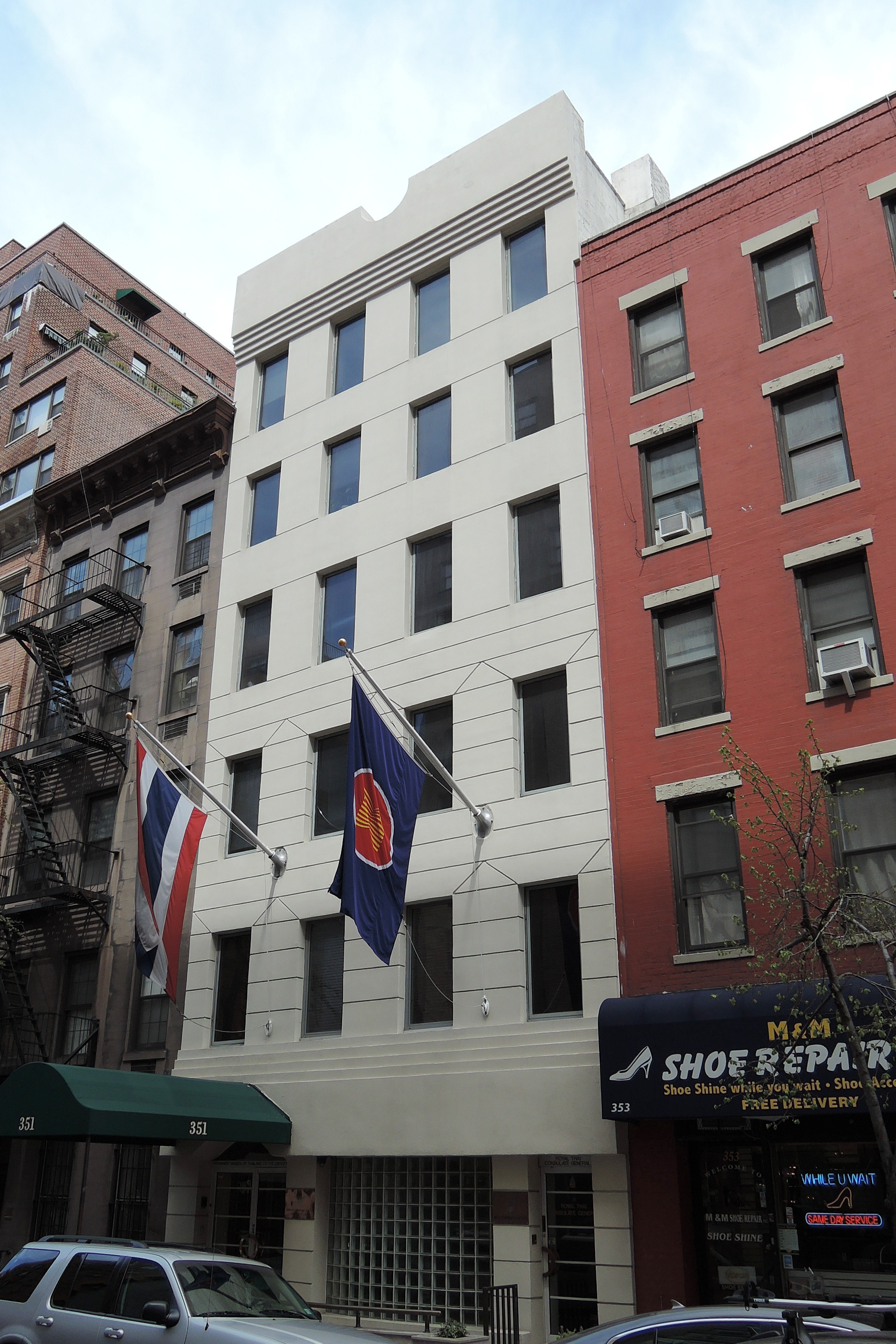
Consulate-General in New York City

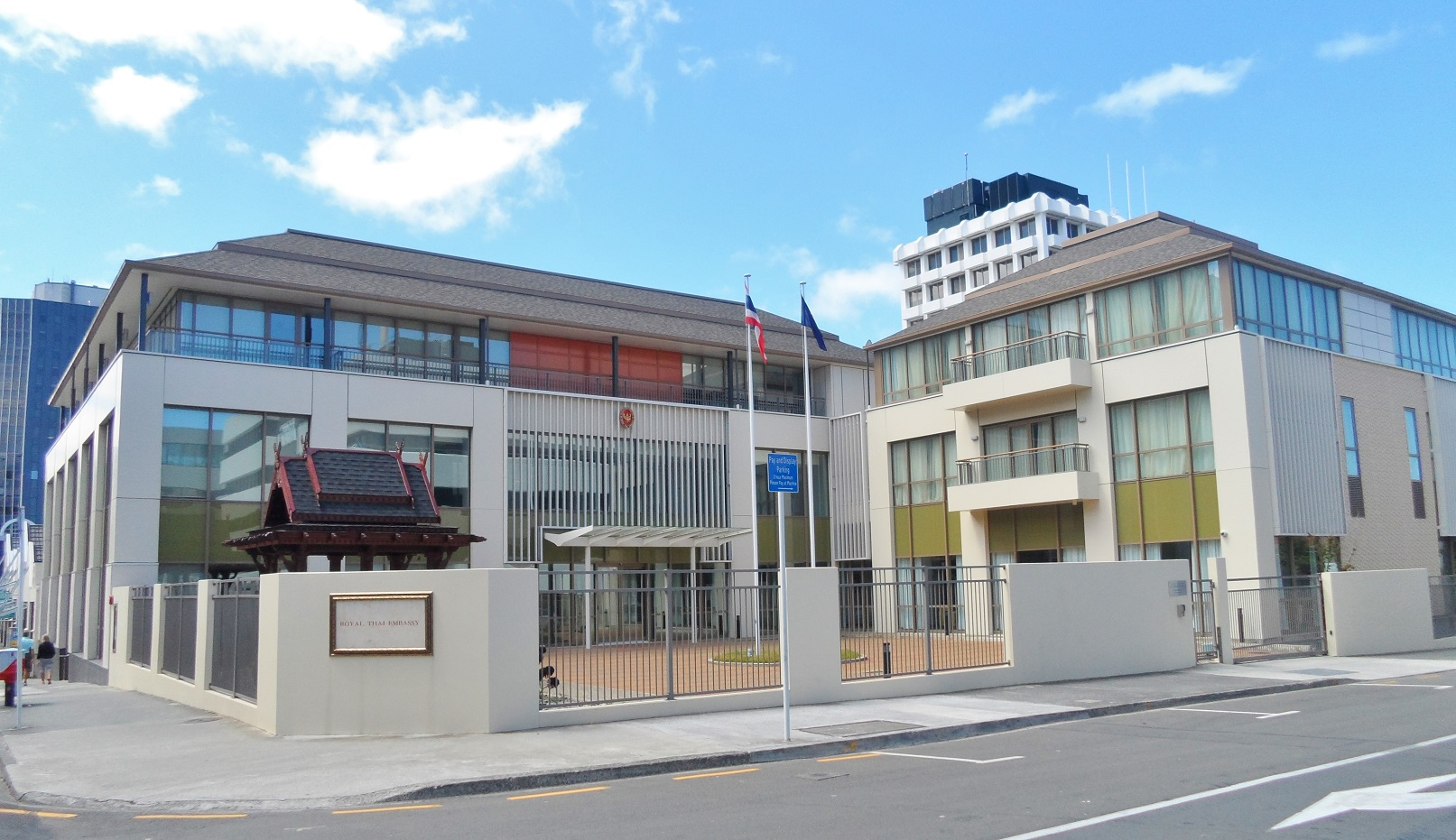
Embassy in Wellington

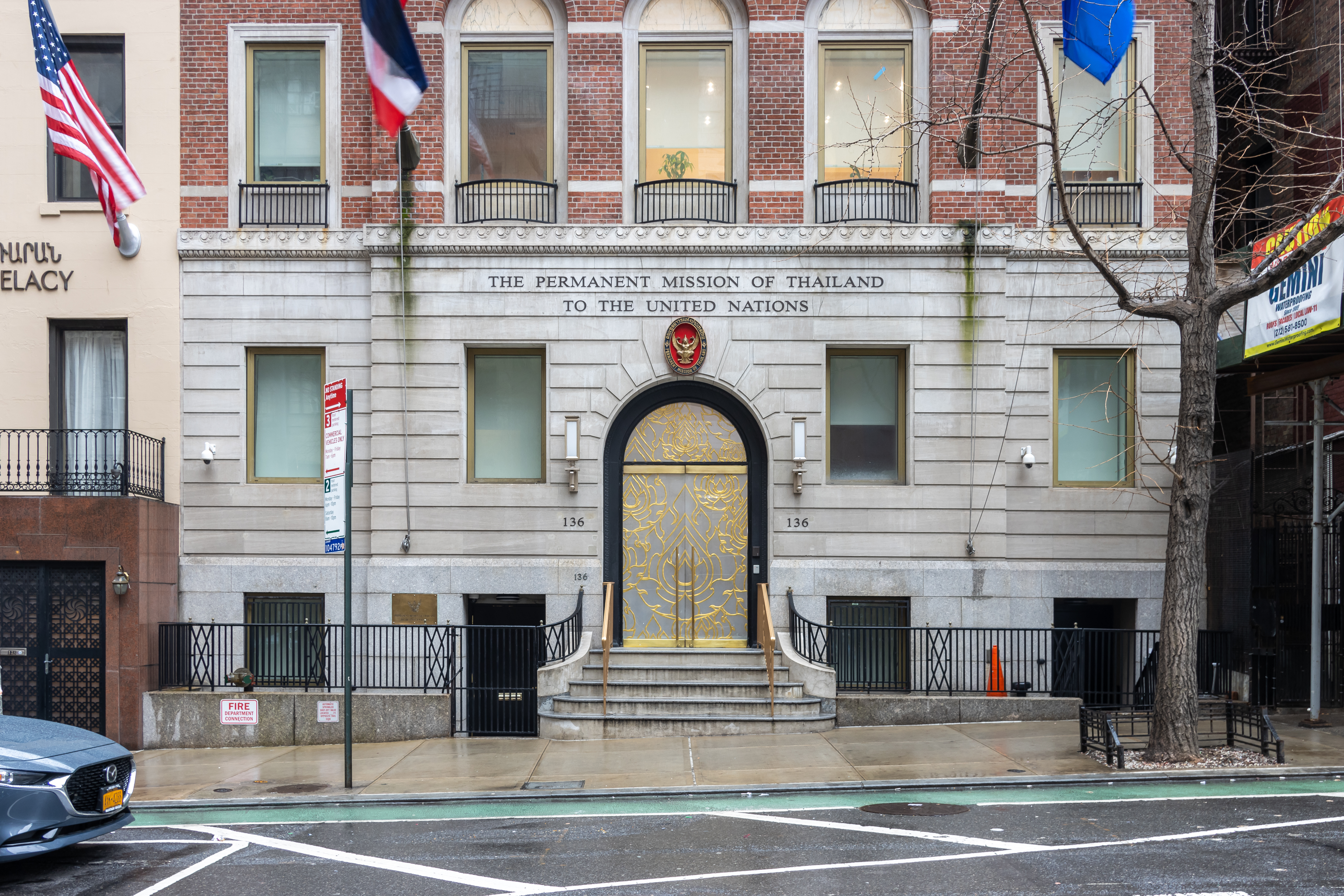
Permanent Mission to the United Nations in New York City

== Closed missions ==
=== Africa ===
| Host country | Host city | Mission | Year closed | Ref. |
|---|---|---|---|---|
| Ethiopia | Addis Ababa | Embassy (Note: Resident in Nairobi, Kenya) | 1981 | |
| Libya | Tripoli | Embassy | 2014 | |
| Madagascar | Antananarivo | Consulate-General | Unknown | |

=== Asia ===
| Host country | Host city | Mission | Year closed | Ref. |
|---|---|---|---|---|
| Burma | Kengtung | Consulate-General | 1977 | |
| Iraq | Baghdad | Embassy | Unknown | |
| Laos | Houayxay | Consulate | Unknown | |
| Laos | Pakse | Consulate | 1975 | |

=== Europe ===
| Host country | Host city | Mission | Year closed | Ref. |
|---|---|---|---|---|
| Yugoslavia | Belgrade | Embassy (Note: Serbian resident in Athens, Attica, Greece. Bosnian, Croatian, Montenegrin and Kosovan resident in Budapest, Hungary. Slovenian resident in Vienna, Austria. And a North Macedonian resident in Ankara, Türkiye.) | Unknown | |

== Flags ==
Thailand is one of the two countries, the other being the United Kingdom, that uses diplomatic flags abroad.

| Flag | Date | Use | Description |
|---|---|---|---|
| | 1927– | Ambassador's Standard | A blue disc containing a white elephant in regalia centred on the national flag. |
| | 1927– | Consular Flag | Triranga surmounted with blue disc containing a white elephant. |

== Mission to open ==
| Host country | Host city | Mission | Ref. |
|---|---|---|---|
| Ethiopia | Addis Ababa | Embassy | |

== See also ==
- Foreign relations of Thailand
- List of current ambassadors of Thailand
- List of diplomatic missions in Thailand
- Visa policy of Thailand
