= Embassy of Thailand, New Delhi =

Diplomatic mission of Thailand to India

Royal Thai Embassy, New Delhi
- Address: 56-N, Nyaya Marg, Chanakyapuri, New Delhi, Delhi 110021
- Coordinates: 28°35′21″N 77°10′55″E
- Ambassador: Chavanart Thangsumphant
- Jurisdiction: India; Bhutan
- Website: Official website

The Royal Thai Embassy in New Delhi is the diplomatic mission of Thailand to India, the ambassador being Pattarat Hongtong.

The embassy serves the Northern, Western, Central, Eastern and North-Eastern regions of India; it also includes Bhutan in its jurisdiction. Thailand also has a Consulate General in Chennai that serves the region of South India and is affiliated with the embassy.

== History ==
After establishing diplomatic relations between the countries on 1 August 1947, they each built consulates initially in corresponding capitals, and upgraded to post on 3 October 1951. Initial building was leased in Aurangzeb Road, later shifting it to present location. The ambassador's residence was constructed in 1955.

== List of ambassadors ==
The first ambassador to India was Thanat Khoman. Present ambassador is Ms. Patrat Hongthong.

#	Diplomat	Diplomatic accreditation	Notes and References
1	Thanat Khoman	1947-49	
2	Luang Pinit Alphabet (Wong Pinij Alphabet)	1949-52	
3	Lt. Gen. Luang Vijitwatkarn (Vijit Vijitwatkarn)	1952-53	
4	Luang Bhadravati (Supavara Warasiri)	1953-54	
5	Phra Bhahitthanukorn (Part Navaraj)	1955-57	
6	Bun Charoenchai	1957-59	
7	Sukit Nimmanhemin	1959-63	
8	Chitti Singhkul	1963-67	
9	Premburchat	1968-72	
10	Sermon Sutwathanruputhi	1972-75	
11	Suchart Judhasmit	1976-80	
12	Somboon Rojanakorn	1980-81	
13	Sumesorn Sirimongkol	1981-83	
14	Pirat Israsena	1983-87	
15	Nikkorn Prasangphet	1987-91	
16	Prapat Narinthrangoon	1991-93	
17	Vijay Wansin	1994-98	
18	Thawatchai Thaweesri	1998 - 2000	
19	B.D. Sothiplarit	2000-02	
20	Jirasak Thaneshanan	2002-08	
21	Krit Kraijitti	2009-12	
22	Pisan Manawapat	2011-13	
23	Chalit Manityakul	2013-16	
24	Chutinthorn Kongsak	2017-20	
25	Patrat Hongthong	2021-25	
26	Chavanart Thangsumphant	2025 – present	List of Thai ambassadors

== Events ==
The embassy organises various education, cultural and bilateral events as well.

The events are regional as well as bilateral basis.

== See also ==
- India–Thailand relations
- Consulate General of Thailand, Chennai
- List of ambassadors of Thailand to India
- List of diplomatic missions of Thailand
- List of diplomatic missions in India
- Foreign relations: India | Thailand
