= Permanent Representative of Thailand to the United Nations Office at Geneva =

Official representative of the Royal Thai Government

Coordinates: 46.219688°N 6.148453°E

- Inaugural holder: Chatichai Choonhavan
- Formation: 1967

The Thai Permanent Representative in Geneva is the official representative of the Royal Thai Government to the United Nations Office at Geneva.

== List of representatives ==
| Diplomatic agreement/designated/Diplomatic accreditation | Permanent Representative | Thai language | Observations | List of prime ministers of Thailand | Term end |
|---|---|---|---|---|---|
| 1967 | Chatichai Choonhavan | th:ชาติชาย ชุณหะวัณ | General, also accredited as Thai Ambassador to Switzerland. | Thanom Kittikachorn | 1972 |
| 1972 | Upadit Pachariyangkun | th:อุปดิศร์ ปาจรียางกูร | also accredited as Thai Ambassador to Switzerland. *From 1976 to 1980 he was Minister of Foreign Affairs | Thanom Kittikachorn | 1973 |
| 1973 | Wichian Wattanakun | | 1991 he was Thai Deputy Foreign Minister | Sanya Dharmasakti | 1975 |
| 1975 | Sudhee Prasasvinitchai | สุธี ประศาสน์วินิจฉัย | From 4 Nov. 1986 to 1988 he was Thai Ambassador to the United Kingdom. | Seni Pramoj | 1976 |
| 1976 | Manaspas Xuto | | From 1980 to 1981 he was Thai Ambassador to Austria.; From 23 June 1994 he was Thai Ambassador to the United States. | Seni Pramoj | 1980 |
| 1980 | Pracha Guna-Kasem | | | Prem Tinsulanonda | 1982 |
| 1982 | Chawan Chawanid | | From December 1, 1988 to 1990 he was Thai Ambassador to Australia.; From 1990 he was Thai Ambassador to Malaysia. | Prem Tinsulanonda | 1984 |
| 1984 | Nissai Vejjajiva | | | Prem Tinsulanonda | 1987 |
| 1987 | Chao Saicheua | | married with Mom Rajawongse Tajvarn Saicheua.: He was the first President of the Constitutional Court of Thailand. | Prem Tinsulanonda | 1990 |
| 1990 | Tej Bunnag | th:เตช บุนนาค | From June 14, 2000 to December 12, 2001 he was Thai Ambassador to the United States. | Chatichai Choonhavan | 1995 |
| 1995 | Krit Garnjana-Goonchorn | | From 2007 to 2008 he was Thai Ambassador to the United States. | Banharn Silpa-Archa | 2000 |
| 2000 | Virasakdi Futrakul | วีระศักดิ์ ฟูตระกูล | (*December, 23 1951): From 1991 to 1993 he was Thai Ambassador to Myanmar.; From 1994 to 1996 he was Thai Ambassador to Canada.; From 2004 to March 13, 2006 he was Thai Ambassador to France.; From March 13, 2006 to March 13, 2006 he was Thai Ambassador to the United States.; From December 2009 to he was Thai Ambassador to Japan.; Since 2016 he is Deputy Minister of Foreign Affairs. | Chuan Leekpai | 2002 |
| February 1, 2003 | Laxanachantorn Laohaphan | | Khunying | Thaksin Shinawatra | December 1, 2003 |
| January 1, 2004 | Chaiyong Satjipanon | ชัยยงค์ สัจจิพานนท์ | | Thaksin Shinawatra | March 1, 2007 |
| April 1, 2007 | Sihasak Phuangketkeow | | | Surayud Chulanont | July 4, 1905 |
| February 1, 2012 | Pisanu Chanvitan | พิษณุ จันทร์วิทัน | From 04 March, 2005 to 2007 he was Thai Ambassador to Pakistan.; From Oct 8, 2009 to 2010 he was Thai Ambassador to Vietnam.; From 2012 to 2015 he is Thai Ambassador to Laos | Yingluck Shinawatra | October 1, 2012 |
| October 1, 2012 | Thani Thongphakdi | | | Yingluck Shinawatra | March 1, 2017 |
| March 1, 2017 | Sek Wannamethee | | | Prayut Chan-o-cha | August 22, 2023 |
| February 29, 2024 | Usana Berananda | | | Srettha Thavisin Paetongtharn Shinawatra | |
