= List of ambassadors of Thailand to Belgium =

Coordinates: 50.805183°N 4.372278°E

Ambassador of Thailand to Belgium
- Incumbent; Kanchana Patarachoke since May 30, 2024
- Inaugural holder: Vongsamahip Jayankura
- Formation: January 1, 1958

The Thai Ambassador in the City of Brussels is the official representative of the Government in Bangkok to the Government of Belgium and the European Union.

== List of representatives ==
Diplomatic agreement/designated/Diplomatic accreditation	Buddhist calendar	Ambassador	Thai language	Observations	List of prime ministers of Thailand	Prime Minister of Belgium	Term end	Buddhist calendar
January 1, 1958	2505	Vongsamahip Jayankura	หม่อมเจ้าวงษ์มหิป ชยางกูร	Prince Vongsamahip Jayankura (* April 19, 1909 Bangkok): 1932 Licencie and Doctoral en Sciences Pedagogique from the Universite Libre de Bruxelles.; defended the Temple of Preah Vihear case	Thanom Kittikachorn	Gaston Eyskens	19632506	
December 17, 1963	2506	Luang Dithakar Bhakdi	หลวงดิฐการภักดี	1948-1952 he was Thai Ambassador to Switzerland; 1937-1942: Siamaese minister to the League of Nations.	Thanom Kittikachorn	Théo Lefèvre	19662509	
November 5, 1968	2511	Phairot Jayanama	ไพโรจน์ ชัยนาม		Thanom Kittikachorn	Gaston Eyskens	19702513	
January 197,001	2513	Sompong Sucharitkul	สมปอง สุจริตกุล	(* December 4, 1931 in Bangkok) Son of Phra Phibul Aisawan and Khun Sopha Sucharitkul.	Thanom Kittikachorn	Gaston Eyskens	19732516	
July 23, 1974	2517	Padung Padamasankh	ผดุง ปัทมะสังข์		Sanya Dharmasakti	Leo Tindemans	19772520	
July 25, 1977	2520	Arsa Sarasin	อาสา สารสิน		Kriangsak Chomanan	Leo Tindemans	19802523	
January 19, 1981	2524	Thepkamol Devakula	th:หม่อมราชวงศ์เทพ เทวกุล		Prem Tinsulanonda	Mark Eyskens	19842527	
November 23, 1984	2527	Vitthya Vejjajiva	วิทยา เวชชาชีวะ	(*December 30, 1936 in Bangkok): From 1979 to 1980 he was Director of General of Department of Economic Affairs.; From 1981 to 1983 he was Thai Ambassador to Canada.; From 1984 to 1987 he was Ambassador in City of Brussels.; From 1988 to he was Thai Ambassador to the United States.; From 1991 to 1992 he was Permanent Secretary of the Ministry of Foreign Affairs.	Prem Tinsulanonda	Wilfried Martens	19882531	
January 24, 1989	2532	Danai Tulalamba	ดนัย ดุลละลัมพะ		Chatichai Choonhavan	Wilfried Martens	19932536	
June 28, 1994	2537	Somkiati Ariyapruchya	สมเกียรติ อริยปรัชญา		Suchinda Kraprayoon	Jean-Luc Dehaene	19982541	
September 17, 1998	2541	Sukhum Rasmidata	สุขุม รัศมิทัต		Chuan Leekpai	Jean-Luc Dehaene	19992542	
August 1, 2000	2543	Surapong Posayanond	สุรพงษ์ โปษยานนท์		Chuan Leekpai	Guy Verhofstadt	20042547	
October 6, 2005	2548	Don Pramudwinai	นายดอน ปรมัตถ์วินัย		Thaksin Shinawatra	Guy Verhofstadt	20072550	
May 30, 2007	2550	Pisan Manawapat	พิศาล มานวพัฒน์		Surayud Chulanont	Guy Verhofstadt	20112554	
October 28, 2011	2554	Apichart Chinwanno	อภิชาติ ชินวรรโณ	since November 2013. he is Thai Ambassador to France and Permanent Delegate to UNESCO	Yingluck Shinawatra	Yves Leterme	20132556	
October 9, 2014	2557	Nopadol Gunavibool	นพปฎล คุณวิบูลย์		Prayut Chan-o-cha	Elio Di Rupo	December 1, 2015	
February 2, 2016	2559	บุษยา มาทแล็ง	บุษยา มาทแล็ง	Later the first female Permanent Secretary of the Ministry of Foreign Affairs (2016–2020)	Prayut Chan-o-cha	Charles Michel	September 30, 20162559	
2017	2560	Manasvi Srisodapol	มนัสวี ศรีโสดาพล		Prayut Chan-o-cha	Charles Michel	January 20212564	
April 2021	2564	Sek Wannamethee	เสข วรรณเมธี		Prayut Chan-o-cha	Alexander De Croo	December 20232566	
May 30, 2024	2567	Kanchana Patarachoke	กาญจนา ภัทรโชค		Srettha Thavisin	Alexander De Croo		
