= List of ambassadors of Thailand to Switzerland =

Coordinates: 46.930992°N 7.432502°E

Ambassador of Thailand to Switzerland
- Incumbent; Pannabha Chandraramya since March 18, 2025
- Inaugural holder: Nawarat Phahitta
- Formation: November 2, 1937

The Thai Ambassador in Bern is the official representative of the Government in Bangkok to the Government of Switzerland, the Holy See and Liechtenstein.

== List of representatives ==
Agrément/designated/Diplomatic accreditation	Ambassador	Thai language	Observations	List of prime ministers of Thailand	List of presidents of the Swiss Confederation	Term end
November 2, 1937	Nawarat Phahitta	เนาวรัตน์พะโต๊ะ		Phraya Phahon Phonphayuhasena	Giuseppe Motta	January 1, 1946
November 2, 1937	Phra Bahiddha Nukara			Phraya Phahon Phonphayuhasena	Giuseppe Motta	
January 1, 1946	Phra Bahiddha Nukara		he was First Secretary of Legation in London, from 1943 to 1965 he was Thai Ambassador to Portugal.	Kuang Abhayawongse	Karl Kobelt	
September 17, 1948	Luang Dithakar Bhakdi		Minister, In 1942, he was Second Secretary of the Royal Thai Legation in Washington, D.C.; In 1964 he was Thai Ambassador to Belgium	Phibul Songkhram	Enrico Celio	December 26, 1952
January 1, 1951	Banchop H. Siriphol		Attaché	Phibul Songkhram	Eduard von Steiger	January 1, 1953
December 26, 1952	Bhusana Abhorn Krairiksh		Chargé d'affaires	Phibul Songkhram	Karl Kobelt	May 7, 1953
May 7, 1953	Luang Wichitwathakan	th:หลวงวิจิตรวาทการ (วิจิตร วิจิตรวาทการ)		Phibul Songkhram	Philipp Etter	January 1, 1959
January 1, 1954	Banchop H. Siriphol		Chargé d'affaires	Phibul Songkhram	Rodolphe Rubattel	January 1, 1955
July 23, 1959	Chitti Sucharitakul		(born March 4, 1908, at Dhonburi) he was the son of the late H. E. Choaphya Sudham Montri and Than Phuying Sudham Montri. His father was a learned government official who had been holding the high position of president of the Court of Foreign Courses of Thailand. As of 1957, his mother was still living	Sarit Dhanarajata	Paul Chaudet	January 1, 1964
September 11, 1964	Cheed Sreshthaputra			Thanom Kittikachorn	Ludwig von Moos	January 1, 1967
June 21, 1968	Chatichai Choonhavan			Thanom Kittikachorn	Willy Spühler	January 1, 1972
October 6, 1972	Upadit Pachariyangkun			Thanom Kittikachorn	Nello Celio	December 12, 1973
January 18, 1974	Sangkadis Diskul			Sanya Dharmasakti	Ernst Brugger	November 1, 1976
1976	Wisan Thipkomut		Chargé d'affaires	Seni Pramoj	Rudolf Gnägi	1977
June 3, 1977	Klos Visessurakarn			Kriangsak Chomanan	Kurt Furgler	
1978	Wisan Thipkomut		Chargé d'affaires	Kriangsak Chomanan	Willy Ritschard	1979
August 31, 1978	Varachit Nitibhon			Kriangsak Chomanan	Willy Ritschard	1983
1984	Owart Suthiwart-Narueput			Prem Tinsulanonda	Leon Schlumpf	1985
1986	Montri Jalichandra			Prem Tinsulanonda	Alphons Egli	1987
1988	Somboon Sangiambut			Chatichai Choonhavan	Otto Stich	1990
1990	Sumniang Chulakanista		Chargé d'affaires	Chatichai Choonhavan	Arnold Koller	1991
1991	Sinthu Sorasongkram			Anand Panyarachun	Flavio Cotti	1994
1994	Vidhya Rayananonda			Suchinda Kraprayoon	Otto Stich	1994
1995	Don Pramudwinai			Banharn Silpa-Archa	Kaspar Villiger	1999
1999	Ronarong Nopakun			Chuan Leekpai	Ruth Dreifuss	2001
2002	Jullapong Nonsrichai			Thaksin Shinawatra	Kaspar Villiger	2004
2004	Pradap Pibulsonggram			Thaksin Shinawatra	Joseph Deiss	2006
2006	Patchanee Kithavorn		Chargé d'affaires	Surayud Chulanont	Moritz Leuenberger	2007
2007	Chaiyong Satjipanon	ชัยยงค์ สัจจิพานนท		Surayud Chulanont	Micheline Calmy-Rey	2010
2010	Kesinee Rojdenduang		Chargé d'affaires	Samak Sundaravej	Doris Leuthard	2011
2010	Rathakit Manathat	th:รัฐกิจ มานะทัต		Samak Sundaravej	Doris Leuthard	2011
2011	Arbhorn Manasvanich		From February 4, 2010, to 2011 she was Thai Ambassador to Turkey.	Yingluck Shinawatra	Micheline Calmy-Rey	2012
2012	Chalermpol Thanchitt			Yingluck Shinawatra	Eveline Widmer-Schlumpf	2015
2015	Twekiat Janprajak		Chargé d'affaires	Prayut Chan-o-cha	Simonetta Sommaruga	2016
2016	Nopadol Gunavibool			Prayut Chan-o-cha	Johann Schneider-Ammann	2016
2016	Jaithai Upakarnitikaset		Chargé d'affaires	Prayut Chan-o-cha	Johann Schneider-Ammann	
December 7, 2016	Kittiphong Na Ranong	นายกิตติพงษ์ ณ ระนอง	From June 9, 2015, to December 7, 2016 he was Thai Ambassador to the United Kingdom.	Prayut Chan-o-cha	Johann Schneider-Ammann	2018
April 10, 2018	Chakri Srichawana	นายจักรี ศรีชวนะ	Previously Director-General of the Department of Protocol	Prayut Chan-o-cha	Alain Berset	2021
April 5, 2022	Chittipat Tongprasroeth	นายจิตติพัฒน์ ทองประเสริฐ	Later Ambassador to Germany (2025)	Prayut Chan-o-cha	Ignazio Cassis	2025
March 18, 2025	Pannabha Chandraramya	นางสาวพรรณนภา จันทรารมย์	Formerly Ambassador to Israel	Paetongtarn Shinawatra	Karin Keller-Sutter	

- Switzerland–Thailand relations
