= Thailand–United Kingdom relations =

- Thailand: United Kingdom

Diplomatic mission
- Embassy of Thailand, London: Embassy of the United Kingdom, Bangkok

Envoy
- Ambassador Thani Thongphakdi: Ambassador Mark Gooding

Bilateral relations between Thailand and the United Kingdom date to the 17th century. Thailand has an embassy in London and the UK has an embassy in Bangkok.

In 1608, an English captain William Keeling met an ambassador of King Ekathotsarot of Siam in Banten. During the 17th century the English East India Company first arrived and established factories in the Ayutthaya Kingdom. In 1612, British merchants delivered a letter from King James I to King Ekathotsarot in regards to trade and establishing relations. The British merchants were welcomed warmly by the King. Later, in the 19th century, Britain became, along with France, one of the two major colonial powers exerting pressure on Siam, when it colonised Burma and Malaya to Siam's west and south. During this period, Britain gained significant concessions from Siam through various treaties, including the Burney Treaty in 1826 and the Bowring Treaty in 1855, which remained in effect until after the first World War. Britain directly and indirectly had a massive amount of influence on Siam's modernisation during the late 19th early to early 20th centuries, and the two countries remain important trade partners to the present day.

== History ==
=== Ayutthaya and England ===
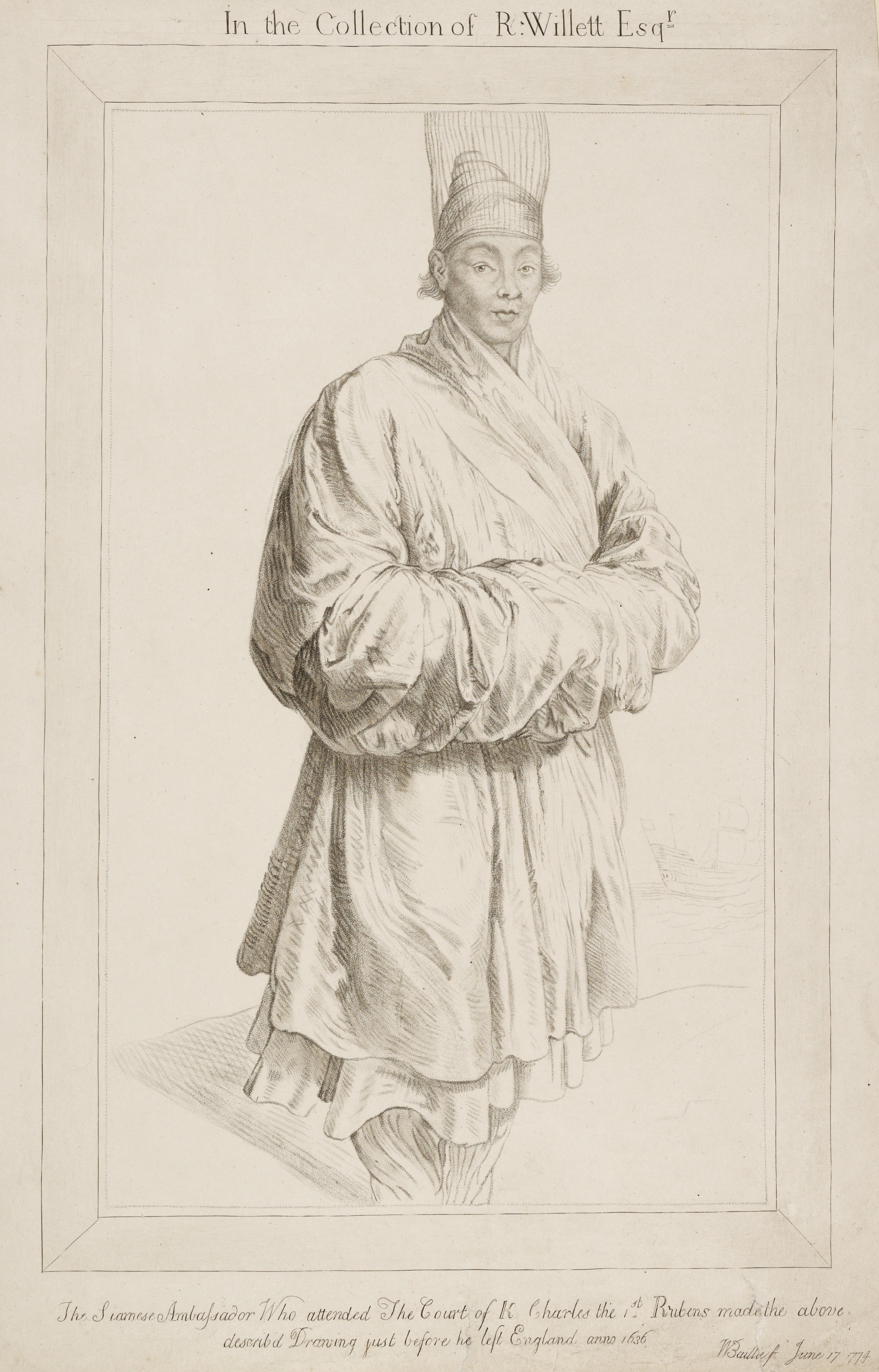
Siamese Ambassador at the Court of King Charles I of England 1636

The kingdom of the Siamese has been known to the West since 1430; when the Italian Niccolò de' Conti first visited Tenasserim, then part of the Kingdom of Sukhothai. The first known Briton recorded to have set foot in the area that is now modern Thailand was Ralph Fitch who arrived in Chiang Mai (referred to as Lamahey in his account) in 1586. Fitch described the city as: "a very faire and great towne, with faire houses of stone, well peopled, the streets are very large", he then added that: "The women be much fairer then those of Pegu" He continued: "Hither to Lamahey come many marchants out of China, and bring great store of muske, golde, silver, and many other things", "They have such plenty that they will not milke the buffaloes, as they doe in all other places."

The first official contact between the Kingdom of England and the Kingdom of Ayutthaya happened in 1612 when an East Indian Company ship called the Globe sailed from Patani (where the Company had a trading station) to the Siamese capital at Ayutthaya. The mission was led by Lucas Antheunis who carried with him a letter from King James I, addressed to King Songtham. Antheunis was accompanied by Thomas Samuel, Thomas Drivers, Thomas Essington, Adam Denton and Peter Floris (who recorded the Globe's voyages). They arrived in Ayutthaya on the 15 August, becoming the first Englishmen to have ever set foot in a Thai capital. To great pomp, Antheunis and his colleagues were given an audience with the King on the 17 September. King Songtham was very pleased, and provided them with several precious objects and a three-storried brick house in Ayutthaya as quarters. In 1615 Antheuniss was replaced by Benjamin Farie, the King then entrusted him with a letter he wrote to King James I.

In 1617 the first English Factory was established, third behind the Portuguese and the Dutch, much to the latter's displeasure. By this time the King was on friendly terms with the English and granted them a further two houses, the English reciprocated by helping Songtham fight against the Cambodians in his wars. The English were mostly interested in trade and concentrated their efforts around the ports of Tennasserim, Mergui and Pattani. There were great rivalry and conflicts between the English and the Dutch to control these areas. Because of the constant conflicts, the low profits yielded and mismanagement, the factory was forced to close in 1623, despite the pleas of the Siamese King for the Company to continue its activities.

=== Return ===
In 1661 the factory was reopened, however very much like the previous period the Company's trade in Ayutthaya was unsatisfactory. A Mr. Potts who was in charge of the factory was described as a: "drunken and dishonest rascal and heavily in debt", Potts eventually set fire to one of the Company's godown in order to cover his embezzlement, when people came to help him put out the fire he promptly chased them away. In 1683 the Company sent two men; Strangh and Thomas Yale to inspect and evaluate the conditions of the factory. They arrived carrying a letter for the Emperor of Japan from King Charles II and nothing for King Narai, they then expected the Siamese to have this letter delivered to Japan for them. After insulting the host and the royal favourite; Constantine Phaulkon (a former cabin boy of a Company ship now first minister of Siam), they were shunned by the King and his court. The two men then closed the factory out of spite and returned to India. After realising their mistake Sir John Child, the President of the Company at Surat, decided to reopen the factory. New Company men arrived in 1685, during the same time as the embassy of the Chevalier de Chaumont from King Louis XIV of France. By this time French power and influence in Ayutthaya was at its zenith.

=== Conflict ===
In 1677 an Englishman named Samuel White entered King Narai's service. White was the younger brother of George White, a friend of Constantine Phaulkon, all having previously worked for the English Company. By 1684 White was appointed by the King to replace his compatriot Richard Barnaby as the Governor of Mergui (also called Shahbandar). In this position White became responsible for the handling of Siamese trade and defence in the Indian Ocean, as well as having authority over the city of Mergui and Tenasserim. Increasingly White began to conduct trade on his own accord, all of these actions were done under the protection of the Siamese flag, albeit without the full knowledge of the Siamese court. Soon White ran into conflict with merchants from the Kingdom of Golkonda (in modern-day Andhra Pradesh, India). In his capacity as Shahbandar, White declared war on Golkonda in 1685, and began seizing merchant ships in the Bay of Bengal for private gain. White and his subordinates (most of whom were English) began to commit indiscriminate acts of piracy, sometimes attacking ships under the Company's jurisdiction. As a result of his actions, Golkonda held the English Company to blame for these losses, due to the fact that the ships were led by Englishmen. When these complaints reached Ayutthaya, the King ordered a full investigation of White's activities, however because of his connection to Phaulkon all the charges were soon cleared.

In 1686 a ship named 'Tiaga Raja', belonging to several Indian merchants residing in Madras, was seized by White and brought back to Mergui. White briefly imprisoned the crew, before allegedly stealing £2,000 worth of belongings from the ship, he then set the ship free. When the crew returned to Madras they made complaints to Elihu Yale the President of Fort St. George. Subsequently, when White seized another ship belonging to an Armenian merchant residing in Madras, Yale declared war on Siam. The Company in London persuaded King James II to issue a royal proclamation, prohibiting any Englishmen to serve on foreign ships. To enforce this ordinance, two warships the Curtana and James was despatched to the Tenasserim coast. The aim of the company was to exact revenge and compensation for the Company's losses. Furthermore, the English also wanted to seize Mergui for itself and assert its military might over Siam before the arrival of the French.

=== 19th–20th Centuries ===
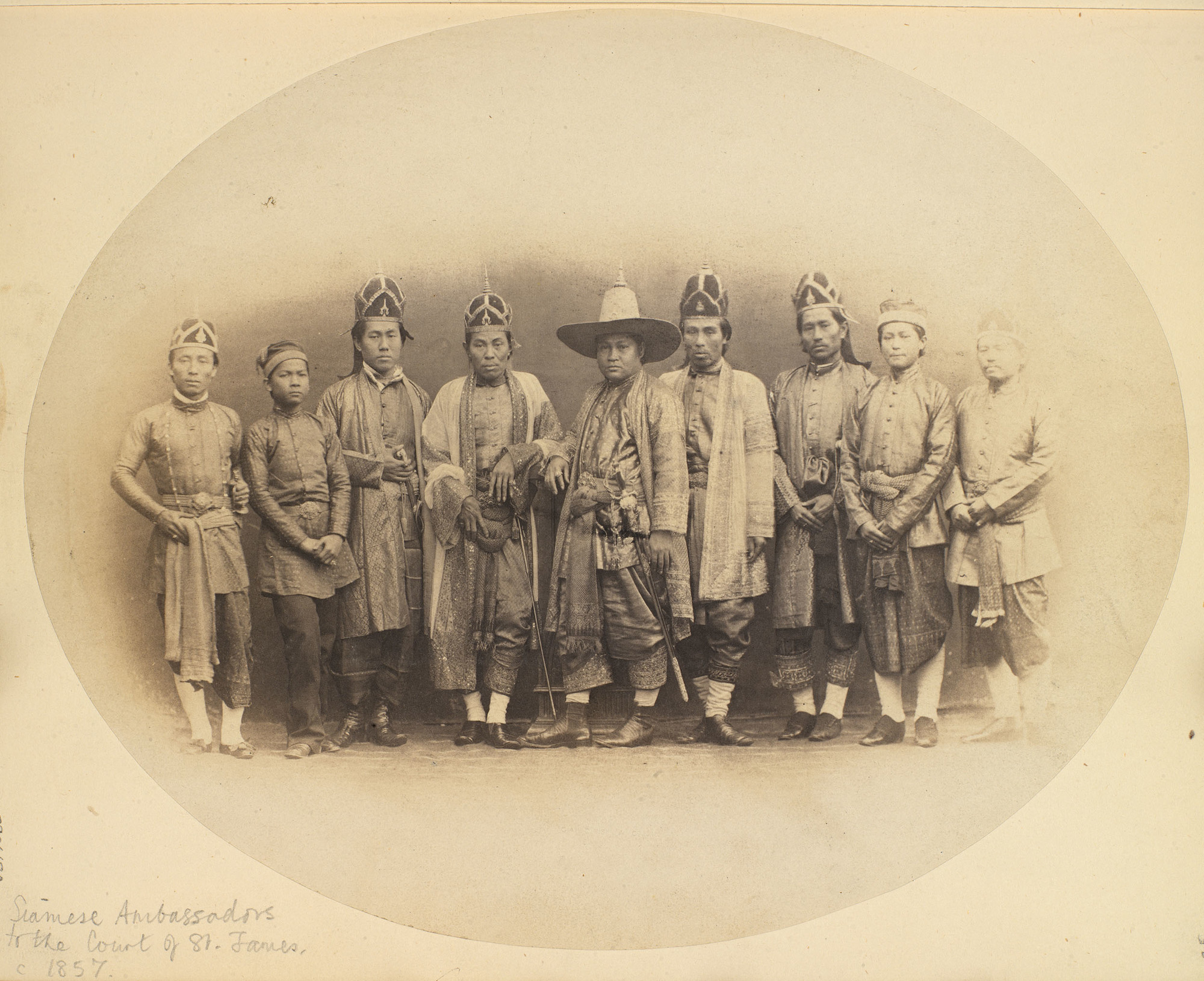
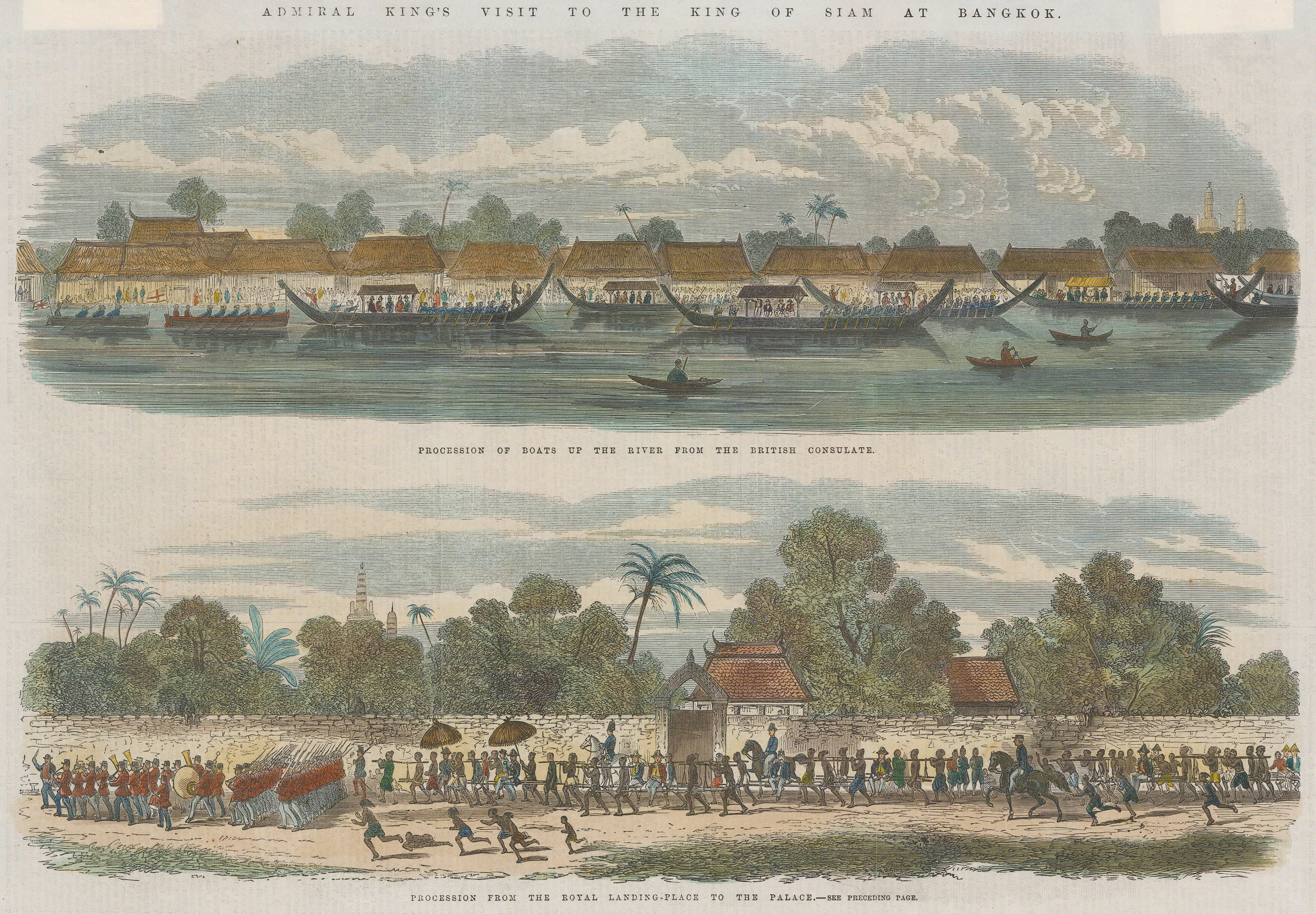
Clockwise: 1. Thai ambassadors to Court of St. James in 1857. 2. British Admiral George King's procession to King Mongkut in Bangkok, 1865

Later, in the 19th century, Britain became, along with France, one of the two major colonial powers exerting pressure on Siam, when it colonised Burma and Malaya to Siam's west and south. During this period, Britain gained significant concessions from Siam through various treaties, including the Burney Treaty in 1826 and the Bowring Treaty in 1855, which remained in effect until after the first World War.

During the second World War in the 1940s, Japanese army men invaded Thailand and Malaya. Thailand resisted landings on its territory for about 5 to 8 hours; it then signed a ceasefire and a Treaty of Friendship with Japan, later declaring war on the UK and the USA. The Japanese then proceeded overland across the Thai–Malayan border to attack Malaya. At this time, the Japanese began bombing Singapore.

Britain directly and indirectly had a massive amount of influence on Siam's modernisation during the late 19th early to early 20th centuries, and the two countries remain important trade partners to the present day.

In the 2020s the smuggling of cannabis into the United Kingdom from Thailand became a significant issue since Thailand decriminalised cannabis in 2022. The British National Crime Agency reported that 26 tonnes of cannabis from Thailand were intercepted in the UK in 2024.

== Economic relations ==
On 21 March 2024, the two countries signed a strategic partnership and launched a Free Trade Agreement Initiative to begin talks on a Thailand–United Kingdom Free Trade Agreement. On 18 September 2024, both countries signed an Enhanced Trade Partnership, committing both sides to explore opportunities for an FTA.

In September 2025, Thailand and the United Kingdom were in discussions to open negotiations for a free trade agreement.

== State and official visits ==
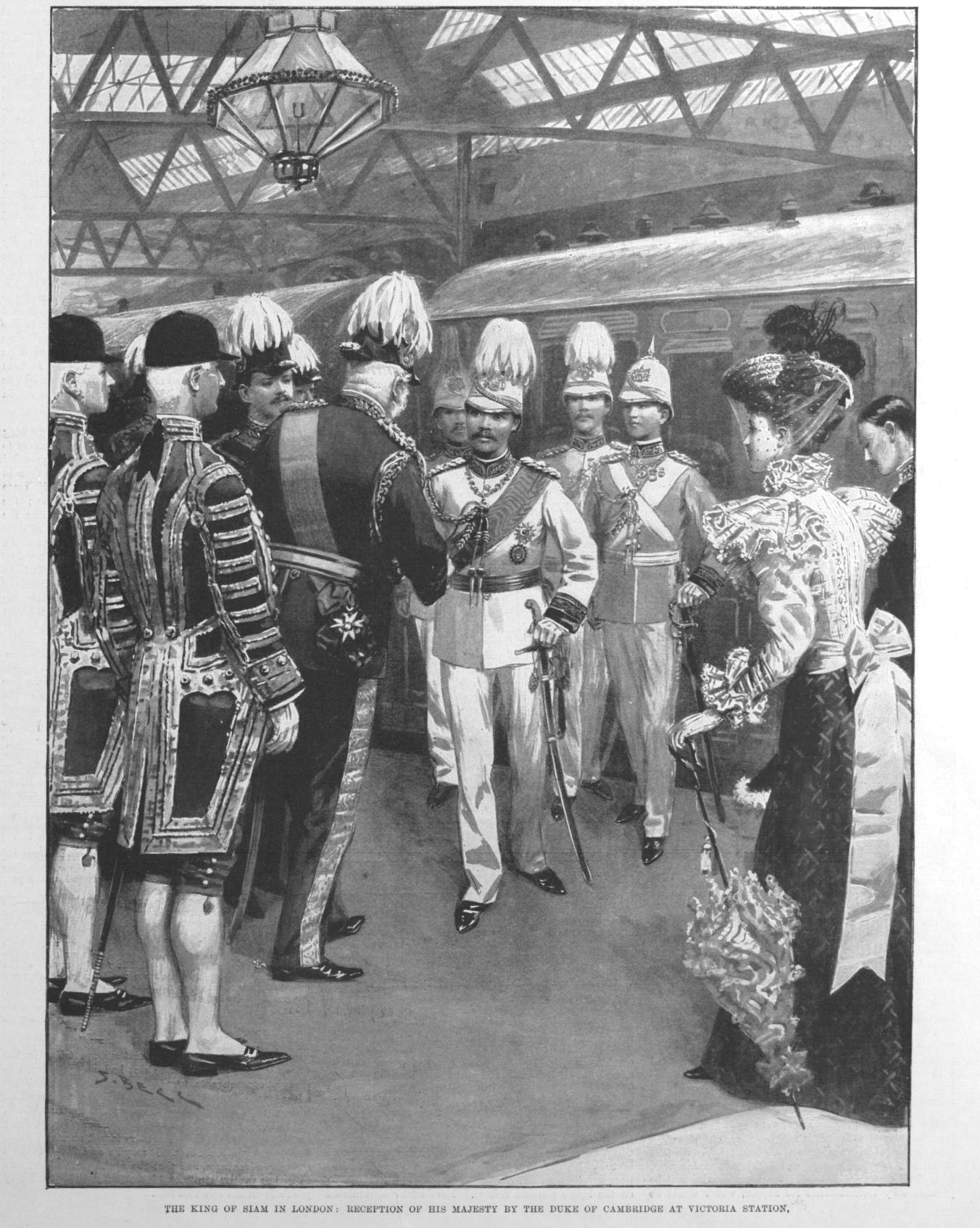
Chulalongkorn being received by Prince George, Duke of Cambridge in London, August 1897

The first official visit by a Thai monarch was made by Chulalongkorn on his tour of Europe, while Queen Elizabeth became the first British monarch to visit Thailand.

State and official visits to Britain by the Siamese/Thai monarch
Dates	People	Locations	Itinerary
30 July - 21 August 1897	King Chulalongkorn	London, and the Isle of Wright	Stayed in Buckingham Palace before travelling to the Isle of Wright to visit Queen Victoria. He left on a train to Dover to board a ship to Germany. Part of his tour of Europe.
17 September - 2 October 1897	King Chulalongkorn	Southampton, London	Arrived in Southampton from Le Havre on SS Stella, and boarded a train for London. Returned to Southampton on 1 October and boarded the royal yacht Maha Chakri with the mayor of Southampton, Edward Gayton. He then went back to London and left Dover for Calais.
19-23 July 1960	King Bhumbol Adulyadej and Queen Sirikit	London	First stop on their 1960 tour of Western Europe, the couple were greeted by Queen Elizabeth II and Prince Philip, Duke of Edinburgh.
4-6 May 2023	King Vajiralongkorn, and Queen Suthida	London	Attended the coronation ceremony of King Charles III and Queen Camilla.

State and official visits to Thailand by the British monarch
Dates	People	Locations	Itinerary
10-15 February 1972	Queen Elizabeth II, Prince Philip, Duke of Edinburgh, and Princess Anne	Bangkok, Ayutthaya, and Chiang Mai province	First official visit to Thailand by a reigning British monarch. Arrived at U-Tapao and entered Bangkok on the HMY Brittannia. They visited Chulalongkorn University and met Prime Minister Thanom Kittikachorn. They then toured Bang Pa-In Palace in Ayutthaya. In Chiang Mai province, they visited Miao hilltribes.
28 October - 1 November 1996	Queen Elizabeth II and Prince Philip	Bangkok, and Ayutthaya	Viewed a royal barge procession celebrating King Bhumbol Adulyadej's Golden Jubilee in Bangkok, before visiting Ayutthaya accompanied by King Bhumibol Adulyadej, Queen Sirikit and members of the Thai royal family. In Ayutthaya, they viewed a Loy Krathong ceremony before visiting Wat Chaiwatthanaram. In

== See also ==
- Foreign relations of Thailand
- Foreign relations of the United Kingdom
- Thais in the United Kingdom

== Bibliography ==
- Floris, Peter (2002) [1934]. Mooreland, W.H. (ed.). Siam, Pattani, Bantam; His Voyage to the East Indies in the Globe, 1611-1615. White Lotus Co., Ltd. ISBN 9747534878.
- Jumsai, M.L. Manich (2000). History of Anglo-Thai Relations (6th ed.). Chalermnit. ASIN B002F72F1S.
- Lach, Donald F.; Van Kley, Edwin J. (1998). Asia in the Making of Europe: A Century of Advance v.3: A Century of Advance Vol 3 (Asia in the Making of Europe Volume III, Book 4). University of Chicago Press. ISBN 0226467686.
