= Manasvi Srisodapol =

Thai diplomat

- มนัสวี ศรีโสดาพล
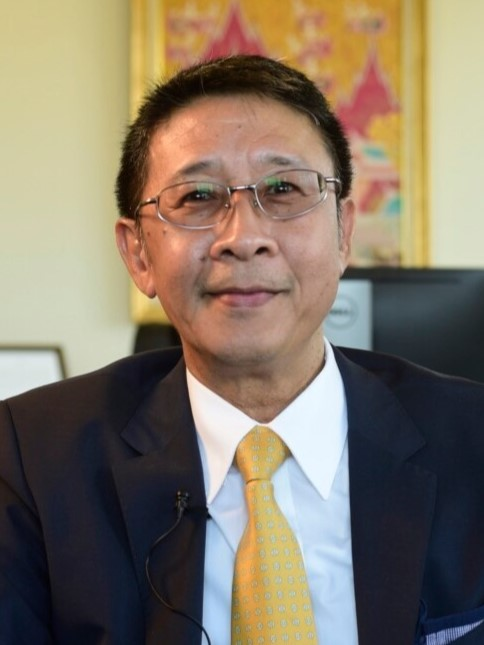

Thai Ambassador to the United States
- In office 2021–2022
- Monarch: Vajiralongkorn
- Prime Minister: Prayut Chan-o-cha
- Preceded by: Thani Thongphakdi
- Succeeded by: Tanee Sangrat

Personal details
- Education: University of Ottawa (BA); Columbia University (MA)

Manasvi Srisodapol (Thai: มนัสวี ศรีโสดาพล) is a Thai diplomat and the former Thai ambassador to the United States from 2021 to 2022. Manasvi previously served as the Thai ambassador to Belgium and Poland.
