= Virachai Plasai =

Thai diplomat (1960 – 2019)

- วีรชัย พลาศรัย
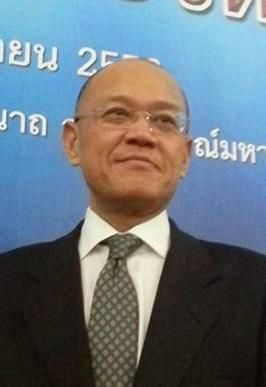

Thai Ambassador to the United States
- In office June 2018 – March 16, 2019
- Monarch: Vajiralongkorn
- Prime Minister: Prayut Chan-o-cha
- Preceded by: Pisan Manawapat
- Succeeded by: Thani Thongphakdi

Thai Ambassador to the United Nations
- In office 2015–2018
- Succeeded by: Vitavas Srivihok

Personal details
- Born: June 9, 1960 Bangkok, Thailand
- Died: March 16, 2019 (aged 58) Johns Hopkins Hospital, Baltimore, Maryland, US
- Education: University of Paris (LL.B, LL.M., PhD)

Virachai Plasai (Thai: วีรชัย พลาศรัย) was a Thai diplomat who served as Thai Ambassador to the United States from 2018 to 2019. Virachai previously served as Thai Ambassador to the United Nations from 2015 to 2018 and Thai Ambassador to the Netherlands from 2009 to 2015. Virachai died on March 16, 2019, while being treated for myelodysplastic syndrome.
