= List of ambassadors of Thailand to France =

Coordinates: 48.861°N 2.3103°E

Ambassador of Thailand to France Ambassade de Thaïlande en France
- Incumbent; Nikorndej Balankura since March 25, 2026
- Inaugural holder: Bénigne Vachet
- Formation: January 5, 1684

The Thai Ambassador in Paris is the official representative of the Government in Bangkok to the Government of France and Permanent Representative to the UNESCO.

== List of representatives ==
diplomatic agreement/designated/Diplomatic accreditation	Buddhist calendar	ambassador	Thai language	Remark	Monarch or Prime Minister	Monarch or President	Term end
January 5, 1684		Bénigne Vachet		left Siam for France on January 5, 1684	Narai	Louis XIV	
June 1686	2229	Kosa Pan	th:เจ้าพระยาโกษาธิบดี (ปาน)	Siamese embassy to France (1686)	Narai	Louis XIV	March 1687
1887	2434	Phraya Kraikaka (Thailand)	พระยาไกรโกษา	In the early Rattanakosin period, Phraya Kraikakarn was the senior chancellor of the palace, usually serving as the royal quarters, the author of the royal palace, and was responsible for the royal treasury.	Chulalongkorn	Marie François Sadi Carnot	1891
1891	2439	Wattana Nuwong	:th:พระเจ้าน้องยาเธอ พระองค์เจ้าวัฒนานุวงศ์	Younger brother of King Chulalongkorn	Chulalongkorn	Marie François Sadi Carnot	1896
1893				Franco-Siamese crisis	Chulalongkorn	Marie François Sadi Carnot	
1897	2449	Phraya Suriyanuvat (Koet Bunnag)	th:พระยาสุริยานุวัตร (เกิด บุนนาค)	Member of the influential Bunnag family	Chulalongkorn	Félix Faure	1906
1906	2452	Prince Charoonsak Kridakorn	th:พระวรวงศ์เธอ พระองค์เจ้าจรูญศักดิ์กฤดากร	Grandson of King Mongkut (Rama IV)	Chulalongkorn	Armand Fallières	1909
1909	2455	Boworadet	th:พระวรวงศ์เธอ พระองค์เจ้าบวรเดช		Chulalongkorn	Armand Fallières	1912
1912	2471	Prince Charoonsak Kridakorn (1877–1947)	th:พระวรวงศ์เธอ พระองค์เจ้าจรูญศักดิ์กฤดากร		Vajiravudh	Armand Fallières	1928
1928	2474	Phraya Wichit Wongwutthikrai (MR Sith Suthat)	พระยาวิชิตวงศ์วุฒิไกร	Lieutenant General	Prajadhipok	Gaston Doumergue	1931
1931	2477	Amarat Kridakorn	th:หม่อมเจ้าอมรทัต กฤดากร	(April 29, 1886 – July 30, 1952)	Prajadhipok	Paul Doumer	1934
1934	2478	Phra Rajawangse	th:พระยาราชวังสัน (ศรี กมลนาวิน)	From 1935 to 1939 he was Thai Ambassador to the United Kingdom.	Phraya Phahonphonphayuhasena	Albert Lebrun	1935
1935	2480	Phra Riem Virajaphak (Riem Thantranon)	นาวาเอก พระเรียมวิรัชชพากษ์ (เรี่ยม ทรรทรานนท์)	Siam Berne Paris Masa-aki Hotta (1937) Eiji Amau (1938) Phra Riem Virajaphak (Riem Thantranon) Phra Bahiddha Nukara (des novembre 1937) Bäle, Geneve, Professor Nopparat Vimatcharak (Rutiam Thantranon), Ambassador of Thailand to Paris The author of the first Thai-French dictionary	Phraya Phahonphonphayuhasena	Albert Lebrun	1937
November 1, 1937		Phra Bahiddha Nukara	พระพหิทธานุกร (ส่วน นวราช)		Phraya Phahonphonphayuhasena	Albert Lebrun	June 14, 1940
1947	2491	Nakkhatra Mangala	หม่อมเจ้า นักขัตรมงคล กิติยากร		Khuang Aphaiwong	Vincent Auriol	1948
1948		Visutr Arthayukti	วิสูตร อรรถยุกติ (หลวงวิสูตรวิรัชชเทศ)	In 1949 the rank of the mission was promoted to an Embassy. Mr. Visut Atthapiikit was promoted to Ambassador	Plaek Phibunsongkhram	Vincent Auriol	
1954	2503	Chai Pradipasena	ไชย ประทีปะเสน	From 18 February 1943 to 5 August 1944 he was secretary general of ministers. In Hanoi Governor-General Decoux rejected Thai demands presented by Major Chai Pradipasena on October 6, while offering an investigation of border incidents.	Plaek Phibunsongkhram	René Coty	1960
1960	2506	Amnuay Chaya-Rochana	อำนวย ไชยโรจน์		Sarit Thanarat	Charles de Gaulle	1963
1963	2507	Cheed Sreshthaputra	จี๊ด เศรษฐบุตร		Thanom Kittikachorn	Charles de Gaulle	1964
1964	2512	Bun Charoenchai	บุณย์ เจริญไชย	From 18 February 1943 to 5 August 1944 he was Minister of Industry of Siam.	Thanom Kittikachorn	Charles de Gaulle	1969
1970	2514	Phairot Jayanama	ไพโรจน์ ชัยนาม		Thanom Kittikachorn	Georges Pompidou	1971
1972	2516	Obeboon Vanikkul	โอบบุญ วณิกกุล	1966 – 1972 he was Thai Ambassador to Japan	Thanom Kittikachorn	Georges Pompidou	1973
1973	2518	Vicha Dhitavat	วิชา ฐิตวัฒน์	Colonel	Sanya Dharmasakti	Georges Pompidou	1975
1975	2520	Wichian Watanakun	th:วิเชียร วัฒนคุณ	(9 August 1930 – 22 March 2014)	Seni Pramoj	Valéry Giscard d’Estaing	1977
1977	2521	Sompong Sucharitkul	สมปอง สุจริตกุล		Kriangsak Chomanan	Valéry Giscard d’Estaing	1978
1978	2522	Vikrom Ninnand	วิกรม นินนาท	In 1963 he was Thai Ambassador to Spain; From 1971 to 1974 he was Thai Ambassador to Laos	Kriangsak Chomanan	Valéry Giscard d’Estaing	1979
1980	2526	Owart Suthiwart-Narueput	โอวาท สุทธิวาทนฤพุฒิ	From 1972 to 1975 he was Thai Ambassador to Sri Lanka.	Prem Tinsulanonda	Valéry Giscard d’Estaing	1983
1983	2528	Arun Panupong	th:อรุณ ภาณุพงศ์	(15 March 1921 in Phatthalung Province).	Prem Tinsulanonda	François Mitterrand	1985
1985	2530	Pracha Guna-Kasem	th:ประชา คุณะเกษม		Prem Tinsulanonda	François Mitterrand	1987
1987	2533	Wichian Watanakun	th:วิเชียร วัฒนคุณ		Prem Tinsulanonda	François Mitterrand	1990
1990	2538	Thepkamol Devakula	th:หม่อมราชวงศ์เทพ เทวกุล		Chatichai Choonhavan	François Mitterrand	1995
1995	2543	Tej Bunnag	th:เตช บุนนาค		Banharn Silpa-Archa	Jacques Chirac	2000
2000	2545	Saroj Chavanaviraj	th:สาโรจน์ ชวนะวิรัช	In 2008 he became foreign minister	Chuan Leekpai	Jacques Chirac	2002
April 1, 2003	2547	Krit Garnjana-Goonchorn	th:กฤษณ์ กาญจนกุญชร	From July 25, 2007 to Thai Ambassador to the United States	Thaksin Shinawatra	Jacques Chirac	2004
April 20, 2004	2549	Virasakdi Futrakul	th:วีระศักดิ์ ฟูตระกูล		Thaksin Shinawatra	Jacques Chirac	2006
February 10, 2006	2552	Thana Duangratana	ธนะ ดวงรัตน์	Thana Duangratana	Surayud Chulanont	Jacques Chirac	2009
October 2, 2009		Viraphand Vacharathit	วีรพันธุ์ วัชราทิตย์		Samak Sundaravej	Nicolas Sarkozy	
October 26, 2012		Somsak Suriyawongse	สมศักดิ์ สุริยวงศ์	Somsak Yi Wong List of Thammasat University people	Yingluck Shinawatra	François Hollande	
February 20, 2014		Apichart Chinwanno	อภิชาติ ชินวณิชย์		Yingluck Shinawatra	François Hollande	February 15, 2016
February 15, 2016		Sihasak Phuangketkeow	สีหศักดิ์ พวงเกตุแก้ว	Later Permanent Secretary of Foreign Affairs.	Prayut Chan-o-cha	François Hollande	April 12, 2019
April 12, 2019		Sarun Charoensuwan	ศรัณย์ เจริญสุวรรณ	Served a second term in 2024–2026.	Prayut Chan-o-cha	Emmanuel Macron	July 22, 2022
July 22, 2022		Tana Weskosith	ธนา เวสโกสิทธิ์		Prayut Chan-o-cha	Emmanuel Macron	September 17, 2024
September 17, 2024		Sarun Charoensuwan	ศรัณย์ เจริญสุวรรณ	Second term.	Paetongtarn Shinawatra	Emmanuel Macron	March 25, 2026
March 25, 2026		Nikorndej Balankura	นิกรเดช พลางกูร	Also Permanent Delegate to UNESCO.	Anutin Charnvirakul	Emmanuel Macron	

- France–Thailand relations
