= List of ambassadors of Thailand to Myanmar =

Coordinates: 16.791333°N 96.140306°E

Ambassador of Thailand to Myanmar
- Incumbent; Mongkol Visitstump since December 8, 2022
- Inaugural holder: Pakthip Malakul
- Formation: December 14, 1949

The Thai Ambassador in Yangon is the official representative of the Government in Bangkok to the Government of Myanmar.

== List of representatives ==
Diplomatic agreement/designated/Diplomatic accreditation	Ambassador	Thai language	Observations	List of prime ministers of Thailand	List of presidents of Myanmar	Term end
December 14, 1949			Pote Sarasin, Thai Foreign Minister, opened the Thai Embassy in Yangon.	Phibul Songkhram	Sao Shwe Thaik	
December 14, 1949	Pakthip Malakul		Religious rites were held at the opening with both Burmese and Thai monks officiating. ML Pakthip Malakul was named Chargé d'affaires pending the arrival in Rangoon of ambassador-designate Bahiddha	Phibul Songkhram	Sao Shwe Thaik	
December 30, 1949	Bahiddha Nukara	พระ พ หิ ท ธา นุ กร ( ส่วน นว ราช )	The first Thai Ambassador to Burma arrived in Rangoon, 1950 H.E. Phra Bahidda Nukara, first Thai Ambassador to Burma, presented his credentials to the President. Siamese Chargé d'Affaires, London, 14 May 1930 Phra Bahiddha Nukara. On 19 Oct. 1950 he was accredited as Thai Ambassador to the United Kingdom.	Phibul Songkhram	Sao Shwe Thaik	
June 8, 1953	Prince Pisit Dispongs Diskul		(*Aug 9, 1905 1966) he was a son of Damrong Rajanubhab (20th family descended from King Mongkut).: Educated Mil. Academy of Thailand; Mil. Staff College; Maj.- Gen., Royal Thai Army; Inspector-*In 1947 he was designated General of Infantry.; In 1951 he was Deputy Commander of General Staff.; 1952 he was director of the Intelligence Department.	Phibul Songkhram	Ba U	
1961	Charas Chaloemtiarana		(*January 24, 1909 in Bangkok). He received his education in Bangkok, graduating from the Assumption ... He was educated in Bangkok where he was graduated from the Assumption College and the University of Thammasat.He was educated in Bangkok where he was graduated from the Assumption College and the University of Thammasat. He was educated in Bangkok where he was graduated from the Assumption College and the University of Thammasat. He entered the Foreign Service in 1928 and after serving, as secretary, in Italy, Switzerland and Japan, he was appointed Director- General of the Department of Protocol. His appointment to Saigon is his first ambassadorial assignment. he is married	Sarit Thanarat	Ba U	
1968	Suwit Boworwathana			Thanom Kittikachorn	Ne Win	
1970	Banthern Amatayakul	Chargé d'affaires		Thanom Kittikachorn	Ne Win	
1972	Wongse Polnikorn		Thai Ambassador to Burma Mr. Wongse Polnikorn Deputy Agriculture Minister Wongse Polnikorn, Vong Polnikorn took leave of his majesty today prior to his departure to take up the posts as Thai Ambassador to Argentina.	Thanom Kittikachorn	Ne Win	
1978	Sakchai Bamrungpong	th:ศักดิชัย บำรุงพงศ์	1918	Kriangsak Chomanan	Ne Win	1978
February 20, 1980	Thepkamol Devakula		Thep Thewakun	Prem Tinsulanonda	Ne Win	
1984	Somphand Kokilanon			Prem Tinsulanonda	San Yu	
1992	Wirasak Futrakun		Virasakdi Futrakul	Suchinda Kraprayoon	Than Shwe	1994
1994	Poksak Nilubol		Poksak Nin-ubon	Chuan Leekpai	Than Shwe	1998
1999	Pensak Chalarak		Pensak Chalarak, Phansak Chalarak	Chuan Leekpai	Than Shwe	
2001	Sura Pon Pose Yamoot			Thaksin Shinawatra	Than Shwe	
January 14, 2004	Suphot Dhirakaosal	สุพจน์ ธีรเกาศัลย์		Thaksin Shinawatra	Than Shwe	
2007	Bansarn Bunnag	บรรสาน บุนนาค	(*17 April 1959) obtained her B.A. degree from the Northeast.: In 2012 he became Thai Ambassador to Poland.; On 26 Feb 2015 he became Thai Ambassador to Singapore.; On 31 March 2016 he became Thai Ambassador to Japan.	Surayud Chulanont	Than Shwe	
May 16, 2012	Pisanu Suvanajata	พิษณุ สุวรรณะชฎ		Yingluck Shinawatra	Thein Sein	December 7, 2016
March 30, 2017	Jukr Boon-Long	จักร บุญ-หลง	26.09.2016 agreement (* 17 November 1957 in Thailand) is married, obtained a bachelor's degree of Law from the University of Ramkhamhaeng of Thailand, a master's degree in International Politics and Economics from the University of Detroit, United States of America, and an honourable degree from the National Defense College of Thailand in 2009. *In 1984 he joined the Ministry of Foreign Affairs of Thailand, has served in the Royal Thai Embassies in Washington DC, Hanoi and Berlin.: From 2006 to 2009, he served as Consul-General of Thailand in Los Angeles.; From 2009 to 2012 he was director General of the Department of Consular Affairs of the Ministry of Foreign Affairs of the Kingdom of Thailand.; From 11 Jul 2012 to 2015 he was Thai Ambassador Israel and concurrently as Thai Ambassador to Norway.	Prayut Chan-o-cha	Htin Kyaw	2018
April 10, 2019	Suphatra Srimaitreephithak	สุพัตรา ศรีไมตรีพิทักษ์	Presented credentials to President Win Myint on 10 April 2019. Farewell call on SAC Chairman Min Aung Hlaing 9 March 2022.	Prayut Chan-o-cha	Win Myint	2022
December 8, 2022	Mongkol Visitstump	มงคล วิศิษฏ์สตัมภ์	Presented credentials to SAC Chairman Min Aung Hlaing on 8 December 2022.	Prayut Chan-o-cha	Min Aung Hlaing	
