= Laxanachantorn Laohaphan =

Thai diplomat (born 1946)

Khun Ying Laxanachantorn Laohaphan
- ลักษณาจันทร เลาหพันธุ์

Thai Ambassador to the United Nations
- In office 2004–2007
- Monarch: Bhumibol Adulyadej
- Prime Minister: Thaksin Shinawatra; Surayud Chulanont

Thai Ambassador to the United Nations at Geneva
- In office February 1, 2003 – December 1, 2003
- Monarch: Bhumibol Adulyadej
- Prime Minister: Thaksin Shinawatra

Personal details
- Born: 27 September 1946 (age 80)
- Education: Chulalongkorn University (BA); Western Michigan University (MA)

Khun Ying Laxanachantorn Laohaphan (Thai: ลักษณาจันทร เลาหพันธุ์) is a Thai diplomat, serving as the Thai Ambassador to the United Nations from 2004 to 2007. Laxanachantorn presented her credentials to UN Secretary-General Kofi Annan on January 16, 2004. She previously served as Thai Ambassador to the United Nations at Geneva in 2003, and Thai Ambassador to Australia from 1995 to 2000.
