= List of ambassadors of Thailand to Italy =

Coordinates: 41.921232°N 12.518278°E

Ambassador of Thailand to Italy
- Incumbent; Puttaporn Ewtoksan since April 23, 2024
- Inaugural holder: Sanpakitch Preencha
- Formation: October 1, 1923

The Thai Ambassador in Rome is the official representative of the Government in Bangkok to the Government of Italy and concurrently to the governments in Athens (Greece), Jerusalem (Israel), Nicosia (Cyprus), San Marino, Tirana (Albania) and the Order of Malta.

== List of representatives ==
Diplomatic agreement/designated/Diplomatic accreditation	Ambassador	Thai language	Observations	List of prime ministers of Thailand	List of prime ministers of Italy	Term end	
October 1, 1923	Sanpakitch Preencha	พระยาสรรพกิจปรีชา	Concurrently Minister Plenipotentiary to Lisbon, where he after the 28 May 1926 coup d'état negotiated a treaty.	Vajiravudh	Benito Mussolini	November 6, 1926	
November 6, 1926	Phya Chammong Dithakar		(*1874 1930): 1911 he was Thai Ambassador to Japan.; He was the son of a former Minister of Foreign Affairs, and was educated in Siam and in England, entering diplomatic service in 1897. He became secretary of legation at Tokyo in 1901, when he also acted as chargé d'affaires. He was transferred to London in 1903 and acted as chargé d'affaires at Paris in 1904, returning to London in 1905. In 1907 he was transferred to Petrograd where he remained until being appointed to the consular bureau of the Foreign Office in 1909, after which he was appointed Siamese Minister to Japan. The Siamese Minister holds several distinguished decorations, including the Fourth Class Order of the White Elephant and the First Class Order of the Rising Sun.	Vajiravudh	Benito Mussolini	1930	
1937	Luang Siri Rajmaitri			Phraya Phahon Phonphayuhasena	Benito Mussolini		
December 7, 1939	Luang Visutra Virajjades		Dicembre 7 – L'incaricato d'affari del Siam a Roma, signor Luang Visutra Virajjades, è stato ricevuto da S. E il conte Ciano, e lo ha informato che il ministro del Siam a Roma sarà accreditato presso S. M il Re d'Italia e Imperatore d'Etiopia.	Phibul Songkhram	Benito Mussolini		
1945	Luang Bahiddha Nukara				Tawee Boonyaket	Ferruccio Parri	1945
March 29, 1957	Phairot Jayanama		(*April 13, 1911 in Bangkok) Ph.D., Prof. Senior Lecturer, Faculty of Law and Faculty of Political Science, Thammasat University. Education: Completed P.1, Wat	Pote Sarasin	Adone Zoli	1960	
July 5, 1961	Principe Wongsanuvatra Devakula	th:หม่อมเจ้าวงศานุวัตร เทวกุล	accredited 6 May 1953 as Thai Ambassador to the United Kingdom	Sarit Dhanarajata	Fernando Tambroni		
March 25, 1964	Somboon Palasthira			Thanom Kittikachorn	Giovanni Leone		
July 17, 1968	Prince Vongsamahip Jayankura			Thanom Kittikachorn	Giovanni Leone	1972	
March 17, 1970	Thuaithep Devakul			Thanom Kittikachorn	Emilio Colombo		
May 30, 1975	Nibhon Wilairat			Seni Pramoj	Aldo Moro		
December 14, 1976	Swate Komalabhuti	เศวต โกมลภูติ	On August 13, 1975, he became Thai Ambassador to Laos.; 1976 he was Thai Ambassador to the Philippines.	Seni Pramoj	Giulio Andreotti	1978	
July 19, 1994	Anurak Thananan			Suchinda Kraprayoon	Silvio Berlusconi		
March 19, 2002	Vikrom Koompirochana		In 1994 he was Thai Ambassador to Singapore.; In 1996 he was Thailand's ambassador to Malaysia.	Thaksin Shinawatra	Silvio Berlusconi		
February 6, 2003	Vara-Poj-Snidvongs		Vara-Poj Snidvonons, Vara-Poj Snidvongs na Ayudhya	Thaksin Shinawatra	Silvio Berlusconi	2006	
March 11, 2008	Pradap Pibulsonggram		From 1996 to 2000 he was Thai Ambassador to Hungary and Croatia.; From 2004 to 2006 he was Thai Ambassador to Switzerland.	Samak Sundaravej	Silvio Berlusconi	2009	
July 5, 2010	Somsakdi Suriyawongse		From 2004 to 2006 he was Thai Ambassador to the United Arab Emirates.; On May 24, 2012, he became Thai Ambassador to Austria.	Samak Sundaravej	Silvio Berlusconi		
April 4, 2016	Tana Weskosith			Prayut Chan-o-cha	Matteo Renzi	2019	
May 9, 2019	Chirdchu Raktabutr	เชิดชู รักตะบุตร	Formerly Director-General of the Department of Treaties and Legal Affairs; presented credentials to President Sergio Mattarella	Prayut Chan-o-cha	Giuseppe Conte	2022	
December 2, 2022	Rommanee Kananurak	รมณี คณานุรักษ์	Appointed by royal command of 2 December 2022	Prayut Chan-o-cha	Giorgia Meloni	2024	
April 23, 2024	Puttaporn Ewtoksan	พุทธพร อิ้วตกส้าน	Presented credentials to President Sergio Mattarella	Srettha Thavisin	Giorgia Meloni		

- Italy–Thailand relations
