= List of ambassadors of Thailand to Canada =

Coordinates: 45.401578°N 75.750233°W

Ambassador of Thailand to Canada
- Inaugural holder: Phya Abhibal Rajamaitri
- Formation: July 8, 1948

The Thai Ambassador in Ottawa is the official representative of the Government in Bangkok to the Government of Canada.

== List of representatives ==
diplomatic agreement/designated/Diplomatic accreditation	Buddhist calendar	Ambassador	Thai language	Observations	Prime Ministers of Thailand	Prime Ministers of Canada	Term end	Buddhist calendar
March 20, 1962	2505	Somchai Anuman-Rajadhon	สมจัย อนุมานราชธน		Sarit Dhanarajata	John Diefenbaker	1965	2508
January 1, 1965	2508	Kasem S. Kasemsri	th:หม่อมราชวงศ์เกษมสโมสร เกษมศรี	Chargé d'affaires (* March 9, 1930): Master's degree from Mahidol University.; From May 28, 1995 to May 27, 1996 he headed the Ministry of Foreign Affairs (Thailand)	Thanom Kittikachorn	Lester Pearson	May 9, 1967	2511
May 9, 1967	2510	Anand Panyarachun	th:อานันท์ ปันยารชุน		Thanom Kittikachorn	Lester Pearson	1972	2515
November 23, 1972	2515	Banbhot Bhanich Supapol	พันเอกบรรพต พานิชศุภผล	General: From 1966 to 1969 he was Thai Ambassador in Laos.	Thanom Kittikachorn	Pierre Trudeau	1975	2518
November 10, 1975	2518	Sakol Wannapruk	สากล วรรณพฤกษ์	From 1979 to 1980 he was Thai Ambassador to China.	Seni Pramoj	Pierre Trudeau	1979	2522
June 28, 1979	2522	Jinda Attanandana	จินดา อัตตะนันท์		Kriangsak Chomanan	Joe Clark	1981	2524
January 21, 1982	2525	Vitthaya Vejjajiva	วิทยา เวชชาชีวะ		Prem Tinsulanonda	Pierre Trudeau	1984	2527
January 21, 1984	2527	Manaspas Xuto	มนัสพาสน์ ชูโต		Prem Tinsulanonda	John Turner	1988	2531
January 24, 1989	2532	Chawat Arthayukti	ชวัช อรรถยุกติ		Chatichai Choonhavan	Brian Mulroney	1994	2537
December 13, 1994	2537	Virasakdi Futrakul	th:วีระศักดิ์ ฟูตระกูล		Suchinda Kraprayoon	Jean Chrétien	1997	2540
January 29, 1997	2540	Sunai Bunyasiriphant	สุนัย บุณยศิริพันธุ์		Chuan Leekpai	Jean Chrétien	2002	2545
February 12, 2003	2546	Suvidhya Simaskul	สุวิทย์ สิมะสกุล		Thaksin Shinawatra	Paul Martin	2004	2547
September 2, 2004	2547	Snanchart Devahastin Na Ayudhya	สนั่นชาติ เทพหัสดิน ณ อยุธยา		Thaksin Shinawatra	Paul Martin	2009	2552
September 16, 2009	2552	Adisak Panupong	อดิศักดิ์ ภาณุพงศ์		Samak Sundaravej	Stephen Harper	2010	2553
February 8, 2011	2554	Udomphol Ninnad	อดิศักดิ์ ภาณุพงศ์		Yingluck Shinawatra	Stephen Harper	2013	2556
November 25, 2013	2556	Pisan Manawapat	พิศาล มาณวพัฒน์		Prayut Chan-o-cha	Justin Trudeau	2015	2558
February 13, 2015	2558	Vijavat Isarabhakdi	วิชาวัฒน์ อิศรภักดี				March 11, 2023	2558

- Canada–Thailand relations
