= List of ambassadors of Thailand to the United Kingdom =

Ambassador of Thailand to the United Kingdom Embassy of Thailand, London
- เอกอัครราชทูตไทยประจำสหราชอาณาจักร
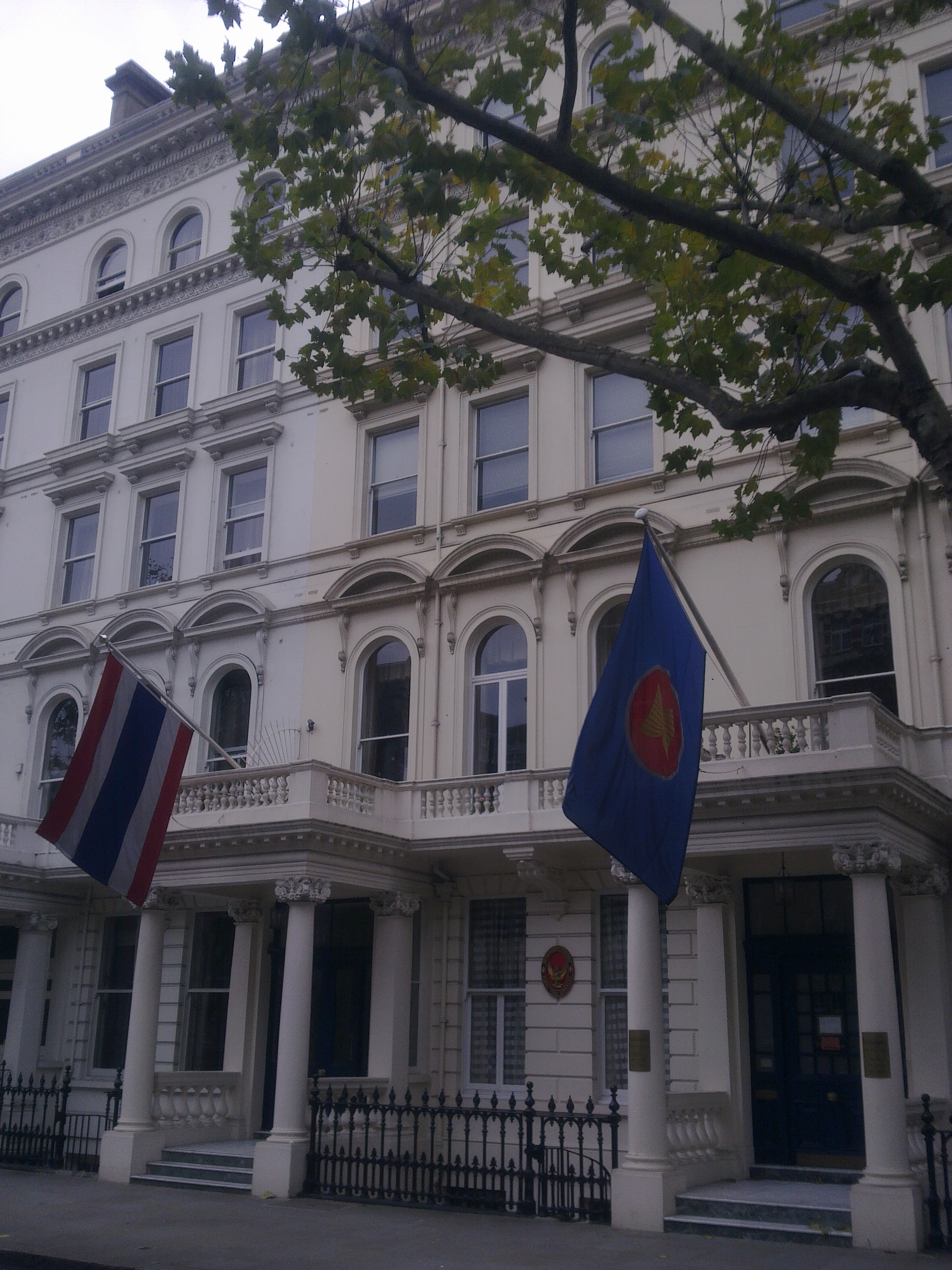
- Incumbent; Nadhavathna Krishnamra since January 6, 2025
- Inaugural holder: Phraya Mahayotha
- Formation: May 14, 1892

The Thai Ambassador to the Court of St James's in London is the official representative of the Government in Bangkok to the Government of the United Kingdom and concurrently to the Government of Denmark and the Government of Ireland. The position is held by Nadhavathna Krishnamra, who presented his credentials to King Charles III on May 21, 2025.

== List of representatives ==
| Agrément/designated/Diplomatic accreditation | Ambassador | Thai language | Observations | Monarch (Pre-1932)/ Prime minister of Thailand (Post-1932) | Prime ministers of the United Kingdom | Term end |
|---|---|---|---|---|---|---|
| November 19, 1857 | Phraya Montri Suriyawong (Humphun Bunnag) | th:พระยามนตรีสุริยวงศ์ (ชุ่ม บุนนาค) | (1820–1866) Montri Suriyawong | Mongkut | Lord Palmerston | |
| 1882 | Narisara Nuwattiwong | th:สมเด็จพระเจ้าบรมวงศ์เธอ เจ้าฟ้าจิตรเจริญ กรมพระยานริศรานุวัดติวงศ์ | First Siamese resident minister to London established the Embassy of Thailand, London. | Chulalongkorn | William Ewart Gladstone | |
| 1887 | Prince Naret Worarit Krom Phra Naret Worarit Kridakorn | พระเจ้าน้องยาเธอกรมหมื่นนเรศวรฤทธิ์ พระเจ้าบรมวงค์เธอกรมพระนเรศวรฤทธิ์ | (1855-1925) Prince Naret Worarit then Prince Naret as Siamese Minister in London, was advised by Prince Naret was then appointed the minister of the capital, and Prince Svasti served briefly as Siam's first minister of justice when that position was established in 1892. For several years Prince Sonabandit served as the king's royal secretary, H.S.H. Prince CHITCHANOK Kridakorn (B.E. 2447), son of H.R H. Krom Phra Naret Worarit Kridakorn (Second Family descended from King Mongkut). Royal Thai Embassy, London. H.R.H. Prince CHITRAKARN Chakraphan (B.E. 2460), son | Chulalongkorn | Robert Gascoyne-Cecil, 3rd Marquess of Salisbury | |
| May 14, 1892 | Phraya Mahayotha | พระยามหาโยธา (นกแก้ว คชเสนี) | The Phraya Mahayotha (rendered in some source with the western noble title of Marquess), Who was among the saloon passengers of the Cunarder Lucinda, which arrived at her pier yesterday morning, holds the dual office of Siamese Minister to Great Britain arrived Siamese Minister to the United States. | Chulalongkorn | Robert Gascoyne-Cecil, 3rd Marquess of Salisbury | 1895 |
| January 1, 1896 | Phraya Wisutsuriyasak | พระยาวิสุทธ์สุริยาศักดิ์ | Phraya Wisut Suriyasak (Pia Malakul, 1867-1916 2456–2468): He was a grandson of Chaoja Prince Mahamala; He had been sent to England as the Siamese Minister in London and Siamese language tutor to Prince Wachirawut, sent a report back. Phraya Wisut Suriyasak, deputy minister of education. | Chulalongkorn | Robert Gascoyne-Cecil, 3rd Marquess of Salisbury | September 20, 1895 |
| November 1, 1893 | Phra Suriya Nuvatr | | Concurrently Thai Ambassador to the United States Phra Suriya Nuvatr | Chulalongkorn | William Ewart Gladstone | |
| December 28, 1897 | Phya Visuddha Suriyasakti | | On November 12, 1898 he became Thai Ambassador to the United States. | Chulalongkorn | Robert Gascoyne-Cecil, 3rd Marquess of Salisbury | November 18, 1899 |
| October 1, 1899 | Phya Prasiddhi Salakar | | Concurrently accredited as Thai Ambassador to the United States. | Chulalongkorn | Robert Gascoyne-Cecil, 3rd Marquess of Salisbury | November 18, 1899 |
| December 18, 1902 | Phya Visutr Kosa | | Phya Visutr Kosa, Envoy Extraordinary and Minister Plenipotentiary from Siam was received in audience by King Edward VII and presented credentials on 18 December 1902. | Chulalongkorn | Henry Campbell-Bannerman | January 1, 1910 |
| January 1, 1912 | Phya Akharaj Waradhara | | | Vajiravudh | H. H. Asquith | |
| July 19, 1912 | Phya Sudham Maitri | | Envoyé extraordinaire et Ministre plénipotentiaire à Londres, à Bruxelles et à La Haye. | Vajiravudh | H. H. Asquith | |
| January 1, 1920 | Phya Buree Nawaraj | | | Vajiravudh | David Lloyd George | |
| January 1, 1927 | Prince Varnvaidyakara Voravarn | | grandson of King Mongkut. concurrently accredited to Belgium and the Netherlands. | Prajadhipok | Stanley Baldwin | |
| January 5, 1932 | Phya Subarn Sompati | | *With residence in London, concurrently accredited to Germany, Denmark, Sweden and Norway. | Phraya Manopakorn Nititada | Ramsay MacDonald | March 9, 1935 |
| January 1, 1936 | Phya Rajawangsan | th:พระยาราชวังสัน (ศรี กมลนาวิน) | 2478-2482 Siamese Minister to London, where he died in office and Permanent Representative to the League of Nations Lijst van Thaise ministers van Defensie Phya Rajawangsan, was minister in London. | Phraya Phahon Phonphayuhasena | Stanley Baldwin | February 21, 1939 |
| June 23, 1940 | Phra Manuvedya Vimolnard | พระมนูเวทย์วิมลนาท (เปี๋ยน สุมาวงศ์) | THAI MINISTER TO LONDON HERE DHRA Manuvedya Vlmolnard, the newly appointed Thai Minister to London, arrived In Singapore yesterday. On June 12, 1940, Thailand concluded a Non-Aggression Pact with Great Britain and with France at Bangkok. On 25 January 1942, the Siamese government declared war and the Siamese minister in London delivered the declaration of war to the British administration. The first siamese banknote in the reign of Phraya Phahon Phonphayuhasena was printed before the war. Banknotes of the price of 50 Satang Khun Somboon Hattra (Pho Proact) Minister of Finance. The minister in Phraya Phalaponpunda is Prime Minister. Suggest that this type of banknote should be issued. In conjunction with the use of half-cent coins. This banknote was printed to Thomas de la Rue in June 1937, World War II (1941 - 1945), a series of banknotes, was finally approved for publication in August 1941 by the Thai ambassador to London. The Siamese minister to London returned home on Phi bun's orders leaving Siamese citizens in England without effective leadership. Moreover, unlike the Americans, the British accepted Siam's declaration of war and. Siamese citizens were regarded as enemy aliens.: On September 3, 1953 he became Director-General of the Court of Appeal to chair the Supreme Court | Phraya Phahon Phonphayuhasena | Winston Churchill | January 25, 1942 |
| January 1, 1946 | Prince M.C. Jitjanok Krisdakara | พันเอกหม่อมเจ้านักขัตรมงคล กิติยากร | | Kuang Abhayawongse | Clement Attlee | |
| January 1, 1947 | Direk Jayanama | th:ดิเรก ชัยนาม | Direk Jayanama Chaiyanam 1905 | Kuang Abhayawongse | Clement Attlee | February 1, 1948 |
| September 13, 1948 | Nakkhatra Mangala | th:พระวรวงศ์เธอ พระองค์เจ้านักขัตรมงคล กรมหมื่นจันทบุรีสุรนาถ | Prince Nakkhatra Mangala Kitiyakara | Phibul Songkhram | Clement Attlee | |
| October 19, 1950 | Phra Bahiddha Nukara | พระพหิทธานุกร (ส่วน นวราช) | | Phibul Songkhram | Clement Attlee | |
| May 6, 1953 | Prince Wongsanuvatra Devakula | th:หม่อมเจ้าวงศานุวัตร เทวกุล | Mom Wongsunanuvat Devakula (17 September 1904 - 3 April 1991) | Phibul Songkhram | Winston Churchill | June 5, 1958 |
| June 5, 1958 | Wongtip Malakul | th:หม่อมหลวงปีกทิพย์ มาลากุล | (1905 – 1987) | Thanom Kittikachorn | Harold Macmillan | January 1, 1962 |
| March 21, 1963 | Plerng Nobadol Rabibhadana | th:หม่อมเจ้าเพลิงนภดล รพีพัฒน์ | (*1906 1985 ) | Thanom Kittikachorn | Harold Macmillan | |
| February 22, 1968 | Sunthorn Hongladarom | สุนทร หงส์ลดารมภ์ | | Thanom Kittikachorn | Harold Wilson | |
| May 21, 1970 | Kantathi Suphamongkhon (1914) | กนต์ธีร์ ศุภมงคล | GCVO (* 3 Aug. 1914, Bangkok): married Dootsdi, 27 July 1951. 2 sons.; 1935 LLB, Thammasat University, Bangkok.; 1940: LLD, University of Paris.; Diploma National Defence.; From 1963 to 1965 he was Secretary General of the Foreign Ministry, From 1965 to 1970 he was Thai Ambassador to Germany.; From 1970 to 1976 he was Ambassador in London.; From 1977 to 1979 he was Advisor to the Prime Minister. | Thanom Kittikachorn | Harold Wilson | January 1, 1976 |
| December 19, 1977 | Phan Wannamethee | แผน วรรณเมธี | November 7, 1977 designated. | Kriangsak Chomanan | James Callaghan | September 5, 1984 |
| September 5, 1984 | Owart Suthiwart-Narueput | โอวาท สุทธิวาทนฤพุทธิ | C.M.G. (* 19 September 1926) Married to Angkana. One son and one. Educ. BA, Law, Univ. of Moral and Political Sciences, Bangkok, | Prem Tinsulanonda | Margaret Thatcher | January 1, 1986 |
| November 4, 1986 | Sudhee Prasasvinitchai | สุธี ประศาสน์วินิจฉัย | October 14, 1986 designated.: From 1979 to 1983 he was Thai Ambassador to Germany | Prem Tinsulanonda | Margaret Thatcher | |
| 1988 | Phra Subarn Sompati | | | Chatichai Choonhavan | Margaret Thatcher | |
| October 29, 1991 | Tongchan Jotikasthira | ธงฉาน โชติกเสถียร | Nabthong Thongyai 1986 he was Thai Ambassador to Myanmar | Anand Panyarachun | John Major | |
| November 11, 1994 | Vidhya Rayananonda | วิทย์ รายนานนท์ | 28 Oct 1996, KCVO | Suchinda Kraprayoon | John Major | January 1, 2002 |
| January 21, 2003 | Vikrom Koompirochana | วิกรม คุ้มไพโรจน์ | (* January 23, 1946 in Bangkok): From 1991 to 1995 he was Thai Ambassador to Singapore.; In 1996 he was Thai Ambassador to Malaysia.; From 1997 to 1999 he was Thai Ambassador to New Zealand.; In 2002 he was Thai Ambassador to Italy.; From 2003 to 2006 he was Ambassador in London.; From 2000 to 2001 he was Deputy Permanent Secretary of Foreign Affairs.; He served in the Thai foreign service for 34 years until he reached the statutory retirement age of 60 in 2006. | Thaksin Shinawatra | Tony Blair | January 1, 2006 |
| March 26, 2007 | Kitti Wasinondh | กิตติ วะสีนนท์ | (* November 23, 1951): From 1978 to 1979 he was Attaché then Third Secretary Southeast Asia Division, Department of Political Affairs Ministry of Foreign Affairs.; From 1982 to 1985 he was Third Secretary then Second Secretary, Belgrade.; From 1986 to 1987 he was Second Secretary then First Secretary, Chief of GAAT Section, Division of International Economic Affairs Department of Economic Affairs.; From 1988 to 1990 he was seconded to Royal Thai Army.; In 1991 he was Chief of Secretariat then Chief, Division of Economic Relations; In 1993 he was Minister Counsellor, Brussels; In 1997 he was Director, Commerce and Industry Division, Department of Association of Southeast Asian Nations Affairs; In 1998 he was Deputy Director-General, Department of Information.; In 1999 he was Deputy Director-General, Department of East Asian Affairs.; In 2000 he was Consul-General in Sydney.; In 2002 he was Director-General, Department of Association of Southeast Asian Nations Affairs; In 2006 he was Director-General, Department of Information; In 2007 he became Ambassador Extraordinary and Plenipotentiary to the Court of St James; In 2012 he was retired from diplomatic service; In 2005 he was awarded Knight Grand Cordon (Special Class) of the Most Noble Order of the Crown of Thailand; In 2010 he was awarded with the Knight Grand Cordon of the Exalted Order of the White Elephant | Surayud Chulanont | Tony Blair | |
| October 1, 2012 | Khun Pasan Teparak | ปสันน์ เทพรักษ์ | from 2006 – 2011, served as Consul General at Thai Consulate General in Dubai, where Thaksin Shinawatra has an exile residence. | Yingluck Shinawatra | David Cameron | May 31, 2014 |
| June 9, 2015 | Kittipong Na Ranong | นายกิตติพงษ์ ณ ระนอง | He is a brother of Kittiratt Na-Ranong, 2007 he was Thai Ambassador to Vietnam, 2014 he was the Thai ambassador to Libya. 2016 he became Thai Ambassador to Switzerland. | Prayut Chan-o-cha | David Cameron | |
| November 1, 2016 | Pisanu Suvanajata | พิษณุ สุวรรณะชฎ | From 2009 to Jan 2012 he was Consul General in Guangzhou; From Feb 2012 to Nov 2016 he was Thai Ambassador to Myanmar | Prayut Chan-o-cha | Theresa May | 2022 |
| November 29, 2022 | Thani Thongphakdi | ธานี ทองภักดี | | Prayut Chan-o-cha Srettha Tavisin | | |
| January 6, 2025 | Nadhavathna Krishnamra | ณัฐวัฒน์ กฤษณามระ | | Paetongtarn Shinawatra | Keir Starmer | |

- Thailand–United Kingdom relations
