= Kittiphong Na Ranong =

Thai diplomat

- กิตติพงษ์ ณ ระนอง
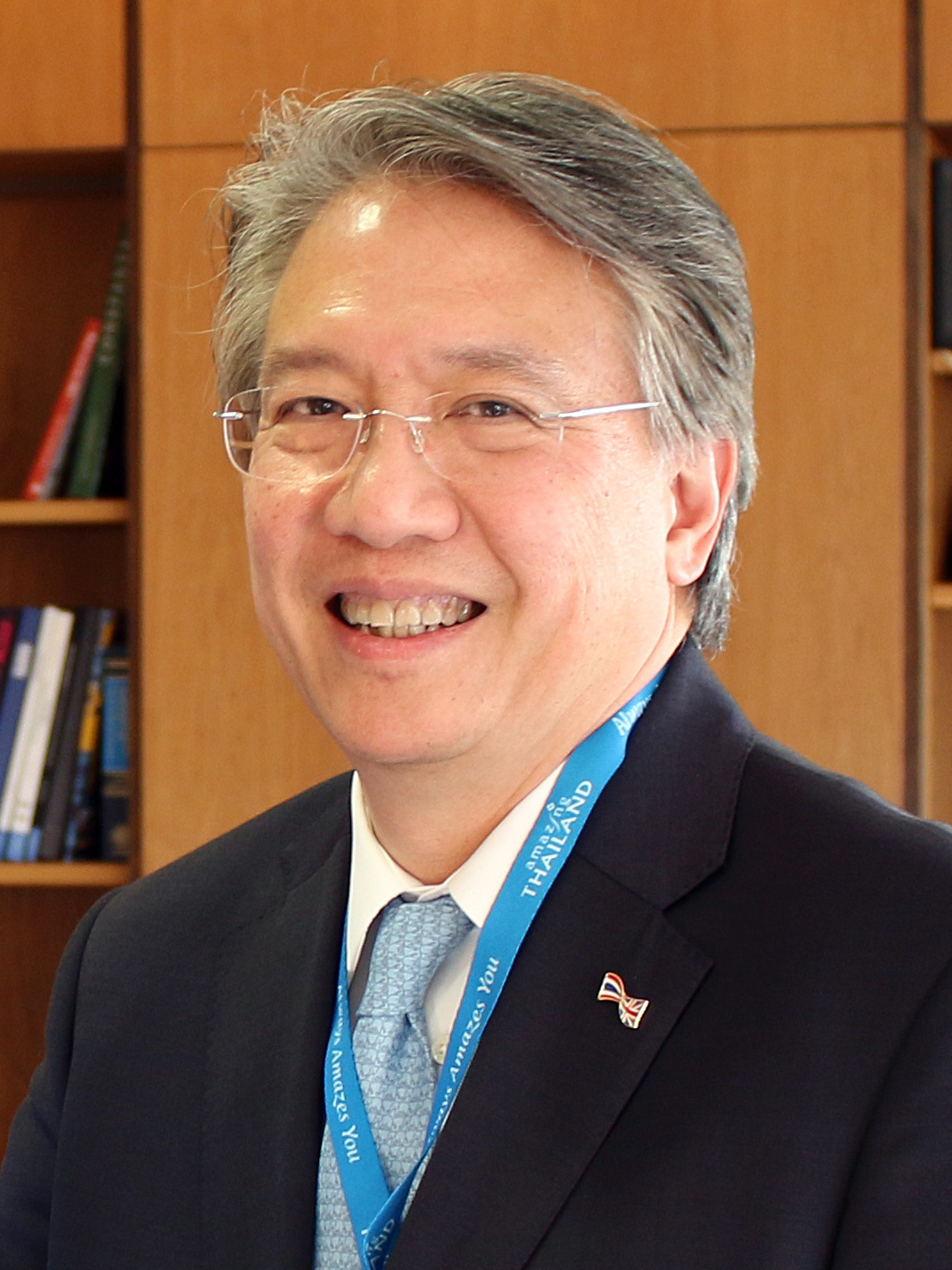

Thai Ambassador to the United Kingdom
- In office 2015–2017
- Monarch: Bhumibol Adulyadej Vajiralongkorn
- Prime Minister: Prayut Chan-o-cha
- Preceded by: Pasan Teparak
- Succeeded by: Pisanu Suvanajata

Thai Ambassador to the United States
- In office 2012–2010
- Monarch: Bhumibol Adulyadej
- Prime Minister: Samak Sundaravej
- Preceded by: Don Pramudwinai
- Succeeded by: Chaiyong Satjipanon

Personal details
- Relations: Kittirat Na Ranong (brother)
- Education: Chulalongkorn University (BA); Tufts University (MA)

Kittiphong Na Ranong (Thai: กิตติพงษ์ ณ ระนอง) is a Thai diplomat and former Thai Ambassador to the United Kingdom from 2015 to 2017. Na Ranong previously served as Thai Ambassador to the United States from 2010 to 2012.
