= Vijavat Isarabhakdi =

Thai diplomat (born 1957)

- วิชาวัฒน์ อิศรภักดี
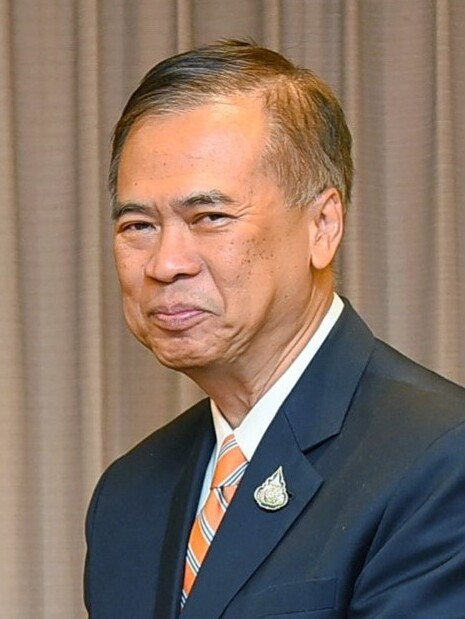

Thai Ambassador to the United States
- In office October 2013 – February 2015
- Monarch: Vajiralongkorn
- Prime Minister: Yingluck Shinawatra; Prayut Chan-o-cha
- Preceded by: Chaiyong Satjipanon
- Succeeded by: Pisan Manawapat

Personal details
- Born: June 28, 1957 (age 68)
- Education: Chulalongkorn University (BA); Tufts University (MA, PhD)

Vijavat Isarabhakdi (Thai: วิชาวัฒน์ อิศรภักดี; born June 28, 1957) is a Thai diplomat and Vice Minister for Foreign Affairs. He served as Thai Ambassador to the United States from 2013 to 2015.
