= Sakchai Bamrungpong =

Thai diplomat, author and journalist (1918–2014)

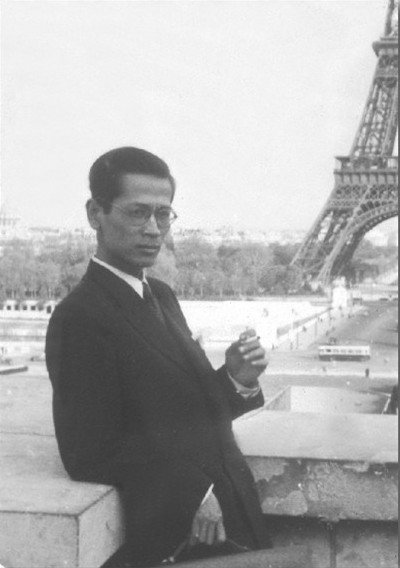
- Born: 12 July 1918; Bang Bo Samut Prakan Province
- Died: 29 November 2014 (aged 96)
- Education: Thammasat University
- Occupations: Diplomat, journalist, author
- Spouse: Kruaphan Pathumros
- Children: 4 Children
- Writing career
- Pen name: Seni Saowapong, Bo Bang Bo, Sucharid Prommachan, Garadnai Prochard, Kumsanati, Vanlaya Silvanlop, Nansima

Sakdichai Bamrungpong (12 July 1918 – 29 November 2014) was a Thai diplomat, author and journalist who wrote under the pen-name of Seni Saowapong.

== Early life ==
Sakdichai Bamrungpong formerly known as “Boon song” was born in a small village. In Bang Bo District, Samut Prakan Province He was the youngest child of Mr. Pong and Mrs. Phae Bamrungpong, a farmer and a village headman. Studied first grade at Wat Chakrawat Rachawat School Secondary school at Bophitphimuk School Entrance examination to the Faculty of Architecture Chulalongkorn University but had to resign when his father died. He became part-time journalist and studied law at Thammasat University he had graduated in 1941 and changed his name to “Sakdichai” during the age of Field Marshal Plaek Phibunsongkhram, Since regulation forcing the names of persons would be clearly separated with the genders.

Since childhood, Sakdichai Bamrungpong applied as a student to learn to draw with Hem Vejakorn and met famous writers who contact at Hem's house such as Saow Boonsung and Manat Janyong, so he started writing short stories and published them with “Sri Krung Sunday” “Krungthep Varasan” at the end of high school 8, his father died, no money for further education So he went to work at the press agency “Sri Krung” and "Siam Rat", the international news department. But resigned with all editors in 1939, when who was editor Ob Chaivasu was forced to resign.

== Government service ==
Sakdichai Bamrungpong began his service at the Foreign Policy Commercial Department of the Ministry of Economics and got a scholarship to study in Germany, but did not return to Germany because the war in Eastern Europe had already begun. Therefore, he travelled back to Thailand and worked as a journalist in "Suvarnabhumi" with Thongterm Sermut, Isara Amantakul. He started writing short stories under the pen name "Sujarit Phromchanya". He became well-known for a short story named "Acacia at the end of summer", this was the first time he used the pen name "Seni Saowapong" which was published in the weekly Tong Nguan newspaper and he later published mainly under this pseudonym.

When World War II broke out, Sakdichai returned to the Ministry of Foreign Affairs at the end of 1942 and joined the British line of Seri Thai (Free Thai movement). At the end of the war he wrote articles in "Nigorn Sunday", "Supabburut-Prachamit", "Ayothaya", "Rung Arun".

After 1947, Sakdichai Bamrungpong served as a diplomat abroad. He lived in Russia (1947-1954), Argentina (1955-1960), India (1962-1965), Austria (1968-1972) and England (1973-1975). He was then Ambassador to Ethiopia in 1975 and retired in the position of Thai Ambassador to Burma in 1978.

== Life after retirement ==
After retirement, Sakdichai Bamrungpong took the position of Chief Advisor in Matichon Group. And has written novels “Kon di Sri Ayutthaya” (1981), “Under the Uranus” (1983), and writes regular articles in newspapers and magazines. Be honored The first Sri Burapha Award in 1988, National Artist Award in the field of Literature of the Year 1990 and the Narathip Award of the Year 1998

He is very well known for writing novels that named The Ghost, especially the sayings of 'The Ghost of time' that reflect The Changes of social and attempts to curb the changes of society that leads to what Sai Sima, the protagonist of the story, called. 'Sleeping terror' With Sai Sima said in front of the elite society:

“… For those of you who are in the castle, there is no need to touch on. Because whatever it is, it will decay over time. You cannot stop the change of time. Late night Old things are getting more and more into the museum.

You misunderstood the idea that I was going to imitate myself. Because it counts as a backward, So much time has passed between your world and my world, so far apart. I am a demon that time has created to haunt people in the old world. Old thoughts cause sleepwalking and fear.

And nothing will be more consoling for these people than nothing will stop the advancement of time to create more and more of these demons. You thought of destroying this demon tonight in front of such a high society, but there was no way it was possible. Because he was more invincible than Achilles or Siegfried. Because he is in the shield of time.”

== Personal life ==
Sakdichai Bamrungpong married Mrs. Kruaphan Pathumros in 1953 and had four children.

== Death ==
Sakdichai died on 29 November 2014 at Bangkok Hospital, where he had been receiving treatment for some time.

== Books ==
- Ghost
- kon di si ayutaya
- Cold frire
- life on death
- No news from Tokyo
- The love of vanlaya
- A drop of The times
- Under the Urenus
- Cold fire in my heart, 84 year of seni suawapong
- Etc.

== Insignia ==
- 1992 - Knight Grand Cordon of the Order of the Crown of Thailand
- 1978 - Knight Grand Cross of the Order of the White Elephant

== Other reference ==
- คำประกาศเกียรติคุณ นายศักดิชัย บำรุงพงศ์ ศิลปินแห่งชาติ
- นายศักดิ์ชัย บำรุงพงศ์ ศิลปินแห่งชาติ สาขาวรรณศิลป์ พุทธศักราช ๒๕๓๓ สกุลไทย ฉบับที่ 2418 ปีที่ 47 ประจำวันอังคารที่ 20 กุมภาพันธ์ 2544
- ประทีป เหมือนนิล. 100 นักประพันธ์ไทย. กรุงเทพ : สุวีริยาสาส์น, 2542. หน้า 479. ISBN 974-8267-78-4
- https://www.tkpark.or.th/eng/articles_detail/221/10-Legendary-Thai-authors-and-their-works
