= Pisan Manawapat =

Thai diplomat

- พิศาล มาณวพัฒน์
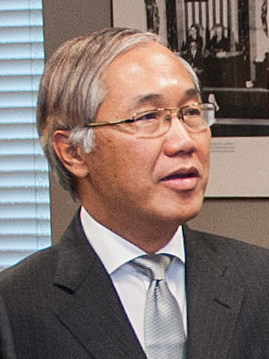

Thai Ambassador to the United States
- In office February 2015 – October 2017
- Monarchs: Bhumibol Adulyadej; Vajiralongkorn
- Prime Minister: Prayut Chan-o-cha
- Preceded by: Vijavat Isarabhakdi
- Succeeded by: Virachai Plasai

Personal details
- Education: Bangkok Christian College Triam Udom Suksa School London School of Economics (BSc (Econ), MSc (Econ)) National Defense College Class 46

Pisan Manawapat (Thai: พิศาล มาณวพัฒน์) is a Thai diplomat and former Thai Ambassador to the United States. He previously served as Thai Ambassador to Belgium, Luxembourg and the European Union, India and Canada. Retired after 36 years in Thailand's foreign service, he was appointed member of the Senate, Thailand's National Assembly from 2019 -2024.

Ambassador Pisan Manawapat is a member of the Board of Faculty of Medicine, Chulalongkorn Foundation, and the Board of Directors, Thailand Development Research Institute (TDRI). He is a regular commentator on foreign affairs for Thailand’s public television.

Ambassador Pisan Manawapat is also a regular guest lecturer at International Institute for Trade and Development (ITD), Devawongse Varopakarn Institute of Foreign Affairs and King Prajadhipok’s Institute.
