= Anand Panyarachun =

Prime Minister of Thailand from 1991 to 1992

Anand Panyarachun ThChW MPCh MVM PBh
- อานันท์ ปันยารชุน
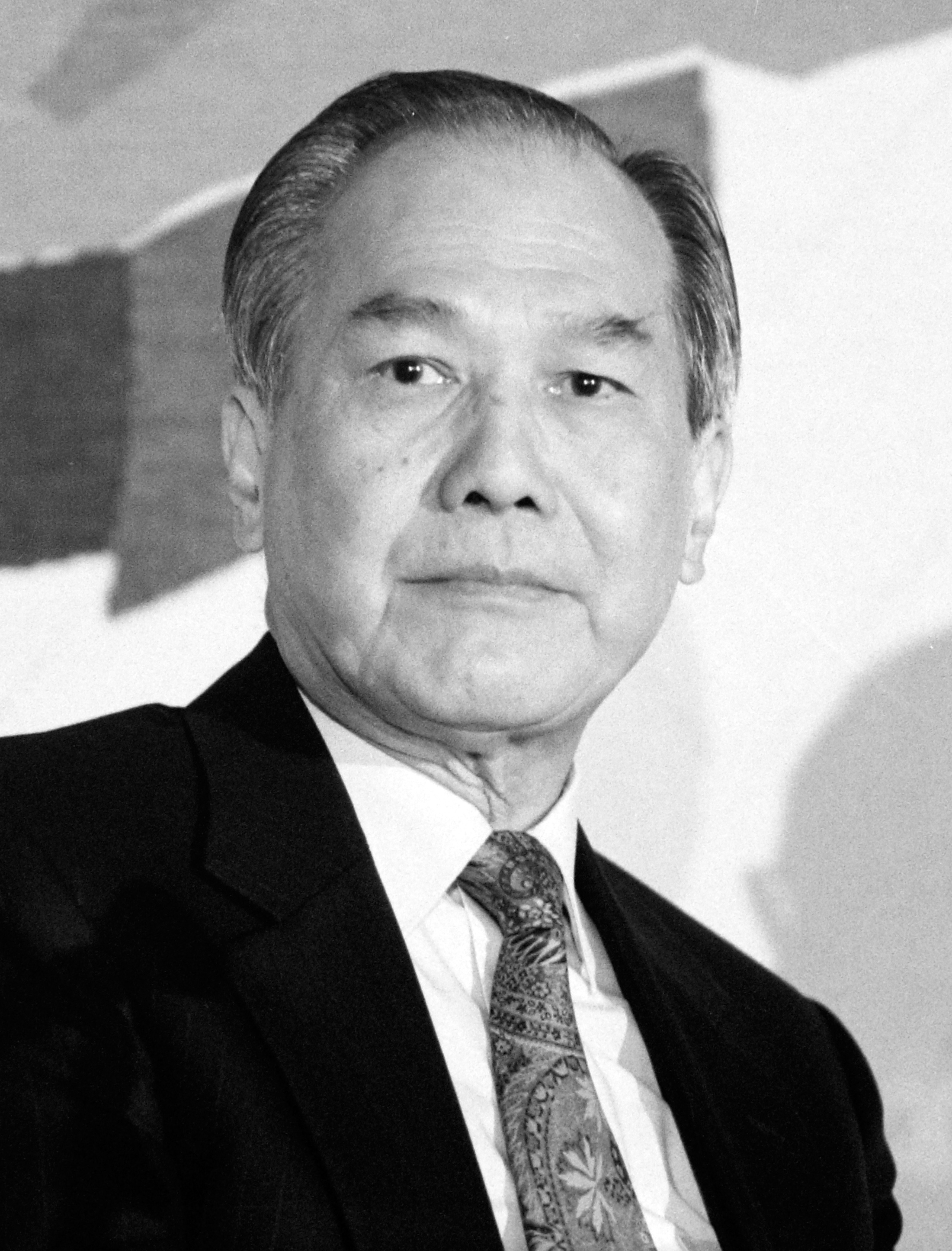
- Anand in 1995

18th Prime Minister of Thailand
- In office 10 June 1992 – 23 September 1992
- Monarch: Bhumibol Adulyadej
- Preceded by: Suchinda Kraprayoon; Meechai Ruchuphan (acting)
- Succeeded by: Chuan Leekpai
- In office 2 March 1991 – 7 April 1992
- Monarch: Bhumibol Adulyadej
- Preceded by: Chatichai Choonhavan; Sunthorn Kongsompong (as Head of the National Peacekeeping Council)
- Succeeded by: Suchinda Kraprayoon

Permanent Secretary for Foreign Affairs
- In office 12 August 1975 – 11 March 1977
- Minister: Chatichai Choonhavan; Bhichai Rattakul; Upadit Pachariyangkun
- Preceded by: Phan Wannamethee
- Succeeded by: Wong Phonnikon

Ambassador of Thailand
- In office to West Germany 1979 – 1984 to the United States 1972 – 1976 to Canada 1967 – 1972 to the United Nations 1964 – 1976

Personal details
- Born: 9 August 1932 (age 94) Bangkok, Krung Thep, Siam (now Bangkok, Thailand)
- Spouse: M.R. Sodsri Panyarachun (née Chakrabandhu) (d. 2023)
- Education: Dulwich College
- Alma mater: Trinity College, Cambridge
- Profession: Diplomat
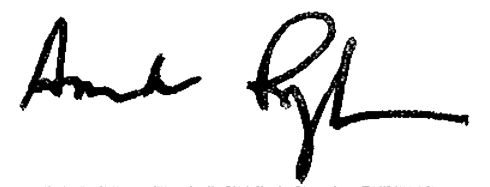
- Signature

Anand Panyarachun (Thai: อานันท์ ปันยารชุน, RTGS: Anan Panyarachun, pronounced [ʔāː.nān pān.jāː.rā.t͡ɕʰūn]; born 9 August 1932) is a Thai retired politician who served as the Prime Minister of Thailand for two terms, first from 1991 to 1992 and again for a brief period during the latter half of 1992. He was effective in initiating economic and political reforms, one of which was the drafting of Thailand's "People's Constitution", which was promulgated in 1997 and abrogated in 2006. Anand received a Ramon Magsaysay Award for Government Service in 1997. He was a supporter of liberal corporatism.

== Education career in civil service and business ==
Anand was the youngest of twelve children of a wealthy family of Mon heritage on his father's side and Thai-Chinese mixed on his mother's. His father, Sern was a son of a high-ranking official of Mon ancestry. His father studied in England on a king's scholarship, and later oversaw all royal schools and thereafter a successful businessman in the 1930s. His paternal grandfather built an ethnic Mon monastery in Ratchaburi called Wat Khao Chon Phran. According to Anand, he inherited his Chinese heritage from his mixed ethnic Chinese-Mon maternal grandmother, whose surname was Lau (Chinese: 刘). His Chinese ancestors came to Thailand in the mid-18th century and eventually became one of the country's most prominent Chinese descent families. He is distantly related to Korn Chatikavanij through this branch of his family. Anand attended Dulwich College and later read law at Trinity College, Cambridge, graduating with honours in 1955.

Anand spent 23 years in the foreign service, serving at times as the Ambassador of Thailand to the United Nations, Canada, the United States, and West Germany. In January 1976 he was appointed Permanent Secretary of the foreign ministry, and played a leading role in ensuring the US military withdrawal from Thailand. Following that year's October coup, Anand was branded a communist by the military during the subsequent political witch hunts, presumably for the Foreign Ministry's role in the normalisation of diplomatic relations between Thailand and the People's Republic of China. Although the civil service panel set up to investigate the allegations cleared him of any wrongdoing, Anand was put into relatively unimportant posts and in 1979 left the public sector for the private. He became the Vice-Chairman of the Saha-Union Group in 1979 and the Chairman of the Board of Directors in 1991. He has been a Director of Siam Commercial Bank since 1984.

== Prime Minister of Thailand (1991–1992, 1992) ==
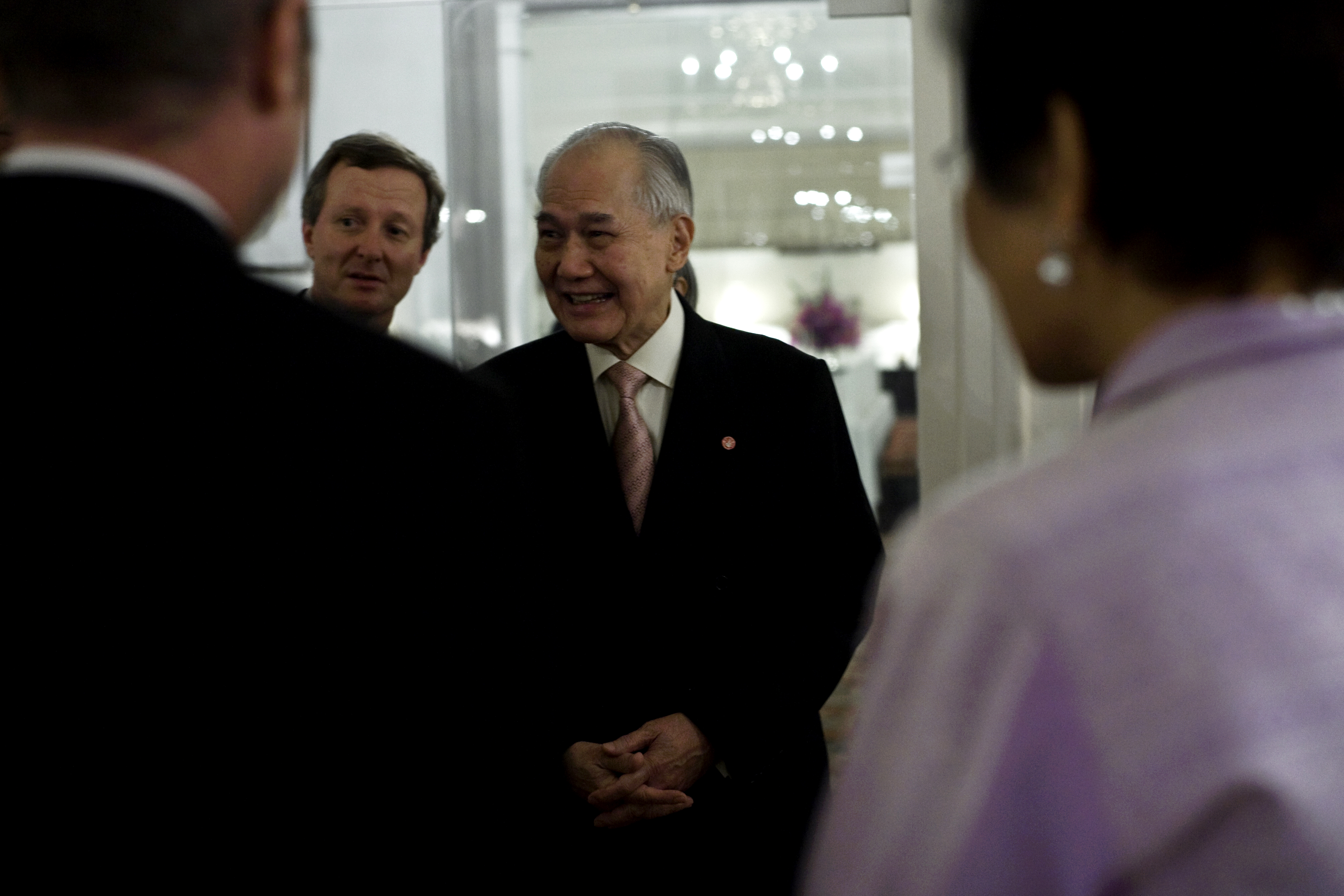
Anand in 2010

=== First premiership (1991–1992) ===
On 23 February 1991, a military coup led by General Sunthorn Kongsompong, supreme commander of the armed forces, and General Suchinda Kraprayoon, the commander-in-chief of the army, imprisoned Chatichai Choonhavan, the democratically elected leader. As in previous Thai coups, the military formed a National Peace Keeping Council (NPKC) to run the country. To shore up its image and gain the trust of King Bhumibol, the NPKC appointed Anand as interim prime minister.

Anand, closely linked to the palace and held in respect by both the bureaucracy and the business community, proved acceptable to the people and the international community. He was regarded as being astute and disciplined, and had never been associated with any financial scandals.

Upon accepting the position of prime minister, Anand was quick to declare that he did not agree with everything the junta had done and that he intended to follow an independent course. He angered the NPKC by suggesting that Chatichai be released immediately upon a cabinet being appointed.

==== Formation ====
The interim constitution that was promulgated on 1 March 1991 reconfirmed the intention of the NKPC to retain substantial control. However, Anand was allowed relative freedom to select his own cabinet members. For the entire period of his premiership Anand faced constant pressure from the junta leaders, who tried to influence government decisions in order to gain financial benefits.

Anand filled his cabinet with well-known academics, technocrats, and ex-bureaucrats with proven records. Various commentators, ranging from the president of the Thailand Development Research Institute to the mass-circulation newspaper Thai Rath, described the cabinet as the most impressive Thailand had ever had. The strong guiding hand of privy councillor Prem Tinsulanonda could be seen. Amongst those selected by Anand were Prem's previous finance minister and economic advisor. A senior diplomat during the years Prem served as prime minister became foreign minister. The technocratic orientation of the cabinet substantially diminished the fears of foreign investors.

==== Reforms ====
Anand's administration proved harder-working than his predecessors. The administration worked on its task of implementing a long list of much-needed reforms. Its emphasis on education, public health, exports, agriculture, industry, environment, and improvement in living conditions, met with widespread approval. In a Bangkok poll in late-July 1991, 61 percent of respondents felt that the Anand government was more honest than previous administrations.

Arguably the most significant of the reforms was a restructuring of the taxation system, which saw the introduction of a value added tax (VAT) and a reduction in corporate and income taxation. Several measures were taken to free up the flow of funds into and out of the country. Thai nationals were allowed to invest abroad without the approval of the Bank of Thailand. Regulations were altered for foreign banks to open branches and the ceiling on bank interest rates was lifted. In addition, the process for obtaining official operating licences for factories was greatly simplified, while the method of allocating textile and tapioca quotas was made more apparent. In the energy sector, price control barriers were dismantled.

The government was also able to successfully conclude agreements for a number of large-scale infrastructure projects initiated by the Chatichai administration. A regulatory board to oversee the privatisation and private investment in infrastructure projects was established. The projects themselves were also to be independently approved and monitored by agencies outside the government in order to minimise the opportunities for corruption.

In an attempt to spread the benefits of the country's economic growth, civil servants were given a 23 percent raise in wages, state employers a 20 percent wage rise, and the minimum wage was raised by 15 percent. In addition to this, the Anand government allocated six billion baht in the fiscal year 1992 budget to be distributed to villages and spent at their discretion.

Key accomplishments of Anand's government include:

- The establishment of the ASEAN Free Trade Area (AFTA)
- A highly effective anti-AIDS/HIV policy.
- Electricity market reform, including the introduction of Independent Power Producers (IPPs) and the initiation of a 10-year liberalisation and privatisation plan for EGAT. Many have noted that Saha-Union Group, which Anand chaired, won a major bid to build a large coal-fired power plant while Anand was in power.
- Award of a multi-billion baht concession to Telecom Asia (today known as True) to build and operate two million telephone lines in Bangkok. It was noted by many that General Suchinda, the coup leader who installed Anand as Prime Minister, was appointed chairman of Telecom Asia after he was toppled from power.
- Suspension of the Hopewell rail-train airport link project.

==== Foreign policy ====
On the international front Anand performed well. Despite international concern over the coup, foreign administrations had sufficient confidence to resume relations quickly. Anand made visits to China in September 1991 and Japan in December 1991, and went on to meetings with President George H. W. Bush in the United States. He was able to shake off the stigma of being a junta-installed prime minister, instead successfully presenting the image of an administration determined to deregulate, cut red tape, and create an environment conductive to free enterprise.

The Anand government's policies to its neighbours followed the lead of his predecessor Chatichai. Relationships with Laos improved significantly, with Thailand allocating one-half of its 200 million baht aid budget to the nation. Thailand under Anand became deeply involved in the Cambodian peace process, while relations with Vietnam went through a period of fence-mending and confidence-building.

The only foreign relations area where there were serious reasons for criticising Anand's administration was Thailand's soft stance towards the repressive military junta of Burma.

==== Disagreements with the NPKC ====
Anand disagreed with the military junta's plans to increase the defence budget. Anand denied the military's request for supplemental funding that would have totalled 53 billion baht. Junta member Air Chief Marshal Kaset Rojananil criticised the government for being too "inefficient" and calling for it to resign. Suchinda justified the military's request by stating that there were still communist fighters in the Indochina region. In November and December Anand publicly repeated his views that the country's security did not lie in military might, but in its economic and political development, on one occasion stating, "Military might is no longer a guarantee of national security. No nation can feel secure as long as its citizens are deprived of freedom of political expression and of the opportunities for a better and more meaningful life."

Anand also voiced disagreement with the junta's draft constitution, although the constitution was ultimately promulgated. At first, he refused to comment as the Constitution Scrutinising Committee, hand-picked by Sunthorn, made changes to what became the final draft constitution. Then on 16 November, Anand spoke out against clauses that gave the appointed 360 member Senate the same powers as elected members of the House of Representatives as well as a clause allowing permanent public officials and military officers to hold political posts. Anand suggested that the Senate be reduced in size. The military-dominated Constitution Drafting Assembly refused to accept his suggestions and voted unanimously to pass the draft. Anand's response was simple: "I'm disappointed".

==== Human rights ====
Anand's refusal to interfere with the junta's actions meant that his administration failed to come to grips with human rights issues. He had a comprehensive environmental bill passed, but it was ignored by the military, which continued its corrupt activities. Not long after it had taken power, the NPKC announced a huge rural development project that would help solve the problems of rural landlessness and encroachment on protected forests, issues that had for decades occupied the king's attention. The military had promised to resettle more than 1.2 million people to permanent farmlands, but instead evicted villagers from forest reserves, where they had lived in some cases for generations, and transferred the lands to corporate plantations. In almost all cases, the army failed to provide new homes and food supplies. When an activist monk led villagers to protest, he and his followers were attacked and arrested.

In mid-June 1991, the outspoken president of the Labour Congress of Thailand, Thanong Phoarn, mysteriously disappeared. The deputy defence minister, a military man, casually brushed the matter aside, claiming that Thanong had probably fled his wife. He has not been seen since.

With respect to the freedom of information, the Anand administration also disappointed many. With the NPKC in full control of the media, any criticism of the military was censored. News of rallies and demonstrations on a wide range of issues of public concern were kept from the public. The transparency of the denials of censorship by the military-dominated Interior Ministry must have been apparent to Anand, but he chose to do nothing about them.

Anand was succeeded by General Suchinda, who was appointed by parliament after general elections.

=== Second premiership (1992) ===
Suchinda resigned on 24 May 1992, following an intervention by the king that ended the violent military crackdown on massive popular protests against his government. The five coalition parties that made up his administration still attempted to cling to power, however, despite calls for their resignation by the opposition and the press, and nominated Air Chief Marshal Somboon Rahong, leader of the Chart Thai Party, for the premiership. At the time it looked as if House Speaker Arthit Urairat was set to submit Somboon's name to the king. Arthit however held back the nomination of Somboon following a meeting with privy councillor Prem, who was thought to have been exerting pressure on behalf of the king. The House Speaker instead announced that no decision would be made until the constitutional amendments were passed on 10 June 1992, adding that the next prime minister would be a civilian.

On 10 June 1992, Arthit surprised the country by recommending Anand's name instead of Somboon's to the king. The announcement was greeted with almost universal approval and even relief. Only the coalition parties of the previous government were dismayed, turning at first on Arthit, who they saw as having betrayed them.

Four days later Anand announced the formation of his cabinet, which included twenty respected technocrats who had held ministerial portfolios during his previous tenure as prime minister. The top tasks of Anand's government were the rehabilitation of the economy, the organisation of free and fair elections, and the removal of top armed forces commanders from their posts.

The Internal Peacekeeping Law, which allowed for the use of military force against demonstrators, was abolished on 29 June, and on 1 August, he removed Air Chief Marshal Kaset, General Issarapong, and General Chainarong, the First Regional Army Commander, from their posts.

Anand was succeeded by democratically elected Chuan Leekpai later in 1992.

== Post-premiership ==
Anand rejoined the Saha-Union Group as chairman after the general elections of 1992. His government had awarded Saha-Union a major Independent Power Producer concession. He resigned from Saha-Union Group in 2002.

=== Constitution Drafting Assembly ===
In 1996, Anand was elected as a member of the Constitution Drafting Assembly and was appointed Chairman of the Drafting Committee. He oversaw the drafting of what became known as the "Peoples' Constitution" of 1997. The constitution was abrogated in 2006 after a military coup against Thaksin Shinawatra that Anand supported. The People's Constitution instituted several important reforms, including:

- Decentralisation of government, including the establishment of elected Tambon Administrative Organisations (TAOs) and Provincial Administrative Organisations (PAOs). School administrations were also decentralised, although opposition from teachers delayed implementation of this reform
- Establishment of several independent government agencies, including the Election Commission, the Office of the Auditor-General, and the National Human Rights Commission
- Stipulated that candidates for parliament must hold at least a bachelor's degree
- Mechanisms to increase political stability by favouring large parties over small ones, and hence singular governments over coalition governments

=== National Reconciliation Commission ===
From March 2005, Anand served as chairman of the National Reconciliation Commission (NRC), tasked with overseeing that peace was restored to the troubled south. A fierce critic of the Thaksin government, Anand frequently criticised his handling of the southern unrest, and in particular the State of Emergency Decree. He has been quoted to have said, "The authorities have worked inefficiently. They have arrested innocent people instead of the real culprits, leading to mistrust among locals. So, giving them broader power may lead to increased violence and eventually a real crisis." Unfortunately, the situation deteriorated from 2005 to 2006, with escalating violence, especially among teachers and civilians. Despite much criticism of the Thaksin-government's policies, Anand refused to submit the NRC's final report, choosing instead to wait for the results of the 2006 legislative election.

Anand finally submitted the NRC's recommendations on 5 June 2006. Among them were

- Introducing Islamic law
- Making ethnic Pattani-Malay (Yawi) an official language of the region
- Establishing an unarmed peacekeeping force
- Establishing a Peaceful Strategic Administrative Centre for southern border provinces

The recommendations were rejected by Privy Council President Prem, who stated, "We cannot accept that [proposal] as we are Thai. The country is Thai and the language is Thai... We have to be proud to be Thai and have the Thai language as the sole national language".

=== Other positions ===
Anand is a member of the Trilateral Commission and the International Advisory Board of American International Group (AIG). Anand is a member of the Carlyle Group and sits on the Carlyle Group's advisory board for Asia-Pacific.

Anand served as UNICEF Ambassador for Thailand since 1996. During November 2003 and December 2004, Anand was requested by then United Nations Secretary-General Kofi Annan to chair the High-Level Panel on Threats, Challenges and Change of the United Nations. The panel of former presidents, prime ministers, and scholars was tasked to prepare recommendations for possible UN reform.

== Support for the 2006 military coup ==
Anand supported the 2006 military coup that abrogated the People's Constitution and overthrew the government of Thaksin Shinawatra. Anand had been a sharp critic of Thaksin for several years prior to the coup, and he blamed the coup on Thaksin. He also stated fears that the military junta would fail and that Thaksin could make a comeback. Anand claimed that the coup was well received by the people and that the military junta's ban against opposition or political activity would not last long. He also noted surprise at the international community's condemnation to the coup.

== Criticism of Crown Prince Vajiralongkorn ==
In a private meeting with US Ambassador Ralph Boyce, whose post-meeting report was leaked by WikiLeaks, Anand was critical of Crown Prince Vajiralongkorn. Anand stated that the kingdom would be better off if the Crown Prince did not succeed his father; however, he noted that King Bhumibol was unlikely to change the succession. Anand also said that the Prince's succession would face "complicating factors" if he continued interfering in politics and making "embarrassing financial transactions". According to Anand, most Thai citizens believed that the Prince would not be able to change his behaviour.

Anand neither confirmed nor denied that he made the statements. Anand's alleged negative opinion of the Crown Prince was repeated by Privy Counsellor Prem Tinsulanonda and Siddhi Savetsila in their meetings with the US Ambassador, the reports of which were all leaked by Wikileaks. Criticism of the royal family is illegal in Thailand.

== Royal decorations ==
Anand has received the following royal decorations in the Honours System of Thailand:

- 1991 - Knight Grand Cordon (Special Class) of the Most Exalted Order of the White Elephant
- 1988 - Knight Grand Cordon (Special Class) of The Most Noble Order of the Crown of Thailand
- 2003 - Knight Grand Cross (First Class) of the Most Admirable Order of the Direkgunabhorn
- 1991 - Knight Grand Commander (Second Class, higher grade) of the Most Illustrious Order of Chula Chom Klao
- 1967 - King Rama IX Royal Cypher Medal (Third Class)

=== Foreign decorations ===
- 1961 - Commander of the Order of Merit of the Italian Republic (Third Class)
- 1970 - Order of Diplomatic Service Merit Grand Gwanghwa Medal (First Class), Republic of Korea
- 1971 - Star of Merit 1st Class, Indonesia
- 1990 - Grand Officer of the Order of the Crown (Second Class), Belgium
- 1991 - Grand Cordon of the Order of the Rising Sun, Japan
- 1996 - Honorary Knight Commander of the Civil Division of the Most Excellent Order of the British Empire (KBE), United Kingdom
- 2007 - Commander Grand Cross of the Royal Order of the Polar Star, Sweden

== Volunteer Defense Corps of Thailand rank ==
- Volunteer Defense Corps General (Honour rank)

== See also ==
- List of prime ministers of Thailand
- Constitution of Thailand

Political offices
Preceded by Chatichai Choonhavan	Prime Minister of Thailand; 1991–1992	Succeeded by Suchinda Kraprayoon
Preceded by Meechai Ruchuphan	Prime Minister of Thailand; 1992	Succeeded by Chuan Leekpai
