= Thani Thongphakdi =

Thai diplomat

- ธานี ทองภักดี
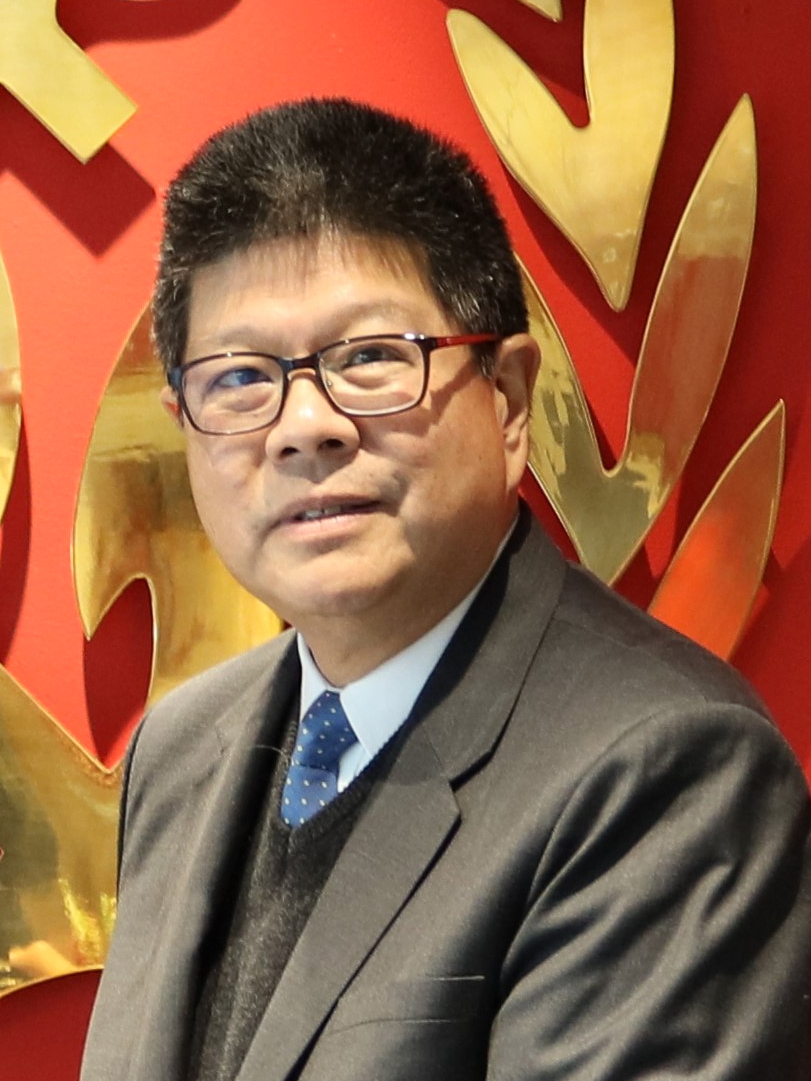

Thai Ambassador to the United Kingdom
- Incumbent
- Assumed office November 29, 2022
- Monarch: Vajiralongkorn
- Prime Minister: Prayut Chan-o-cha; Srettha Thavisin
- Preceded by: Pisanu Suvanajata

Thai Ambassador to Ireland
- Incumbent
- Assumed office November 29, 2022
- Monarch: Vajiralongkorn
- Prime Minister: Prayut Chan-o-cha; Srettha Thavisin
- Preceded by: Pisanu Suvanajata

Thai Ambassador to the United States
- In office 2019–2020
- Monarch: Vajiralongkorn
- Prime Minister: Prayut Chan-o-cha
- Preceded by: Virachai Plasai
- Succeeded by: Manasvi Srisodapol

Personal details
- Education: Australian National University (BEc, BS); Georgetown University (MS)

Thani Thongphakdi (Thai: ธานี ทองภักดี) is a Thai Courtier (Special Attached Officer to the Bureau of the Royal Household Level 11 (Thai: ประจำสำนักพระราชวังพิเศษระดับ ๑๑) and formerly a Thai diplomat and the Thai Ambassador to the United Kingdom and Ireland from 2022 to 2024. Thani previously served as the Permanent Secretary for Foreign Affairs from 2020 to 2022, and as Thai Ambassador to the United States from 2019 to 2020.
