= Chaiyong Satjipanon =

Thai diplomat (born 1953)

Dr. Chaiyong Satjipanon
- ชัยยงค์ สัจจิพานนท์
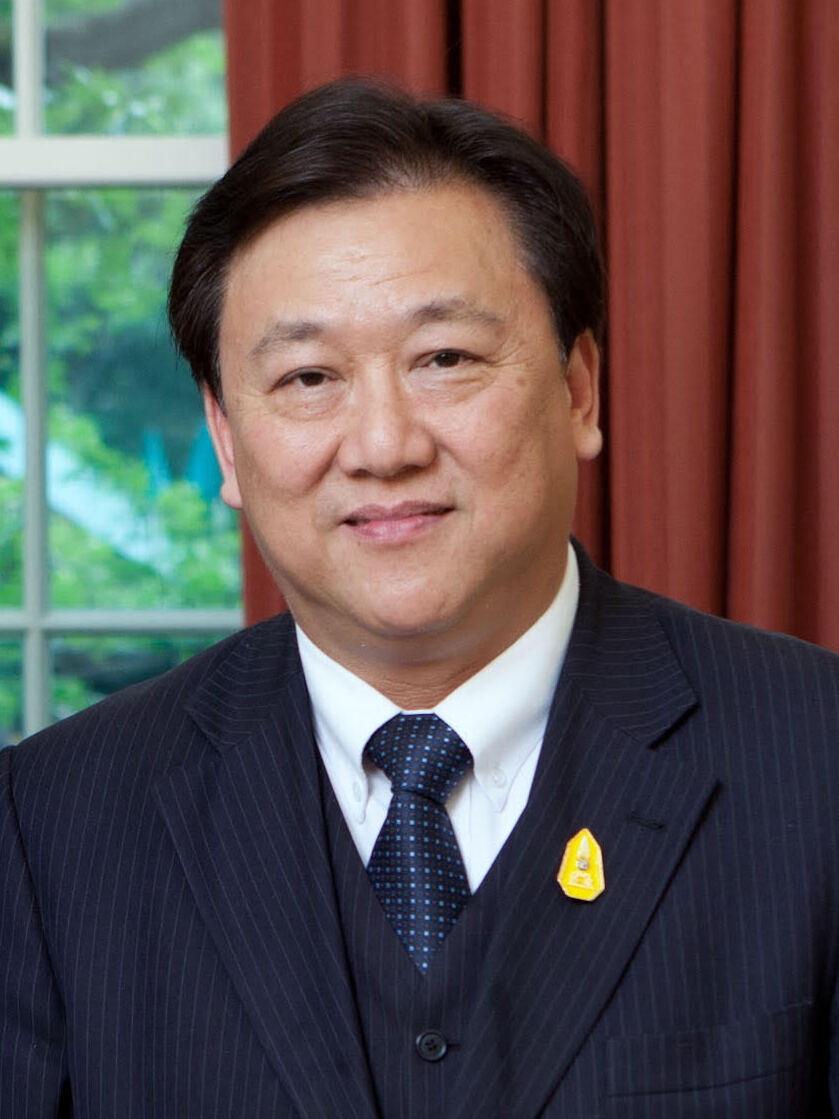

Thai Ambassador to the United States
- In office 18 April 2012 – 2 May 2012
- Monarch: Bhumibol Adulyadej
- Prime Minister: Yingluck Shinawatra
- Preceded by: Kittiphong Na Ranong
- Succeeded by: Vijavat Isarabhakdi

Personal details
- Born: 14 September 1953 (age 73) Bangkok, Thailand
- Education: Chulalongkorn University; Fletcher School of Law and Diplomacy
- Profession: Diplomat

Dr. Chaiyong Satjipanon (Thai: ชัยยงค์ สัจจิพานนท์, born 14 September 1953) is a former Thai Ambassador to the United States. Prior to representing Thailand to the United States, he represented Thailand in Geneva, Sydney, Seoul, Rome and Jakarta.

== Early life ==
Chaiyong Satjipanon was born on 14 September 1953. He received a Bachelor of Arts degree (with honors) in political science from Chulalongkorn University in Bangkok, where he would also earn a Master of Public Administration degree. He would go on to earn a Master of Arts in Law and Diplomacy and a PhD from The Fletcher School of Law and Diplomacy at Tufts University in the United States.

== Career ==
Chaiyong Satjipanon began his diplomatic career in 1975 when he joined the Ministry of Foreign Affairs as an attache to the International Conference Division of the Department of International Organizations. In 1976 he became Thailand's liaison officer to the United Nations Economic and Social Commission for Asia and the Pacific (ESCAP), before becoming the Third Secretary of the International Conference division one year later. In 1982 he was transferred to Geneva, Switzerland and became was the Second Secretary of Thailand's Permanent Mission to the United Nations Office and Other International Organizations in Geneva, and was promoted to First Secretary of the same office in 1986. He held that post until 1989 when he became a Counsellor for the Americas Division of the Department of Political Affairs. In 1993 he was promoted to Deputy Director-General of the Department of Economic Affairs. In 1994 he was assigned to be the Consular-General of the Royal Thai Consulate-General in Sydney, Australia. In 2001 he became Thailand's Ambassador Extraordinary and Plenipotentiary to the Republic of Indonesia, being concurrently accredited to Papua New Guinea. In 2006, Makarim Wibisono, Indonesia's Ambassador to the United Nations and Other International Organizations in Geneva, presented Chaiyong with the First Class Order of Services Bintang Jasa Utama for his work in strengthening bilateral relations between Indonesia and Thailand. In 2003, he became Thailand's Ambassador to the United Nations Office and other international organizations in Geneva. In 2007, he was appointed Thailand's ambassador to the Holy See, and was received by Pope Benedict XVI on 13 December. He was concurrently Thailand's ambassador to Switzerland. In 2010 Dr Chaiyong Satjipanon was 2010 received Order of Knighthood of St. Gregory the Great from the Vatican City State.

Chaiyong Satjipanon was later Thailand's Ambassador to the Republic of Korea, where he worked to expand bilateral trade between Thailand and South Korea. While in Seoul his wife, Thitinart Satjipanon, became ill and died after arriving at Soonchunhyang Hospital. He filed a criminal complaint against the hospital claiming negligence of the staff had resulted in his wife's death, and his case was supported by Thailand's Embassy and Ministry of Foreign Affairs, who called on the South Korean government to investigate medical standards at the hospital. Most recently, he was appointed Thailand's ambassador to the United States. His credentials were accepted by William J. Burns, the United States Deputy Secretary of State, on 18 April 2012.

He is the expert on the United States and Human Rights which he often appears as a TV guest in the Nation, TNN, TNN24.
