= List of ambassadors of Thailand to the United States =

Coordinates: 38.903333°N 77.063056°W

Ambassador of Thailand to the United States Embassy of Thailand in Washington, D.C.
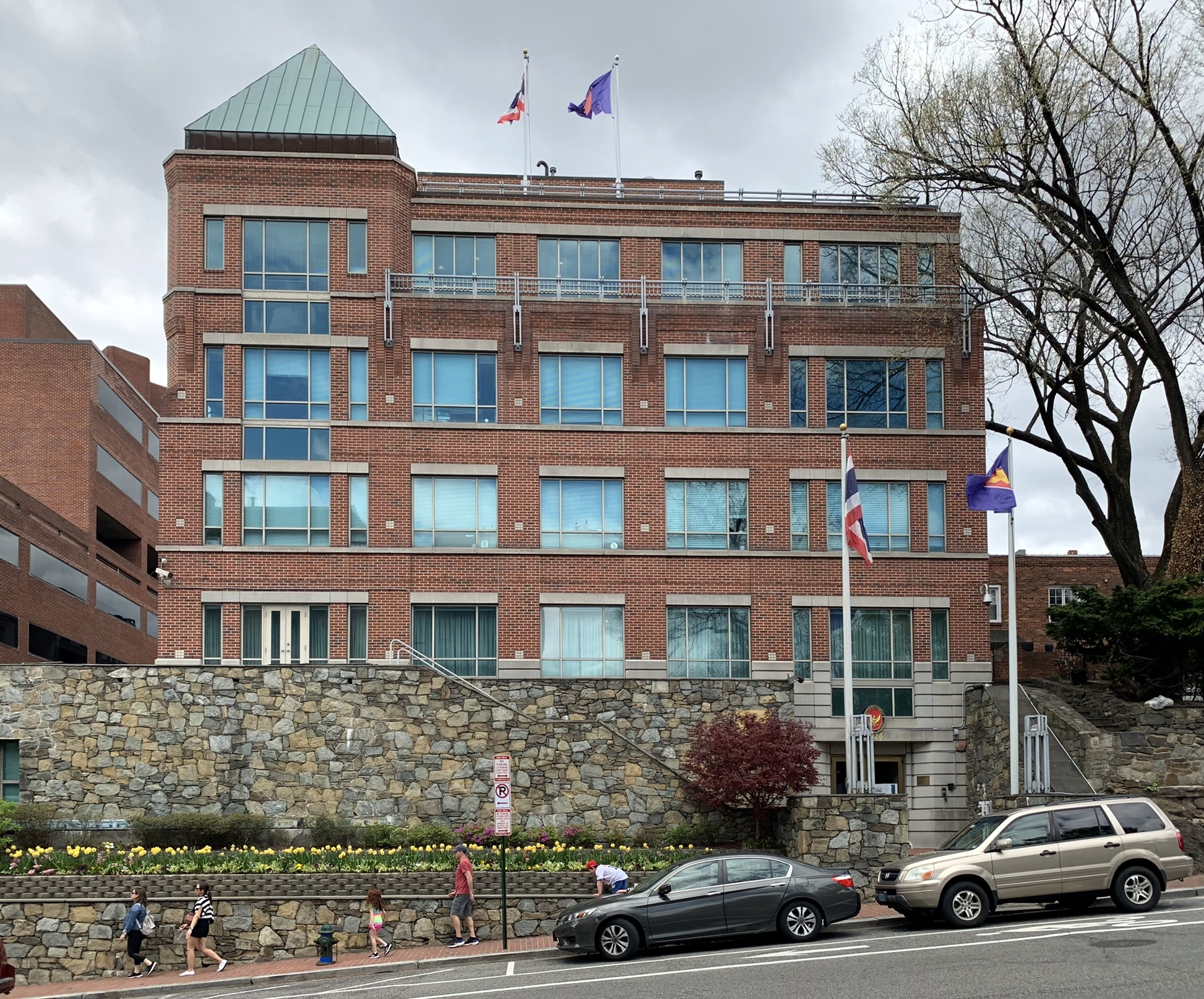
- Incumbent; Suriya Chindawongse since June 2024
- Inaugural holder: Phra Suriya Nuvatr
- Formation: November 1, 1893

The Thai Ambassador in Washington, D.C. is the official representative of the Royal Thai Government in Bangkok to the Government of the United States. The position is held by Suriya Chindawongse.

== List of representatives ==
Agrément/designated	Diplomatic accreditation	Ambassador	Thai name	Observations	List of prime ministers of Thailand	List of presidents of the United States	Term end
November 1, 1893		Phra Suriya Nuvatr	พระสุริยานุรัตน์	Chargé d'affaires After the Paknam incident he was sent from London to Washington, D.C. to search for Arbitration in the Franco-Siamese crisis, Listed as SIAM,	Chulalongkorn	Grover Cleveland	
April 1, 1894				Legation replaced	Chulalongkorn	Grover Cleveland	June 1, 1894
June 2, 1894		Marquis de Maha Yotha		Envoy Extraordinary and Minister Plenipotentiary	Chulalongkorn	Grover Cleveland	
August 1, 1895				Legation replaced	Chulalongkorn	Grover Cleveland	December 1, 1898
November 12, 1898		Visuddha Suriyasakti		In 1903 he was Thai Ambassador to the United Kingdom, 1903: M. Phya Visuddha Suriyasakti, Son Envoyé extraordinaire et Ministre plénipotentiaire à la Haye et à Londres. Phya means Marquis	Chulalongkorn	William McKinley	
December 1, 1899	April 16, 1900	Phya Prasiddhi		with residence in London. Thai Ambassador to the United Kingdom	Chulalongkorn	William McKinley	
December 13, 1901		Akharaj Varadhara		Phya =Marquis de	Chulalongkorn	Theodore Roosevelt	
May 22, 1912		Prince Traidos Prabandh		In 1927 he headed the Ministry of Foreign Affairs (Thailand)	Vajiravudh	William Howard Taft	
December 8, 1913		Phya Prabha Karavongse			Vajiravudh	Woodrow Wilson	
May 26, 1921	May 26, 1921	Sanpakitch Preencha	พระยาสรรพกิจปรีชา	Chargé d'affaires	Vajiravudh	Warren G. Harding	
April 27, 1923		Phya Buri Navarasth	พญาบุรีนวรัฐ	(Died February 7, 1926)	Vajiravudh	Calvin Coolidge	
February 8, 1926		Pra Sundara Vachana		Chargé d'affaires	Prajadhipok	Calvin Coolidge	
October 15, 1926		Phya Vijitavongs	พลโทพญาวิจัชวงศ์	Lt. Gen.	Prajadhipok	Calvin Coolidge	
May 29, 1929		Prince Amoradat Kridakara	พลเอกเจ้าอาวาสรามาธิบดี	Maj. Gen.	Prajadhipok	Herbert C. Hoover	
January 5, 1932		Phya Subarn Sompati			Phraya Manopakorn Nititada	Herbert C. Hoover	
April 11, 1933		Prince Pridi Debyabongs Devakula	พลตรี หม่อมเจ้าปรีดิเทพย์พงศ์ เทวกุล	From 1930 to 1931 he was Thai Ambassador to Germany	Phraya Phahon Phonphayuhasena	Franklin D. Roosevelt	
August 15, 1935	August 21, 1935	Phya Abhibal Rajamaitri		(* March 7, 1885 in Bangkok) Son of Chao Phya Surawongs and Yai Bunnag.: 1901–1904 studied at Malvern College, England.; 1909 Bachelor of Laws, King's College, Cambridge, England.; 1910 Barrister-at-law, Inner Temple, London, England.; 1915 Teru. Barrister-at-law, Siam.; From 1930 to 1932 he was Thai Ambassador to Italy, Envoy Extraordinary anu Minister Plenipotentiary of Siam to Rome.; From 1 September 1933 – 22 September 1934 he was State councillor of Siam for foreign affairs, while Tom Bunnag was Foreign minister.; In 1935 he became Envoy Extraordinary anu Minister Plenipotentiary of Siam to Washington, D.C.; From 1933 to 1935 he was Member Assembly of People's Representatives.; From July 8, 1948, to May 15, 1958, he was Thai Ambassador to China.	Phraya Phahon Phonphayuhasena	Franklin D. Roosevelt	June 24, 1940
August 1, 1939				Listed as THAILAND	Plaek Phibunsongkhram	Franklin D. Roosevelt	
June 18, 1940	June 24, 1940	Seni Pramoj	th:หม่อมราชวงศ์เสนีย์ ปราโมช	October 1945Listed as SIAM	Plaek Phibunsongkhram	Franklin D. Roosevelt	
January 16, 1949		Thanat Khoman		Chargé d'affaires	Plaek Phibunsongkhram	Harry S. Truman	
March 26, 1947				Legation raised to Embassy, Effective date of elevation of Mission was date of President's approval of agreement.	Khuang Aphaiwong	Harry S. Truman	
April 14, 1947	April 18, 1947	Wan Waithayakon	th:พระเจ้าวรวงศ์เธอ พระองค์เจ้าวรรณไวทยากร กรมหมื่นนราธิปพงศ์ประพันธ์		Khuang Aphaiwong	Harry S. Truman	
November 8, 1947				relations served after the Siamese coup d'état of 1947	Khuang Aphaiwong	Harry S. Truman	March 6, 1948
June 5, 1952	June 12, 1952	Pote Sarasin	th:พจน์ สารสิน		Plaek Phibunsongkhram	Harry S. Truman	
September 10, 1947	October 14, 1957	Thanat Khoman	th:ถนัด คอมันตร์		Khuang Aphaiwong	Harry S. Truman	
May 12, 1959	June 1, 1959	Visutr Arthayukti		September 18, 1958 nine days after a riot in Bangkok concerning Preah Vihear, Thailand's deputy foreign minister Visutr Arthayukti told U. Alexis Johnson, the US ambassador in Bangkok, that the Thai government had word from the South Vietnamese that a "coup to overthrow Norodom Sihanouk would shortly take place.; December 19, 1963 he was Thai Ambassador to Sweden.	Sarit Thanarat	Dwight D. Eisenhower	
October 29, 1963	December 19, 1963	Sukich Nimmanheminda			Thanom Kittikachorn	Lyndon B. Johnson	
December 20, 1967	January 19, 1968	Bunchana Atthakor			Thanom Kittikachorn	Lyndon B. Johnson	
September 16, 1969	October 10, 1969	Sunthorn Hongladarom	th:สุนทร หงส์ลดารมภ์		Thanom Kittikachorn	Richard Nixon	
September 13, 1972	October 2, 1972	Anand Panyarachun	th:อานันท์ ปันยารชุน		Thanom Kittikachorn	Richard Nixon	
January 19, 1976	February 9, 1976	Upadit Pachariyangkun	th:อุปดิศร์ ปาจรียางกูร		Seni Pramoj	Gerald Ford	
October 22, 1976		Sukho Suwansiri		Chargé d'affaires	Seni Pramoj	Gerald Ford	
April 26, 1977	May 13, 1977	Arun Panupong	อรุณ ภาณุพงศ์		Kriangsak Chamanan	Jimmy Carter	
January 17, 1978		Sukho Suwansiri		Chargé d'affaires	Kriangsak Chamanan	Jimmy Carter	
July 24, 1978	August 2, 1978	Klos Visessurakarn			Kriangsak Chamanan	Jimmy Carter	
June 26, 1980	August 22, 1980	Prok Amaranand			Prem Tinsulanonda	Jimmy Carter	
November 9, 1982	November 22, 1982	Kasem S. Kasemsri	th:หม่อมราชวงศ์เกษมสโมสร เกษมศรี	Kasemsamosorn Kasemsri	Prem Tinsulanonda	Ronald Reagan	
September 30, 1985	November 24, 1985	Arsa Sarasin	th:อาสา สารสิน		Prem Tinsulanonda	Ronald Reagan	
April 13, 1988	July 5, 1988	Vitthya Vejjajiva			Chatichai Choonhavan	Ronald Reagan	
May 23, 1991	June 11, 1991	Birabhongse Kasemsri	th:หม่อมหลวงพีระพงศ์ เกษมศรี		Anand Panyarachun	George H. W. Bush	
June 23, 1994		Manaspas Xuto	มนัสพาสน์ ชูโต		Suchinda Kraprayoon	Bill Clinton	
January 25, 1996	February 6, 1996	Nitya Pibulsonggram	th:นิตย์ พิบูลสงคราม		Chavalit Yongchaiyudh	Bill Clinton	
April 7, 2000	June 14, 2000	Tej Bunnag	th:เตซ บุนนาค		Chuan Leekpai	Bill Clinton	
November 27, 2001	December 12, 2001	Sakthip Krairiksh	ศักดิ์ทิพย์ ไกรฤกษ์		Thaksin Shinawatra	George W. Bush	
July 12, 2004	July 15, 2004	Kasit Piromya	th:กษิต ภิรมย์		Thaksin Shinawatra	George W. Bush	
February 10, 2006	March 13, 2006	Virasakdi Futrakul	th:วีระศักดิ์ ฟูตระกูล		Surayud Chulanont	George W. Bush	
April 26, 2007	July 25, 2007	Krit Garnjana Goonchorn	th:กฤษณ์ กาญจนกุญชร		Surayud Chulanont	George W. Bush	
July 17, 2009	July 20, 2009	Don Pramudwinai	th:ดอน ปรมัตถ์วินัย		Samak Sundaravej	Barack Obama	
December 6, 2010	December 7, 2010	Kittiphong Na Ranong	th:กิตติพงษ์ ณ ระนอง		Samak Sundaravej	Barack Obama	
April 18, 2012	May 2, 2012	Chaiyong Satjipanon	th:ชัยยงค์ สัจจิพานนท์		Yingluck Shinawatra	Barack Obama	
October 25, 2013	December 3, 2013	Vijavat Isarabhakdi	th:วิชาวัฒน์ อิศรภักดี		Yingluck Shinawatra	Barack Obama	May 7, 2014
February 18, 2015	February 23, 2015	Pisan Manawapat	th:พิศาล มาณวพัฒน์		Prayut Chan-o-cha	Barack Obama	August 22, 2023
June 2018		Virachai Plasai	th:วีรชัย พลาศรัย	Died March 16, 2019	Prayut Chan-o-cha	Donald Trump	March 16, 2019
August 2019	January 6, 2021	Thani Thongphakdi	ธานี ทองภักดี		Prayut Chan-o-cha	Donald Trump	September 2020
2021		Manasvi Srisodapol	มนัสวี ศรีโสดาพล		Prayut Chan-o-cha	Joe Biden	September 2022
November 2022	December 12, 2022	Tanee Sangrat	ธานี แสงรัตน์		Prayut Chan-o-cha Srettha Tavisin	Joe Biden	May 2024
June 2024	June 17, 2024	Suriya Chindawongse	สุริยา จินดาวงษ์		Srettha Tavisin Paetongtarn Shinawatra	Joe Biden	

- United States–Thailand relations
