= Codman Carriage House and Stable =

Historic building in Washington, D.C.

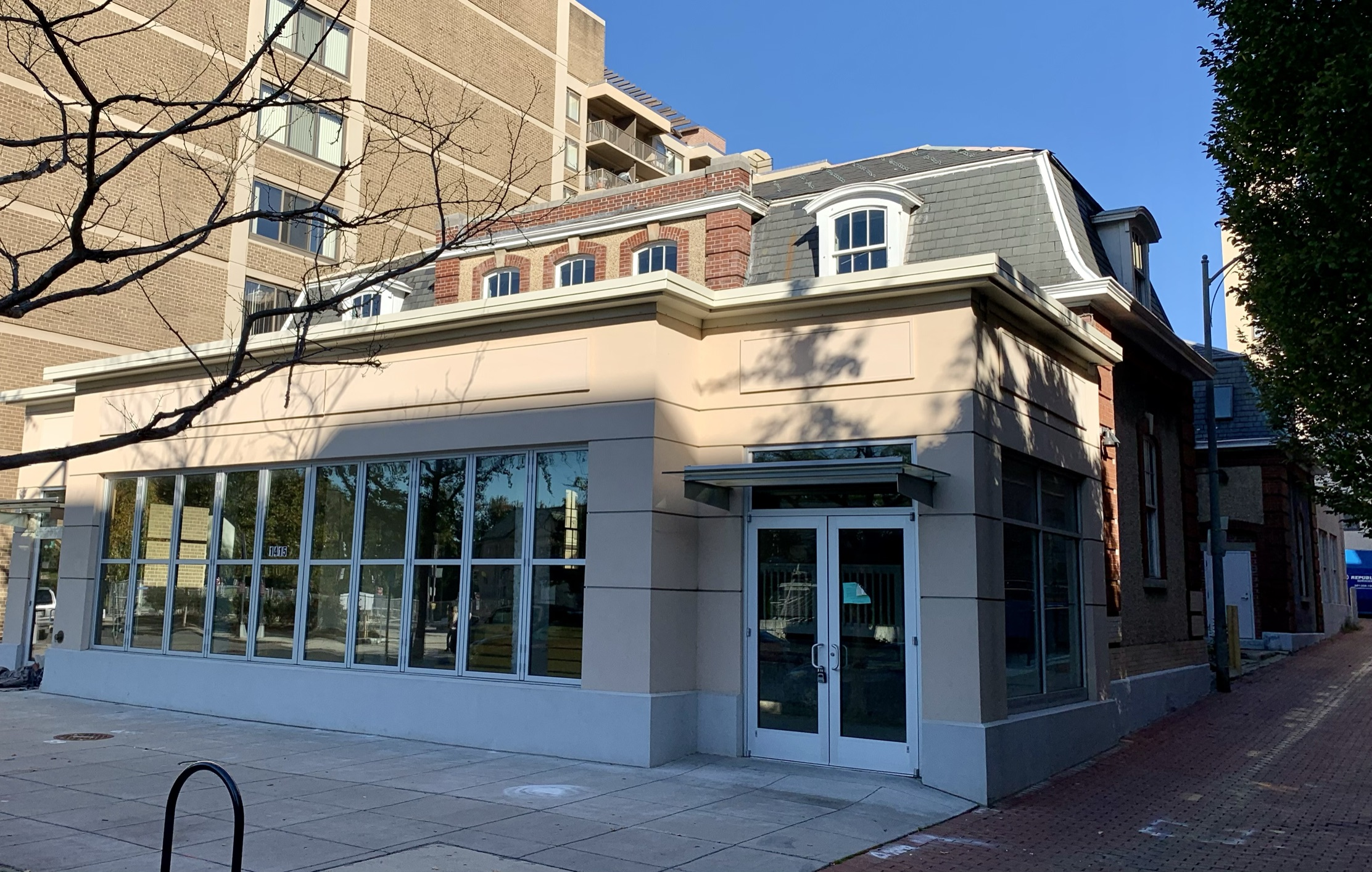
- Codman Carriage House and Stable in 2020
- Interactive map of the Codman Carriage House and Stable area

General information
- Architectural style: Second Empire
- Location: 1415 22nd Street NW
- Coordinates: 38.909011°N 77.048806°W
- Completed: 1907

Design and construction
- Architect: Ogden Codman Jr.
- Designations

U.S. Historic district – Contributing property
- Official name: Dupont Circle Historic District
- Designated: June 10, 2005
- Reference no.: 05000539

D.C. Inventory of Historic Sites
- Designated: December 19, 1995

The Codman Carriage House and Stable is a historic building located at 1415 22nd Street NW (also listed as 1413-1415 22nd Street NW) in the Dupont Circle neighborhood of Washington, D.C. The industrial building was constructed in 1907 as a carriage house and stable for socialite and art collector Martha Catherine Codman, who lived a few blocks north in her home, later known as the Codman–Davis House. She commissioned her cousin, Ogden Codman Jr., an architect and prominent interior decorator who also designed her home. He designed it in a Second Empire style.

This building served as a carriage house and stable for ten years before it was converted into a garage. In addition to housing horses and later cars, the building contained living quarters for two of Codman's employees and their families. Codman later married and sold the building in 1940. It was expanded and remodeled as office space. For more than 25 years, the building housed a Goodyear store before the space was converted into a bar and restaurant. The building was nearly demolished in the early 1980s, but the plan was canceled. A gay bar, Badlands, opened in 1983 and was later renamed Apex. After Apex closed in 2011, the longtime Capitol Hill lesbian bar Phase 1 opened a second location in this building. The bar closed in 2013. The building was renovated and restored a few years later, and it now serves again as office space.

The Codman Carriage House and Stable was added to the District of Columbia Inventory of Historic Sites in 1995. It was designated as a contributing property to the Dupont Circle Historic District when the district's boundary was expanded in 2005. It is one of three former stables in the immediate area that are designated historic landmarks.

== History ==
=== Industrial use ===
In the late 19th and early 20th centuries, the Dupont Circle neighborhood in Washington, D.C. was an area of a large number of elegant and impressive homes owned by businesspeople, politicians, and other members of high society. Their residential properties often included a carriage house or stable located behind their houses or in a nearby alley. Some of these industrial buildings were designed by prominent architects and featured elaborate architectural details. On the west side of the neighborhood, three such buildings were constructed in the early 1900s.

The Walsh Stable, located in an alley bounded by 21st Street, 22nd Street, P Street, and Massachusetts Avenue NW, was built in 1903 for millionaire miner Thomas Walsh. The stable was erected a few hundred feet from his mansion, the Walsh-McLean House. In 1905 the Spencer Carriage House and Stable was constructed in the Twining Court alley, bounded by 21st Street, 22nd Street, O Street, and P Street NW. It was built for railroad executive Samuel Spencer, who lived two blocks away at 2012 Massachusetts Avenue NW.

In 1906 Martha Codman (1856–1948) had a large house built in Washington, D.C., to serve as her winter residence. She was a wealthy socialite, philanthropist, and art collector, who had inherited a large amount of money from her parents, Martha Pickman Rogers and John Amory Codman, a businessman who earned his fortune in the clipper ship trade. Like many wealthy people of the period, Codman split her time between winter and summer residences; the latter was in Newport, Rhode Island. In 1907, she chose her cousin, architect Ogden Codman Jr., to design the new house. The Classical Revival mansion he designed for her, the Codman–Davis House, was built at 2145 Decatur Place NW, on the edge of the Dupont Circle and Sheridan-Kalorama neighborhoods.

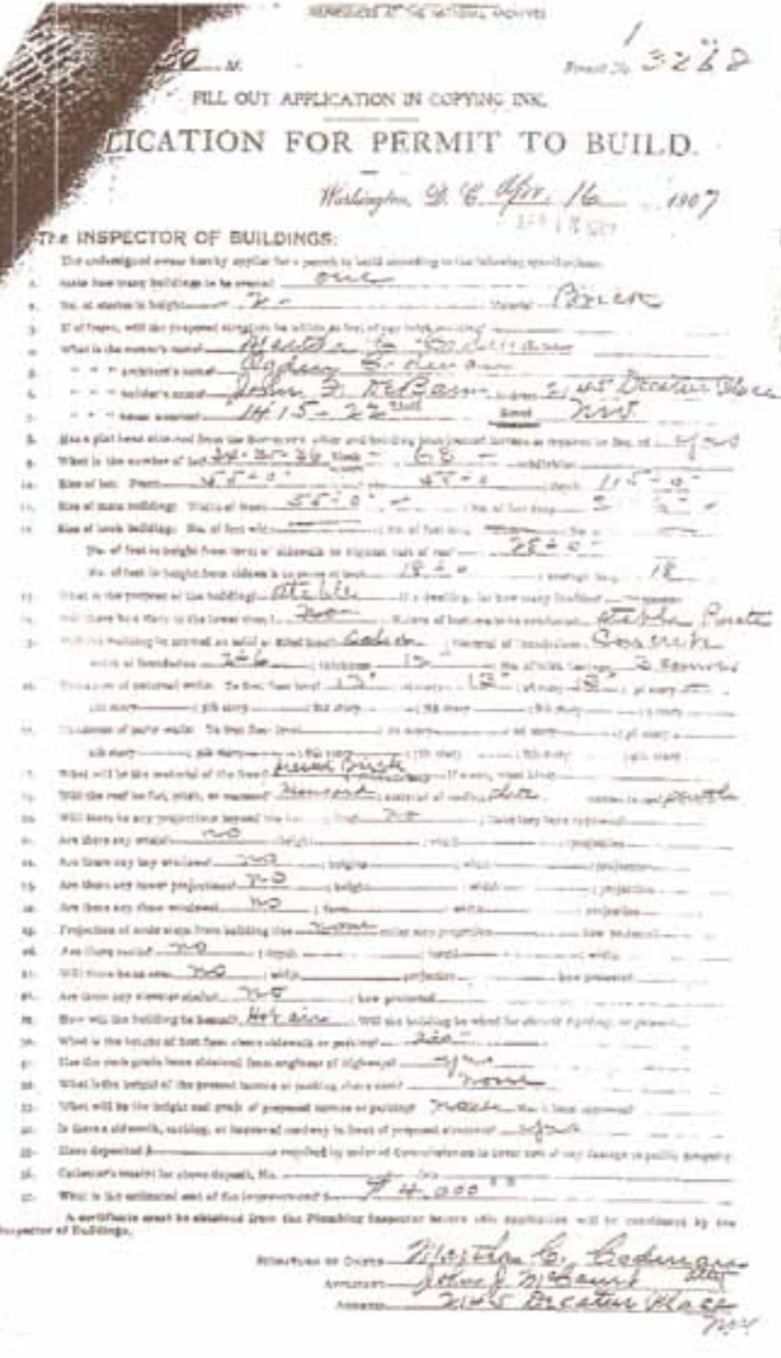
Building permit #3268 for the stable.

The following year Karolik commissioned Codman Jr. to design a two-story, brick and stucco carriage house and stable at 1415 22nd Street NW, a few blocks south of her home.

On April 17, 1907, two permits were filed to construct the building. Permit #3267 was filed to build the carriage house at an estimated cost of $15,000, and permit #3268 was filed to build the adjoining stable, estimated to cost $4,000. John F. DeBaun, a builder from New York who oversaw the construction of Karolik's house, was hired for the project. Despite the carriage house and stable being constructed simultaneously, they were two separate buildings designed to give the impression of being one large building. The carriage house, which fronted 22nd Street, was the larger of the two. The rear portion housed the stables. The property included a telephone that was directly connected to the house.

In addition to housing Codman's carriages, the front building also included living space. Codman's coachman and later chauffeur, John J. Conner, lived in the building with his wife Sophie from 1910 to the mid-1930s. Her butler, Thomas King, also lived there with his wife, Anna, and their children Charlotte and Julia.

As the popularity of automobile ownership increased, Codman no longer needed a carriage house and stable. To convert the buildings into a garage, city regulations required her to have approval from at least 75% of the property owners that were within 200 feet (61 m) of the property. She collected the signatures, and on December 19, 1917, a permit was issued to being the renovations. The doors of the carriage house were replaced to accommodate an automobile. The new garage still had living space included in the layout. Conner and his wife moved out of the building in 1936.

Codman had entertained in her Washington, D.C. house for many years during the winter season. In 1928 she married the Russian opera singer Maxim Karolik, who was 30 years younger. After that, she rarely spent time in Washington, D.C., as the couple lived mostly in Europe and Newport. Codman Karolik sold the house in 1938 and sold the garage two years later.

=== Commercial use ===
In 1940, new owner Benzalim Coran hired Renato Corte to design a one-story rear brick addition that was built by L.F. Collier. The estimated cost for the project was $2,000. The property was converted into commercial space and rented to various tenants for the next decade. A newspaper advertisement in 1941 listed the property as 8,600 square feet (799 sq m), and available to rent for $500 a month. An ad in 1949 marketed the property as a possible headquarters for a national organization, automobile showroom, or store space. It said the space included a garage for six vehicles, around twelve offices on the second floor, and an open floor plan on the first floor.

The following year a Goodyear service store moved from Connecticut Avenue and N Street into the property. The business remained there until the 1970s, during which time a one-story concrete addition was built onto the front of the store. By 1976 the property was home to the Last Hurrah (also known as the Last Hurrah Supper Club), a heterosexual nightclub that was also popular with the local gay community. In 1981 the owners of the property attempted to have the building demolished and replaced with a residential building. The local Advisory Neighborhood Commission supported the plan, but the project was later cancelled. That same year a restaurant called the African Room opened in the rear portion of the building, facing Twining Court.

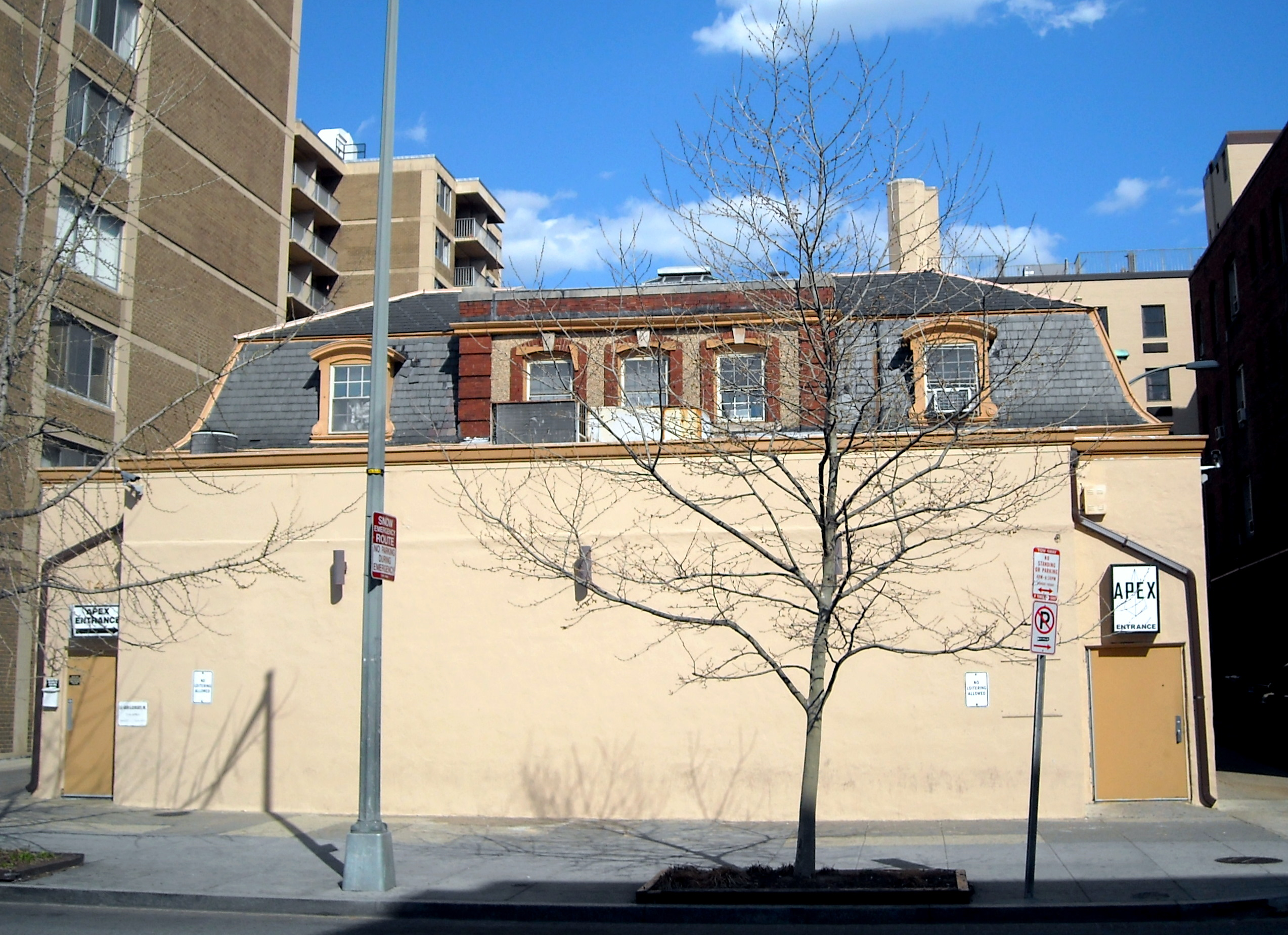
The building in 2009 when it housed the Apex nightclub.

The Last Hurrah continued operating until 1983 when Glen Thompson opened Badlands, a gay bar, later that year. Thompson had previously opened a gay bar in 1976, the Fraternity House, in the former Spencer Carriage House and Stable that shared the alley with Badlands. The area surrounding Badlands was also home to gay bar, Mr. P's, that had opened at 2147 P Street NW in 1976.

Soon after Badlands opened in May 1983, its practice of carding (asking for several forms of identification) African Americans or telling them the bar was full to prevent them from entering resulted in protests. Local activists filed complaints with the city's Commission on Human Rights, and Badlands management paid a settlement of $5,000. The bar became one of the most popular gay clubs in Washington, D.C., and remained open for 28 years. It was renamed Apex in 2002 and closed unexpectedly in 2011 when the property owner sold the building. After Apex closed, local businessman Allen Carroll purchased the building and opened a second location of the Capitol Hill lesbian bar, Phase 1, in February 2012. Phase One of Dupont never attracted large crowds, and the bar closed the following year.

While the building was still operating as Badlands, local historic preservationists with the Dupont Circle Citizens Association, Dupont Circle Conservancy, and DC Preservation League submitted an application to have the building designated a historic landmark, citing its significance as a surviving carriage house and stable, along with its connection to Codman and her architect cousin, Codman Jr. The building was added to the District of Columbia Inventory of Historic Sites as the Codman Carriage House and Stable on December 19, 1995.

When the Dupont Circle Historic District boundary was expanded in 2005, the building was one of 70 contributing properties, including designated historic landmarks, that were added to the historic district. The other landmarks were The Cairo, Spencer Carriage House and Stable, Walsh Stable, 2225 N Street Apartment Building, and Embassy Gulf Service Station, which is sited across the street. The building is one of 101 alley structures in the historic district.

In 2015 the building was sold to Rock Creek Property Group for $2.75 million. The following year the company announced an extensive restoration and renovation process would begin to transform the building into office space: "Our goal with this property is to bring it back to life. After years of neglect, the original grandeur of the architecture was lost." OTJ Architects and Eichberg Construction were hired for the project.

Due to the building's historic landmark status and location in proximity to Rock Creek Park, the renovations had to be approved by the United States Commission of Fine Arts and city's Historic Preservation Review Board. The project, which included adding a roof deck and skylights, window and facade restoration, and replication of the original carriage house doors, was completed in 2018.

== Building ==
=== Architect ===
Ogden Codman Jr. (1863–1951) was a successful architect and interior designer from New England. A few years before designing his cousin Martha Codman's buildings, Codman Jr. married wealthy widow Leila Griswold Webb. He was gay. His wife died a few years after their marriage, and Codman Jr. inherited a large sum of money. He continued his work until moving to France in 1920, where he later retired.

Although he had success as an architect, Codman Jr. is most known for his interior decorating skills. His notable clients included Edith Wharton, who coauthored with Codman Jr. the interior design manual The Decoration of Houses. Another was John D. Rockefeller Jr., who hired Codman Jr. to design the interiors of his Kykuit mansion. Codman Jr. was also hired by members of the Vanderbilt family. He decorated more than a dozen rooms at Cornelius Vanderbilt II's mansion in Newport, Rhode Island, The Breakers, and rooms at Frederick William Vanderbilt's mansion in New York.

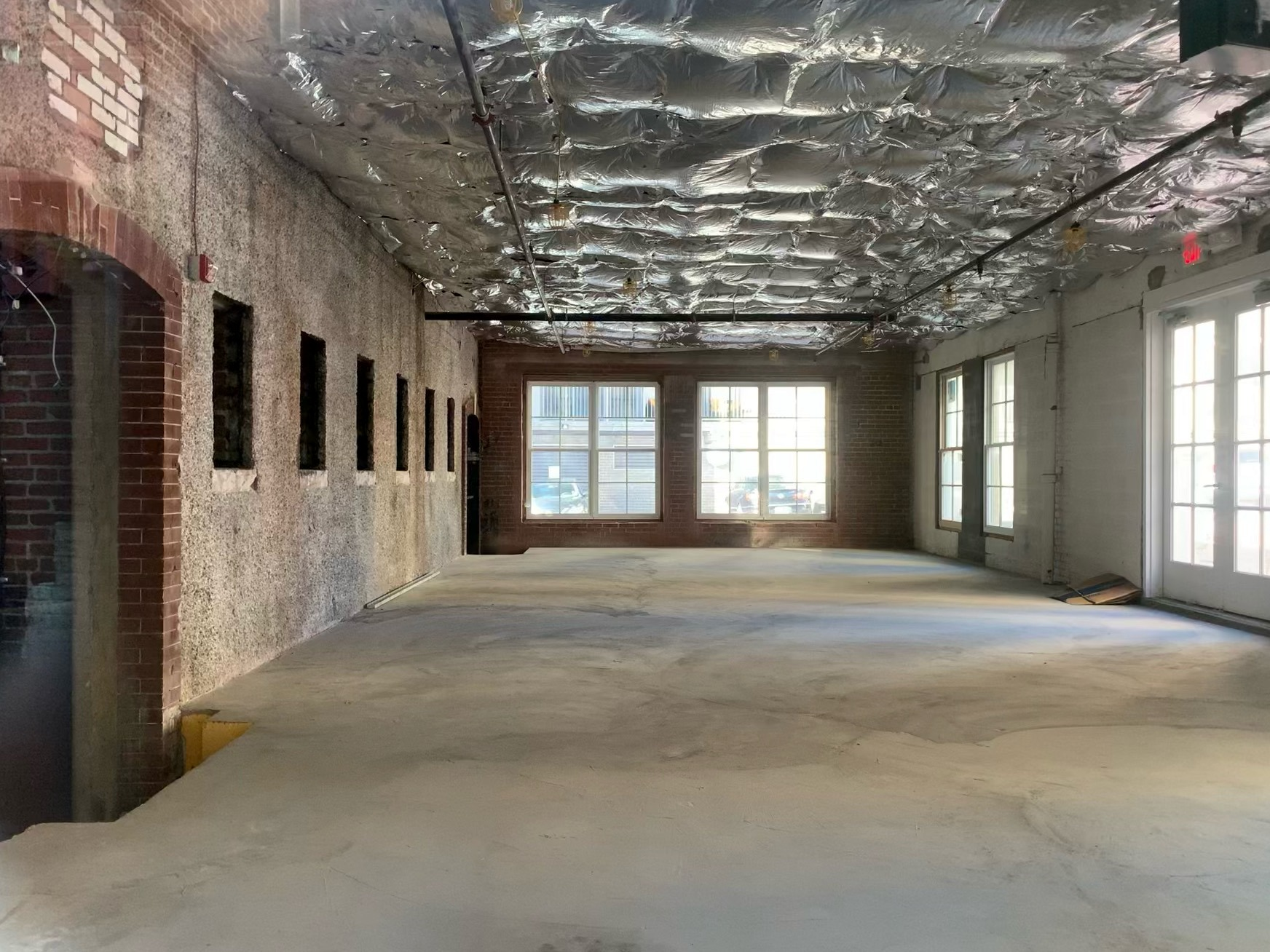
The 1940 addition on the east side of the building. The original wall of the stable is on the left.

=== Location and design ===
The Codman Carriage House and Stable is sited on Square 68, Lot 34-36, fronting 22nd Street NW in Dupont Circle. There is a small alley on the south face of the building. The north and east faces are on Twining Court, an alley located between 21st Street, 22nd Street, O Street, and P Street NW. The lots' proximity and easy access to Rock Creek Park and Dupont Circle were integral to Codman's choosing this site for the support building.

The 9,604 square foot (892 sq m) building is an example of Second Empire architecture and features a mansard roof. At the time the carriage house and stable were constructed, 2,200 city residents owned automobiles. Codman Jr. may have chosen the Second Empire style, which was considered dated at the time, rather than the Classical Revival style of Codman's residence, reflect the more traditional use of the building.

The original portion of the building has a concrete foundation, and the walls are made of brick and stucco. The one-story west addition is made of concrete, and the one-story east addition is made of brick and concrete. The original portion measures 115 feet by 55 feet (47.2 m by 16.8 m) and includes a second floor. The central portion and west end originally housed the carriage house and the east end housed the stable. The central portion features three bays and a window on each side of the pedimented carriage entry. Above this are two dormer windows on each side of a circular window. The east and west ends of the original portion extend from the central portion. They feature windows on the first floor and dormer windows on the second floors.

== Notes ==
1. The ad says, "U.S. Government vacates July 1", but it is unclear which government agency rented the building.
2. The Goodyear store was there until at least 1973 because a help wanted ad was placed in August of that year.
3. Some sources list the opening year as 1984, but there are articles in The Washington Post discussing Badlands in 1983.
