= Karolik =

Karolik is a given name and surname. Notable people with the surname include:

- Dzyanis Karolik (born 1979), Belarusian footballer
- Martha Codman Karolik (1858–1948), American philanthropist and art collector
- Maxim Karolik (1893–1963), American opera singer

== See also ==
- Lyudmila Korolik (born 1975), Belarusian cross-country skier
