= Georgine =

Georgine may refer to:

- Georgine (name), a feminine given name
- Georgine (brand), an American women's fashion brand
