= Georgine (name) =

Georgine is a feminine given name. Notable people with the name include:

- Georgine Gerhard (1886–1971), Swiss teacher
- Georgine Darcy (1930–2004), American dancer
- Georgine Milmine (1871–1950), Canadian-American journalist
- Georgine von Januschofsky (1849–1914), Moravian actress
- Georgine Kellermann (b. 1957) German journalist
- Georgine Campbell (1861–1931), American painter
- Georgine von Milinkovič (1913–1986), Croatian operatic mezzo-soprano
- Georgine Loacker (1926–2013), American scholar
- Georgine Anderson (1928–2024), British actress

== See also ==
- Jørgine
