= Izetta (name) =

Izetta is a female given name. Notable people with the name include:

- Izetta Jewel (1883–1978), American actress, suffragist, and political candidate
- Izetta Roberts Cooper (born 1929), Liberian librarian and writer
- Izetta Sombo Wesley, head of the Liberia Football Association
