= Embassy of Thailand, Washington, D.C. =

Royal Thai Embassy, Washington, D.C.
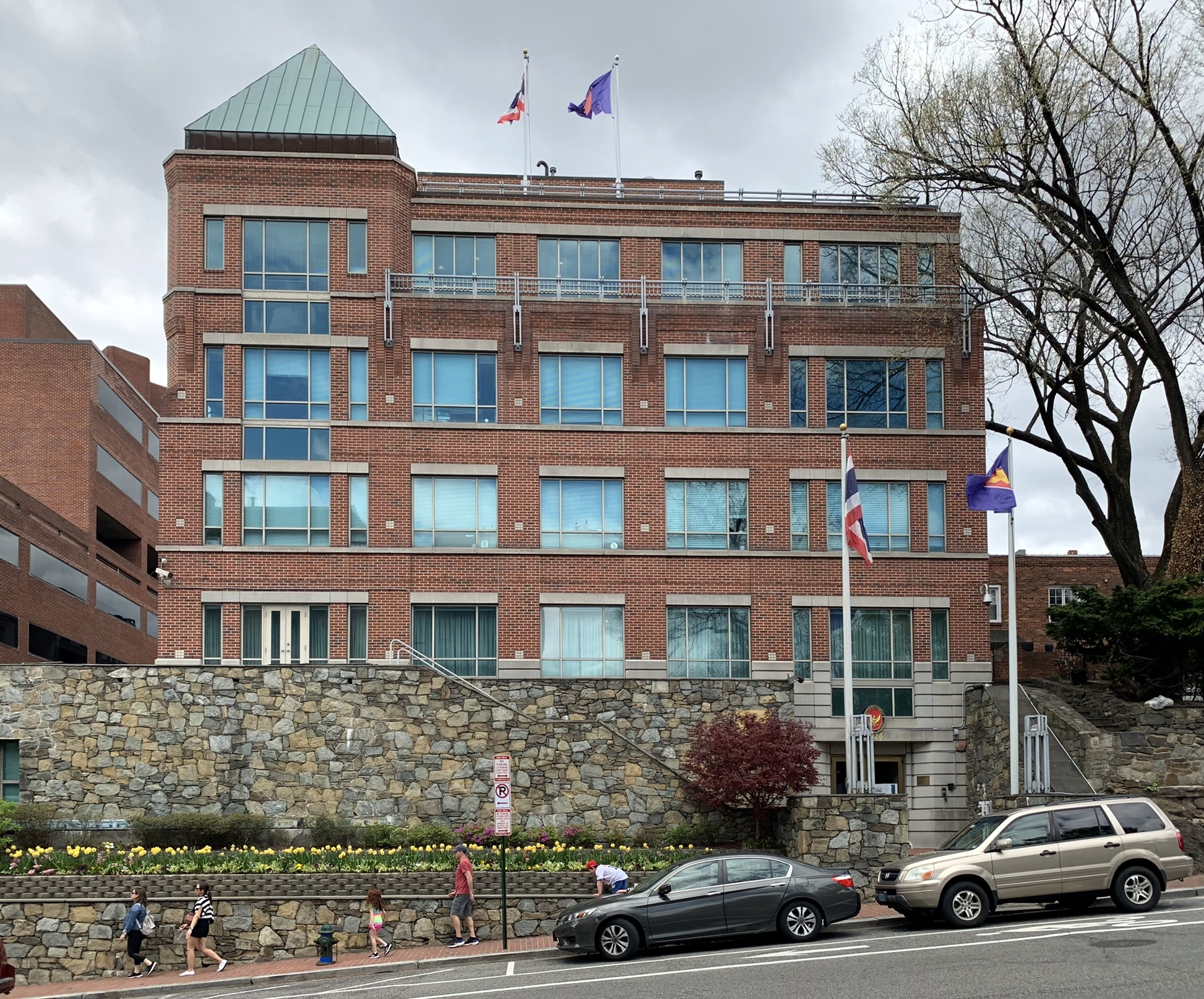
- Location: Washington, D.C.
- Address: 1024 Wisconsin Avenue, N.W.
- Coordinates: 38°54′12″N 77°3′47″W
- Ambassador: Suriya Chindawongse
- Website: https://washingtondc.thaiembassy.org/en/index

The Royal Thai Embassy in Washington, D.C. (Thai: สถานเอกอัครราชทูตไทย ณ กรุงวอชิงตัน ดีซี) is the diplomatic mission of the Kingdom of Thailand to the United States. The embassy is located at 1024 Wisconsin Avenue, Northwest, Washington, D.C. in the Georgetown neighborhood.

In 2024, Suriya Chindawongse was named ambassador to the United States.

== See also ==
- Thailand–United States relations
- Embassy of the United States, Bangkok
- Codman–Davis House, the ambassador's residence
