= Kyra E. Hicks =

American art historian (born 1965)

- Born: October 1, 1965 (age 61); Los Angeles, California, U.S.
- Education: Howard University; University of Michigan
- Writing career
- Subject: History of quilting
- Website: black-threads.com

Kyra E. Hicks (born October 1, 1965) is an American author, quilter and art historian. She writes about African-American quilt history and encourages quilt documentation. She has also created story quilts, including Black Barbie, which is in the permanent collection of the Fenimore Art Museum in New York.

== Education ==
Kyra Hicks graduated from Howard University and the University of Michigan. She works professionally as an e-commerce and marketing director. She lives in Arlington, Virginia.

== Quilting ==
Hicks specializes in creating narrative or story quilts. The themes include being single black womanhood, politics, family, and religion. All of her quilts include words as well as designs.

Her Patriotic Quilt (1995) is in the permanent collection of the Museum of Arts and Design in New York. It includes the names of prominent American black women Lani Guinier, Joycelyn Elders, and Anita Hill.

Hicks' Black Barbie quilt was displayed in the Fenimore Art Museum's exhibition Through the Eyes of Others: African Americans and Identity in American Art (2010). She addresses issues of body image, the societal obsession with beauty, and the neglect of African American children when creating toys and other ephemera. The illustration features the American Barbie doll depicted as a black woman, with the text "Barbie" above it, and below it the phrase: "Was never intended for me."

== Research ==
In her quilt history research, Hicks found the second known photograph to exist of Harriet Powers, an enslaved African-American folk artist and quilt maker from rural Georgia. Powers used traditional appliqué techniques to record local legends, Bible stories, and astronomical events on her quilts. Two of her quilts have survived: Bible Quilt (1886) and Pictorial Quilt (1898).

Hicks has confirmed the price of Pictorial Quilt, paid by owner Maxim Karolik. After acquiring it, he donated the quilt to the Museum of Fine Arts, Boston.

Hicks was one of four African-American women quilters profiled in a PhD dissertation by Yolanda Woods, New World African Conjurers Who Edify and Heal the Community.

== Publications ==
- "Sonia Boyce" in St. James Guide to Black Artists edited by Thomas Riggs (1997)
- Black Threads: An African American Quilting Sourcebook (2003)
- Martha Ann’s Quilt for Queen Victoria (2007)
- "Black Women Have Always Quilted" in The Quilt: A History and Celebration of an American Art Form edited by Elise Schebler Roberts (2007)
- Liberia: A Visit Through Books (2008, co-author with Izetta Roberts Cooper)
- This I Accomplish: Harriet Powers’ Bible Quilt and Other Pieces (2009)
- 1.6 Million African American Quilters: Survey, Sites, and a Half-Dozen Art Quilt Blocks (2010)
- The Lord’s Supper Pattern Book: Imagining Harriet Powers’ Lost Bible Story Quilt (2011)
- The Return of the Guinea Fowl: An Autobiographical Novel of a Liberian Doctor (2011, co-author with Henry Nehemiah Cooper)
- How to Self-Publish Your Own Quilt Catalog: A Workbook for Quilters, Guilds, Galleries and Textile Artists (2012)
- Franklin Roosevelt’s Postage Stamp Quilt: The Story of Estella Weaver Nukes’ Presidential Gift (2012)
