= Expulsion from the Garden of Eden (Cole) =

Painting by Thomas Cole

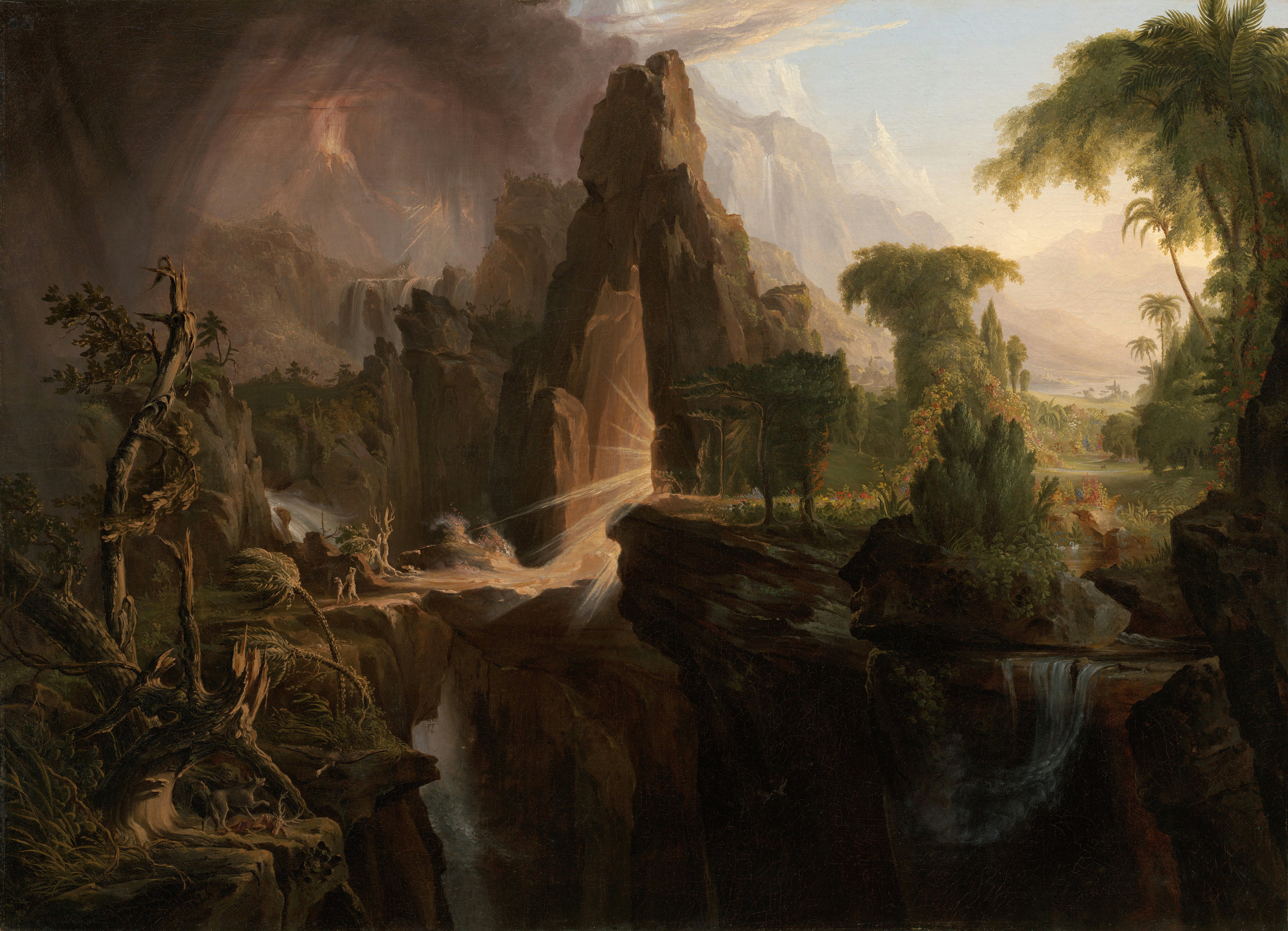
- Artist: Thomas Cole
- Year: 1828
- Medium: Oil on canvas
- Dimensions: 100.96 cm × 138.43 cm (39.75 in × 54.50 in)
- Location: Museum of Fine Arts, Boston; Massachusetts
- Accession: 47.1188

Expulsion from the Garden of Eden (or Expulsion from Paradise) was painted in 1828 by English-born American painter Thomas Cole. It belongs to the collection of the Museum of Fine Arts, Boston and is on display in their Waleska Evans James Gallery (Gallery 236). This landscape painting exemplifies the style of the Hudson River School, a group of American landscape painters that Thomas Cole is credited with founding. On the lower left part of the cliff, Cole signed his name as "T Cole".

== Painting ==
The title of the painting, Expulsion from the Garden of Eden, refers to the story of Adam and Eve's expulsion from Eden in the Book of Genesis, which is the founding narrative for Christian explanations of sin and evil.

Traditionally, representations of the event usually have Adam and Eve as the focal point, with their despair at their expulsion conveyed through their figures. However, as an artist of the Hudson River School, Cole emphasized the landscape rather than the figures. Dwarfed by the landscape, Adam and Eve have minimal detail. While their posture and expression indicate their disgrace in conventional terms (they cover their faces, and Eve as the more guilty party leads the way), Cole seeks to convey their despair primarily through the landscape.

Consistent with a more or less dualistic vision of good and evil espoused by many strains of Christianity, the composition is divided exactly in half. On the viewer's right is Paradise, from which Adam and Eve are forcibly thrust by a bright ray of light, which likely symbolizes God. Paradise emanates radiance and is a source of light and joy in the universe. It is vibrant, full of life with lush wildlife, and blue skies.

On the left side of the picture, the outside world is portrayed as the opposite of Paradise. It is dark and ominous, as hinted in the decaying trees, volcano in the background, and the wolf devouring a deer in the bottom left corner, as a vulture flies by, hoping to scavenge some of the carcass.

== Provenance ==
Upon its completion in 1828, Expulsion from the Garden of Eden was first exhibited to the public later that year with his Garden of Eden (Amon Carter Museum). They were exhibited together at the National Academy Museum and School, which was then known as the National Academy of Design in New York. Cole was a founding member of the National Academy and exhibited his works there in the hopes of selling them or garnering commissions.

In 1829, Expulsion from the Garden of Eden was bought by the prominent doctor David Hosack, who is known as the doctor that tended to Alexander Hamilton after his fatal duel. In addition to medicine, Hosack was a patron of the arts. He was a member of the American Academy of the Fine Arts and promoted the works of Samuel Morse and Cole through purchasing their works for his own personal collection. Upon Hosack's death in 1835, Expulsion from the Garden of Eden was left to his third wife, Magdalena Coster. When Coster died in 1846, John Kearney Rodgers, the husband of Hosack's youngest daughter, Emily Hosack, inherited the painting.

Eventually, in 1849, the painting was bought by James Lenox, a famed collector of paintings and books. Lenox exhibited the painting in the art gallery of his Lenox Library. Although he died in 1890, the painting remained on display in the Lenox Library, as listed in the 1892 gallery guide. However, the Lenox Library was facing financial difficulties, so in 1895, the painting along with other art of the Lenox Library was consolidated with the Astor Library and Tilden Trust to form the collection of the newly created New York Public Library (NYPL). In 1943, the NYPL sold the painting to raise money. It was auctioned at Parke-Bernet Galleries on April 16, 1943. The painting was bought by Arnold Seligmann, Rey, & Co., a New York art dealership.

Maxim Karolik, an art collector, acquired the painting later that year. His wife, Martha Catherine Codman Karolik, donated the painting to the Museum of Fine Arts in Boston. The MFA officially acquired the painting on June 12, 1947. It has been in their collection ever since and can be seen on display in their galleries.

== See also ==
- List of paintings by Thomas Cole
