= Spencer Carriage House and Stable =

- U.S. National Register of Historic Places
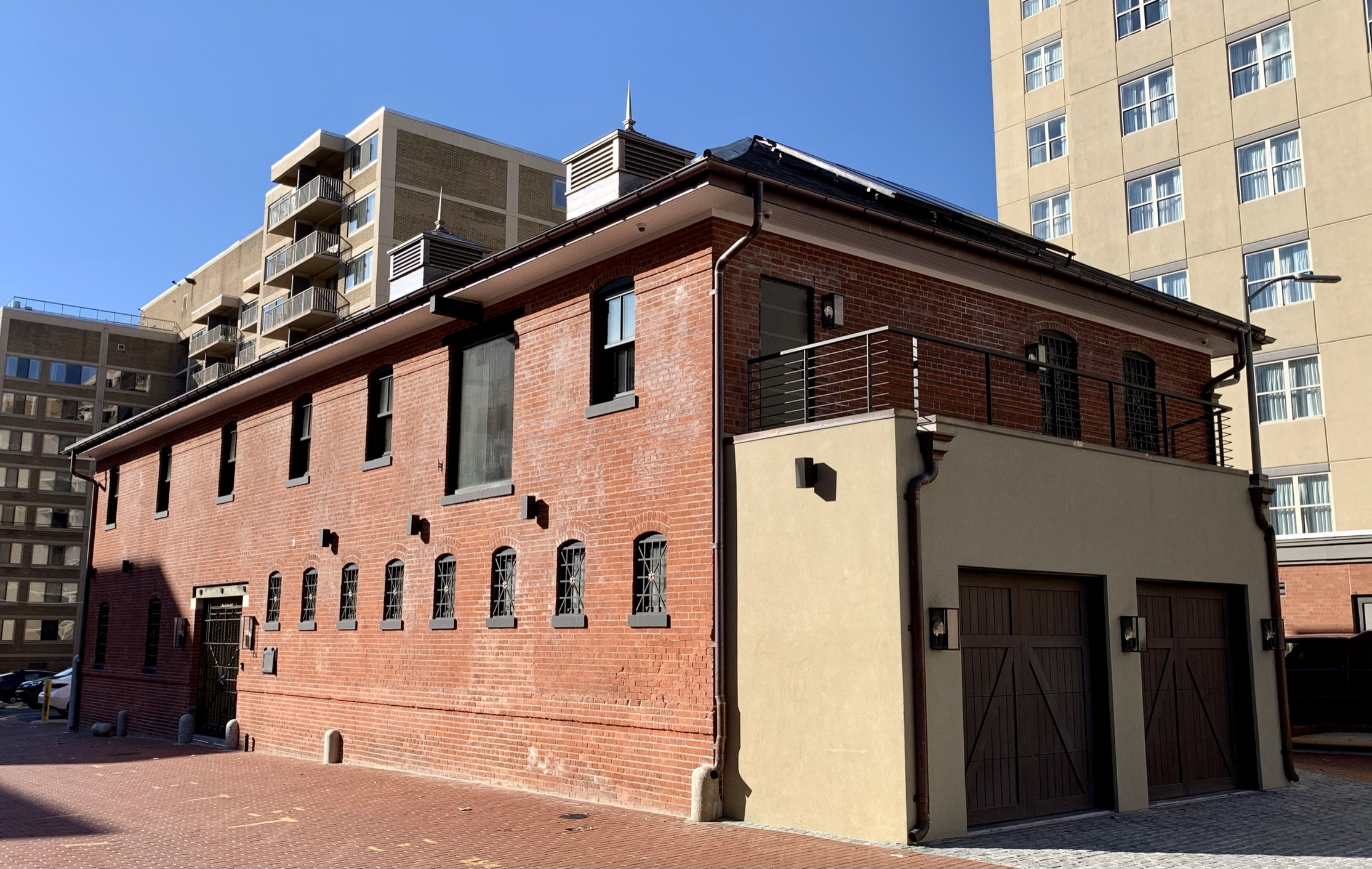
- Spencer Carriage House and Stable in 2020

- Location within Washington, D.C.
- Location: 2123 Twining Court, NW; Washington, D.C.
- Coordinates: 38°54′33″N 77°2′53″W
- Built: 1905
- Architectural style: Colonial Revival
- NRHP reference No.: 96000894
- Added to NRHP: August 29, 1996

Spencer Carriage House and Stable is an historic structure located in the Dupont Circle neighborhood of Washington, D.C.

== History ==
The building is the work of master builder John McGregor and was completed in 1905. It was built to service the residence of Southern Railway president Samuel Spencer. The two-story structure features modest brick detailing, a hipped roof, and cupolas. The building has housed a nightclub and is now a private residence. It has been listed on the District of Columbia Inventory of Historic Sites since 1995 and it was listed on the National Register of Historic Places in 1996. It is a contributing property in the Dupont Circle Historic District.

== See also ==
- Codman Carriage House and Stable
- Walsh Stable
