= Walsh Stable =

- U.S. National Register of Historic Places
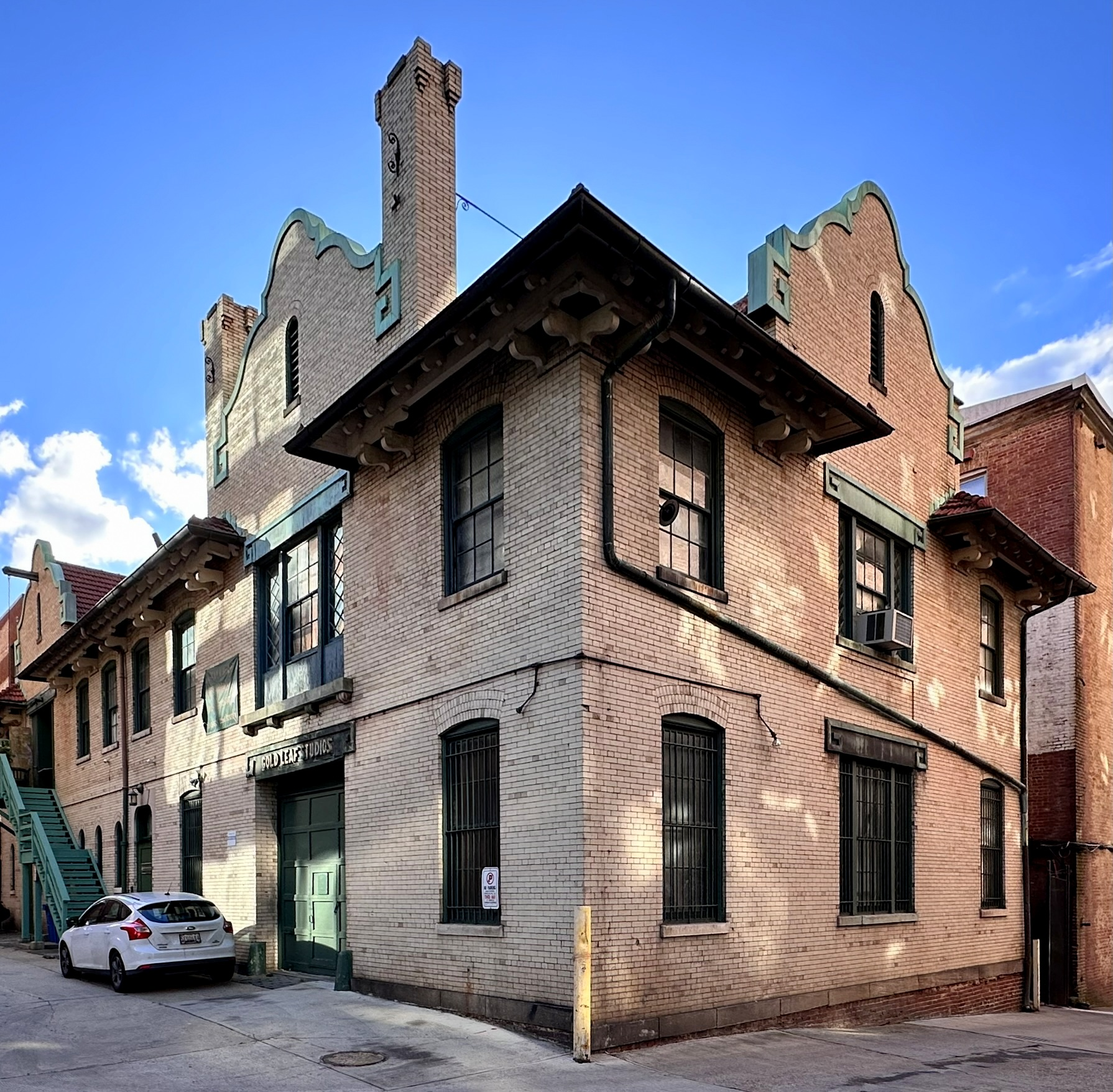
- Walsh Stable in 2023

- Location within Central Washington, D.C. Location within the District of Columbia Location within the United States
- Location: Washington, D.C.
- Coordinates: 38°54′36″N 77°2′54″W
- Area: 0.1 acres (0.040 ha)
- Built: 1903
- Architect: Lemuel Norris
- NRHP reference No.: 86002932
- Added to NRHP: November 6, 1986

The Walsh Stable is a historic building located at 1523 22nd Street, NW in the Dupont Circle neighborhood of Washington, D.C. It was designed by architect Lemuel Norris in 1903 and added to the National Register of Historic Places in 1986.

== See also ==
- Codman Carriage House and Stable
- Spencer Carriage House and Stable
