= Cherdchai Chaivaivid =

Thai diplomat

- เชิดชาย ใช้ไววิทย์

Thai Ambassador to the United Nations
- Incumbent
- Assumed office June 2024
- Monarch: Vajiralongkorn
- Prime Minister: Srettha Thavisin; Paetongtarn Shinawatra; Suriya Juangroongruangkit (acting); Phumtham Wechayachai (acting); Anutin Charnvirakul
- Preceded by: Suriya Chindawongse

Personal details
- Education: Chulalongkorn University (BA); University of Kent (MA)

Cherdchai Chaivaivid (Thai: เชิดชาย ใช้ไววิทย์) is a Thai diplomat who is currently the Thai Ambassador to the United Nations. Cherdchai presented his credentials to Secretary-General António Guterres on June 7, 2024. Cherdchai previously served as the director-general of the Department of International Economic Affairs at the Thai Ministry of Foreign Affairs.
