= Codman–Davis House =

Historic house in Washington, D.C., United States

- U.S. National Register of Historic Places
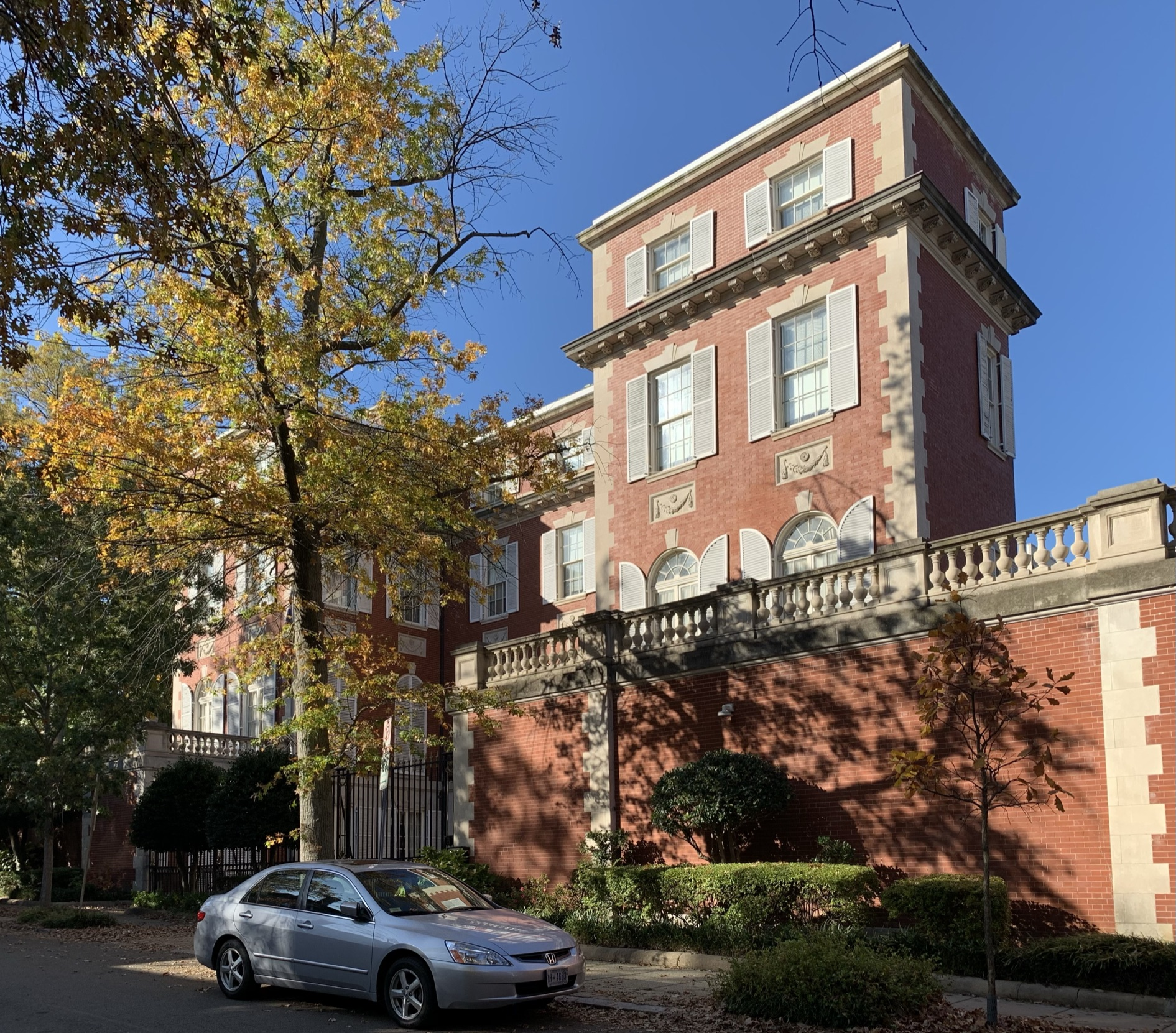

- Location within Washington, D.C.
- Location: Washington, D.C.
- Coordinates: 38°54′49″N 77°2′54″W
- Built: 1906
- Architect: Ogden Codman Jr.
- Architectural style: Classical Revival
- NRHP reference No.: 79003100
- Added to NRHP: October 11, 1979

The Codman–Davis House is a four-story, red brick, 1906, classical revival house in Washington, D.C. at 2145 Decatur Place NW (in the Kalorama neighborhood). It was designed by Ogden Codman Jr. for his cousin, Martha Codman of Washington, D.C. and Newport, Rhode Island. She also commissioned his design of the Codman Carriage House and Stable, built nearby.

It is listed on the National Register of Historic Places. In 1995 the house served as the residence of the Thai ambassador.

== See also ==
- Codman Carriage House and Stable
