= Tanee Sangrat =

Thai diplomat

- ธานี แสงรัตน์
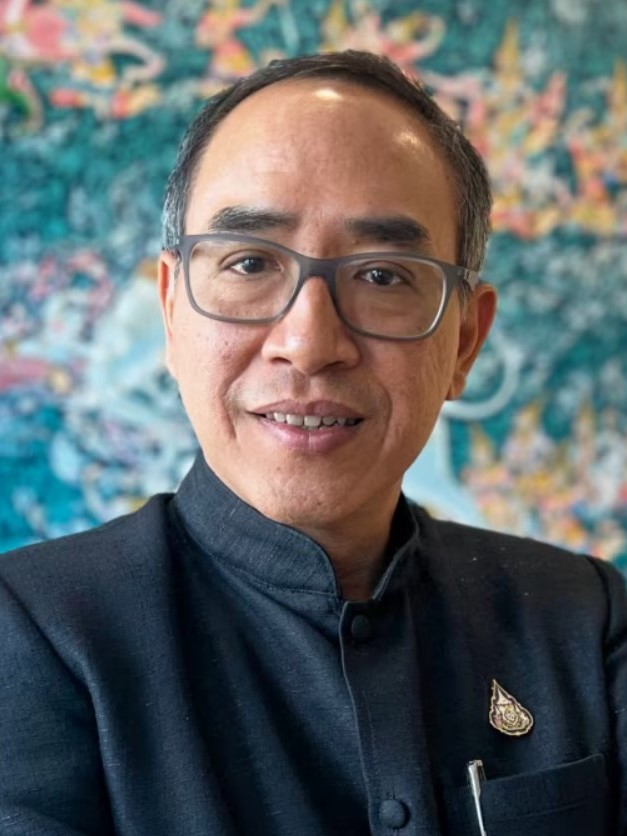

Thai Ambassador to South Korea
- Incumbent
- Assumed office 21 April 2024
- Monarch: Vajiralongkorn
- Prime Minister: Paetongtarn Shinawatra; Anutin Charnvirakul

Thai Ambassador to the United States
- In office November 2022 – April 2024
- Monarch: Vajiralongkorn
- Prime Minister: Prayut Chan-o-cha; Srettha Thavisin
- Preceded by: Manasvi Srisodapol
- Succeeded by: Suriya Chindawongse

Personal details
- Education: Southern Illinois University (BA); University of Pittsburgh (MA)

Tanee Sangrat (Thai: ธานี แสงรัตน์) is a Thai diplomat and the current Thai Ambassador to South Korea. Sangrat previously served as Thai Ambassador to the United States from 2022 to 2024. Prior to his appointment, Tanee served as the Thai Ministry of Foreign Affairs spokesperson and director general of the Information Department from 2020 to 2022.
