= Vitavas Srivihok =

Thai diplomat

- วิทวัส ศรีวิหค

Thai Ambassador to the United Nations
- In office 2018–2021
- Monarch: Vajiralongkorn
- Prime Minister: Prayut Chan-o-cha
- Preceded by: Virachai Plasai
- Succeeded by: Suriya Chindawongse

Personal details
- Education: Chulalongkorn University (BA); University of Mississippi (MA)

Vitavas Srivihok (Thai: วิทวัส ศรีวิหค) is a Thai diplomat who served as the Thai Ambassador to the United Nations from 2018 to 2021. Vitavas presented his credentials to UN Secretary‑General António Guterres on May 21, 2018. Vitavas was previous deputy permanent representative at Thailand's Permanent Mission to the United Nations from 2015 to 2018, the Thai Ambassador to the Czech Republic from 2012 and 2015, and to Thai Ambassador to Laos from 2010 to 2012.
