= Permanent Representative of Thailand to the United Nations =

Ambassador and Permanent Representative of Thailand to the United Nations
- Incumbent; Cherdchai Chaivaivid since June 2024
- Thai Mission to the United Nations

The Ambassador and Permanent Representative of Thailand to the United Nations is the highest ranking representative of the Royal Thai Government and head of the delegation of Thailand to the Permanent Mission of Thailand to the United Nations in New York.

== List of ambassadors ==
Diplomatic accreditation	Term end	Ambassador	Thai name	List of prime ministers of Thailand	Note
1947	1957	Prince Wan Waithayakon	ศาสตราจารย์ พลตรี พระเจ้าวรวงศ์เธอ กรมหมื่นนราธิปพงศ์ประพันธ์	Plaek Phibunsongkhram Pote Sarasin Thanom Kittikachorn	Also served concurrently as Thailand's Ambassador to the United States and President of the United Nations General Assembly (1956–1957), being only Thai to have received such an honor; Deputy Prime Minister of Thailand (1 January 1958- 20 October 1958) - Minister of Foreign Affairs (1952-1958)
1964	1976	Anand Panyarachun	อานันท์ ปันยารชุน	Thanom Kittikachorn Sanya Dharmasakti Mom Rajawongse Seni Pramoj Mom Rajawongse Kukrit Pramoj	18th Prime Minister of Thailand
February 14, 1996	2001	Asda Jayanama	อัษฎา ชัยนาม	Chavalit Yongchaiyudh Chuan Leekpai	
October 23, 2001	2004	Chuchai Kasemsarn	ชูชัย เกษมศานติ์	Thaksin Shinawatra	
January 16, 2004	2007	Laxanachantorn Laohaphan	ลักษณาจันทร เลาหพันธุ์	Thaksin Shinawatra Sonthi Boonyaratglin	
May 13, 2007	2009	Don Pramudwinai	ดอน ปรมัตถ์วินัย	Surayud Chulanont Samak Sundaravej Somchai Wongsawat Abhisit Vejjajiva	Deputy Prime Minister and Minister of Foreign Affairs of Thailand (2015-2023)
August 5, 2009	2015	Norachit Sinhaseni	นรชิต สิงหเสนี	Abhisit Vejjajiva Yingluck Shinawatra Prayut Chan-o-cha	
March 10, 2015	2018	Virachai Plasai	วีรชัย พลาศรัย	Prayut Chan-o-cha	
May 21, 2018	2021	Vitavas Srivihok	วิทวัส ศรีวิหค	Prayut Chan-o-cha	
December 6, 2021	2024	Suriya Chindawongse	สุริยา จินดาวงษ์	Prayut Chan-o-cha Srettha Thavisin	
June 7, 2024		Cherdchai Chaivaivid	เชิดชาย ใช้ไววิทย์	Srettha Thavisin Paethongthan Shinawatra	
