= Jørgine =

Jørgine is a feminine given name of a Norwegian origin. Notable people with the given name include:

- Jørgine Boomer (1887–1971), Norwegian-American businesswoman and entrepreneur
- Jørgine Anna Sverdrup Krog (1847–1916), Norwegian suffragist
- Jørgine Stene Sørensen (1905–1997), Norwegian chemist

== See also ==
- Georgine (name)
