= John Amory Codman =

American artist

John Amory Codman (1824-1886) was an artist in Boston, Massachusetts, in the 19th century. He was affiliated with the New England Art Union, and kept a studio in Amory Hall in the 1850s.

His wealth came from the Russian and China clipper trade. He married Martha Pickman Rogers (1829-1905) and their only surviving child was Martha Codman Karolik. She was a major benefactor to the arts.

Codman's will was the subject of several sensational court cases. He had left a substantial amount to his mistress, the widow Mrs. Eliza Ann Hales Kimball a.k.a. Violet Kimball, but the bequest was challenged by his wife and daughter. The decision on the first case allowed the bequest to stand but it was appealed and the will was overthrown. After further legal maneuvering, a settlement was reached. Mrs. Kimball received $15,000, rather than the $40,000 and additional considerations specified in the will.

== Image gallery ==
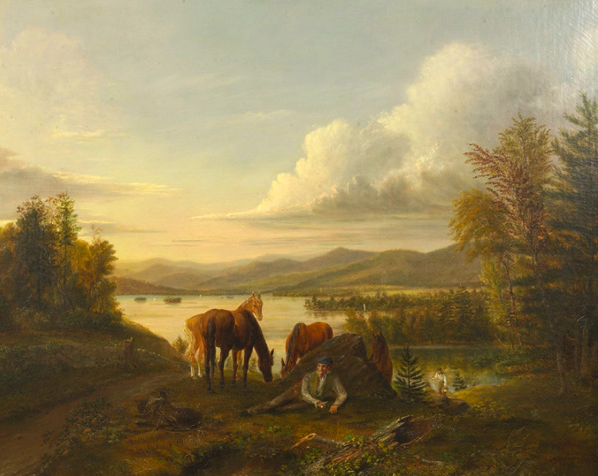
Squam Lake, New Hampshire, by J.A. Codman, 1848

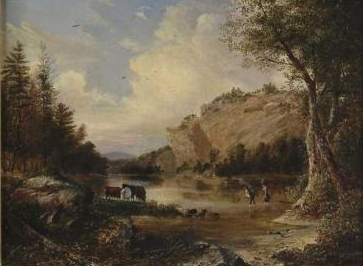
New Hampshire lake scene, 19th century

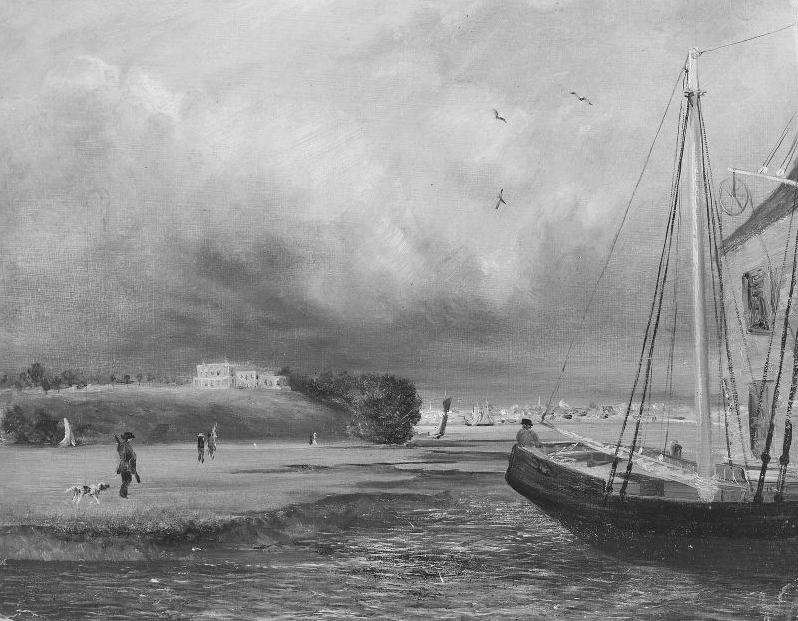
Harbor scene, by J.A. Codman, 1850s (courtesy Museum of Fine Arts, Boston)

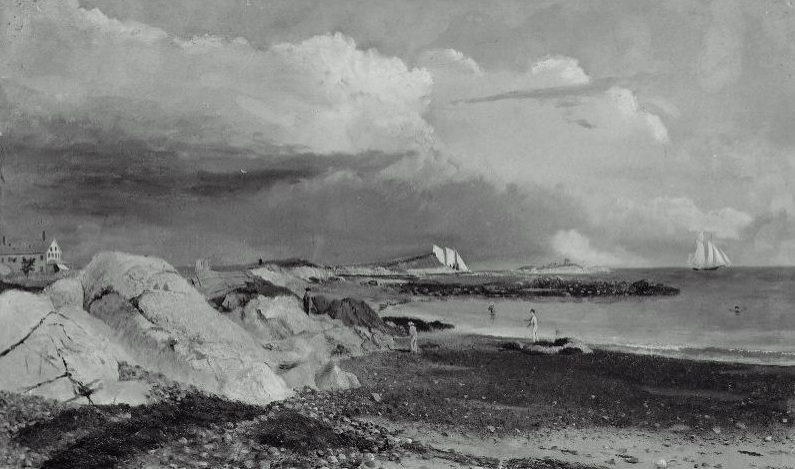
Marblehead Neck and Tinkers Island, Mass., 1850s

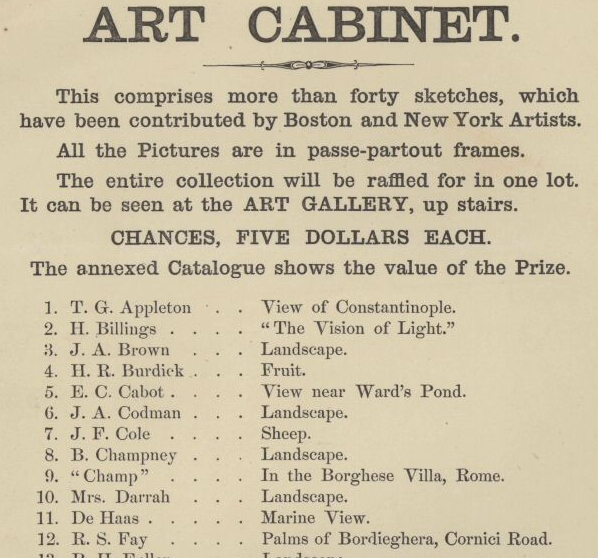
Detail from advertisement for "Art Cabinet" travelling exhibition, including J.A. Codman, 19th century
