= Georgine Campbell =

American painter

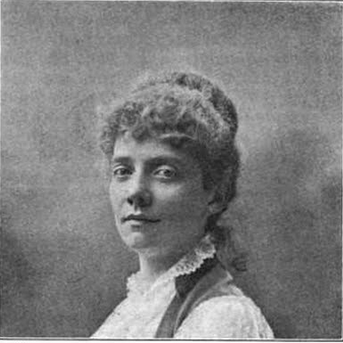
- Born: 1861; New Orleans
- Died: 1931 (aged 69–70)
- Known for: portrait miniatures

Georgine Campbell (1861–1931) was a 19th-century American painter from Louisiana, specializing in miniature portrait painting. Trained in New Orleans and Paris, Campbell had the double distinction of being the first Southern woman who came to New York to make portrait painting a profession, and one who has earned a competency. When the work began to tell on her eyes, she was obliged to limit her time spent on miniatures and alternate it with larger pieces. In the present day, her portraits of Ulysses S. Grant and Henry Morrison Flagler are part of the Smithsonian's collection at the National Portrait Gallery.

== Early years and education ==
Georgine Campbell was born in New Orleans, Louisiana, in 1861. She was a daughter of Dr. George Washington Campbell, a descendant of the Scotch family of that name. Her father was one of the wealthiest and most influential men in the South, where the family lived and had been social leaders all the way back to the times of Osceola and President Jackson.

As a young girl, Campbell first studied with Francois Bernard, who alternated his time between New Orleans and Paris. She was his only pupil. He took her on trial for two months and kept her until she went abroad to study in Paris, under Federico de Madrazo, to whom she attributed much of her success. During her absence, her father's plantations were three times under water, and she returned to find the great estate a swamp. In the midst of this trouble, her father died.

== Career ==
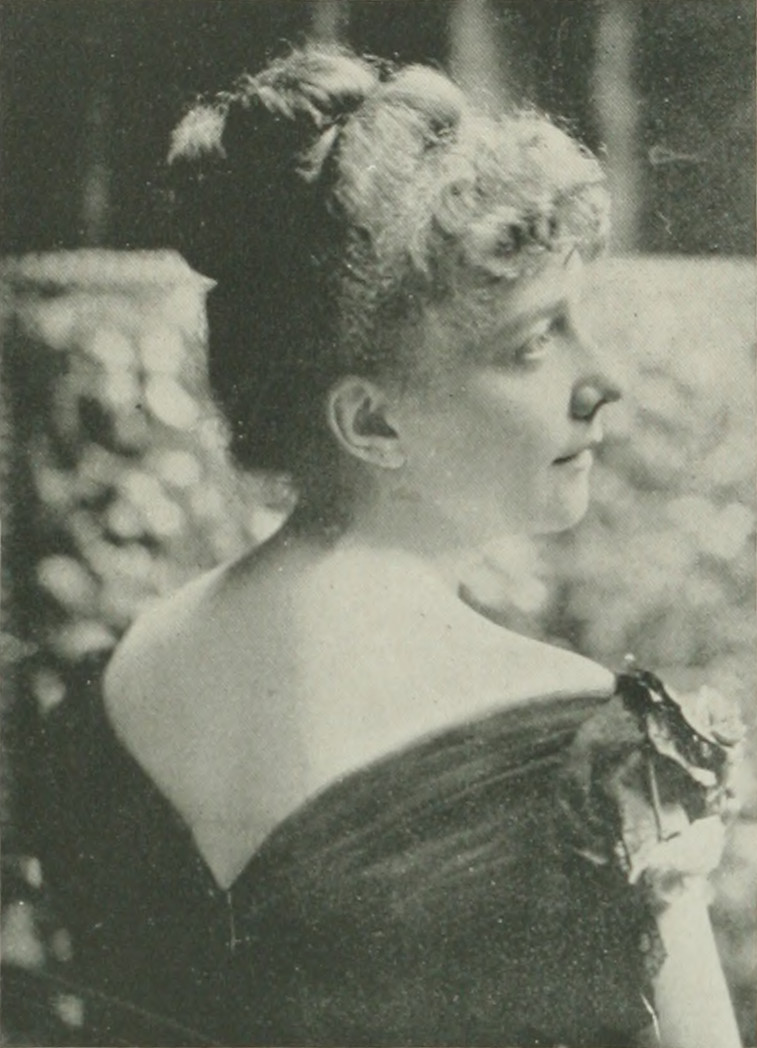
Georgine Campbell

After her father's death, it became necessary for Campbell to support herself, and she turned to her art. Her first orders were from St. Louis after which she decided to come to New York, starting off with a few hundred dollars in her pocket, and three letters of introduction. The people named in the letters all died within the first year, but her income started to grow. She lived in a hotel until she bought a home on Madison Avenue from which the increasing noise drove her away. Campbell then lived with her mother and sister in an apartment overlooking Central Park where she had the space and quiet necessary for her work. Campbell received favorable mention on several occasions when her pictures were exhibited, and in the World's Fair in New Orleans in 1883 and 1884, she received the blue ribbon. When the work began to tell on her eyes, she was obliged to limit her painting in miniature and alternate it with larger pieces. Campbell died in 1931.

== Subjects ==
Though doing a miniature now and then, Campbell at first confined her work largely to oil and pastel, during which period she painted four portraits of Senator Leland Stanford, followed by others of Senators William Morris Stewart, Joseph N. Dolph, George Hearst and Vance, as well as Chief Justice Stephen Johnson Field. and General Ulysses S. Grant. A letter from Colonel Frederick Dent Grant speaks of Campbell's portrait of his father as “an excellent likeness, and one of the best he has seen in oil.” An unsuccessful attempt was made by burglars to steal this valuable painting shortly after it was finished; they had cut it almost entirely from the frame when they were suddenly surprised and fled. In addition to this particular portrait for the family, she made six others: one for the late Senator Stanford, one for the Republican Club of Helena, Montana, and one for a prominent resident of Chicago. Others who sat for her were the two children of Colonel Frederick Dent Grant, whose portraits he took with him to the legation at Vienna; General Grant's wife, Julia Grant; Ida Marie Honoré, and the daughter of General Joseph Lancaster Brent of Baltimore. Additional portraits were painted of Cora Urquhart Brown-Potter, Elizabeth Wharton Drexel and Outerbridge Horsey. Others included Joseph William Drexel and his daughter, Elizabeth Wharton Drexel; a daughter of Mr. William Kissam Vanderbilt; a nephew of Mrs. Cornelius Vanderbilt; Miss Fanny Field; Mary Ball, the mother of Mrs. Washington, taken from a water color in possession of Mrs. Benjamin S. Storey, a great-niece of General Washington; and two children of Jacob Perkins, of Cleveland, Ohio, who are represented taking five o’clock tea on the lawn in front of the house;

General Ulysses S. Grant sat for Campbell. A letter from Colonel Frederick Dent Grant speaks of Campbell's portrait of his father as “an excellent likeness, and one of the best he has seen in oil.” An unsuccessful attempt was made by burglars to steal this valuable painting shortly after it was finished; they had cut it almost entirely from the frame when they were suddenly surprised and fled. In addition to this particular portrait for the family, she made six others: one for the late Senator Stanford, one for the Republican Club of Helena, Montana, and one for a prominent resident of Chicago. Campbell's portraits of Henry Morrison Flagler and General Grant are part of the collection of the Smithsonian's National Portrait Gallery.

== Gallery ==
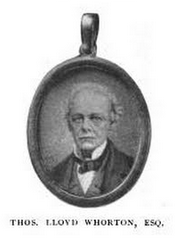
Portrait of Thomas Lloyd Whorton

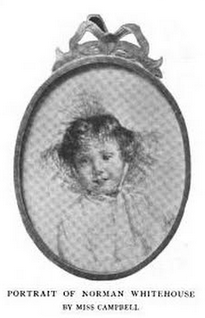
Portrait of Norman Whitehouse

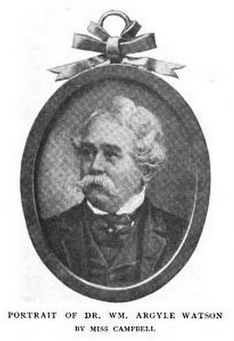
Portrait of Dr. William Argyle Watson

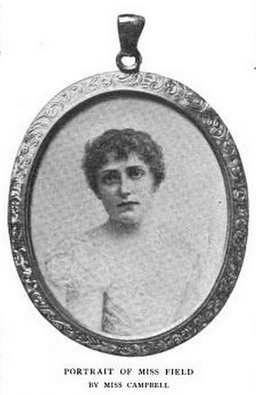
Portrait of Fanny Field

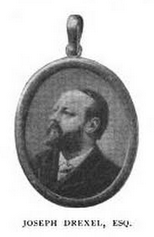
Portrait of Joseph Drexel

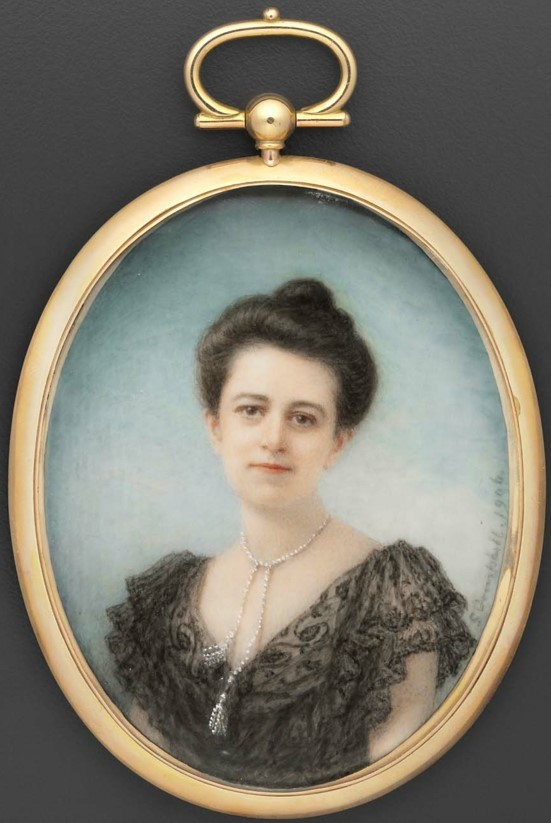
Portrait of Martha Codman Karolik
