= Suriya Chindawongse =

Thai diplomat

- สุริยา จินดาวงษ์
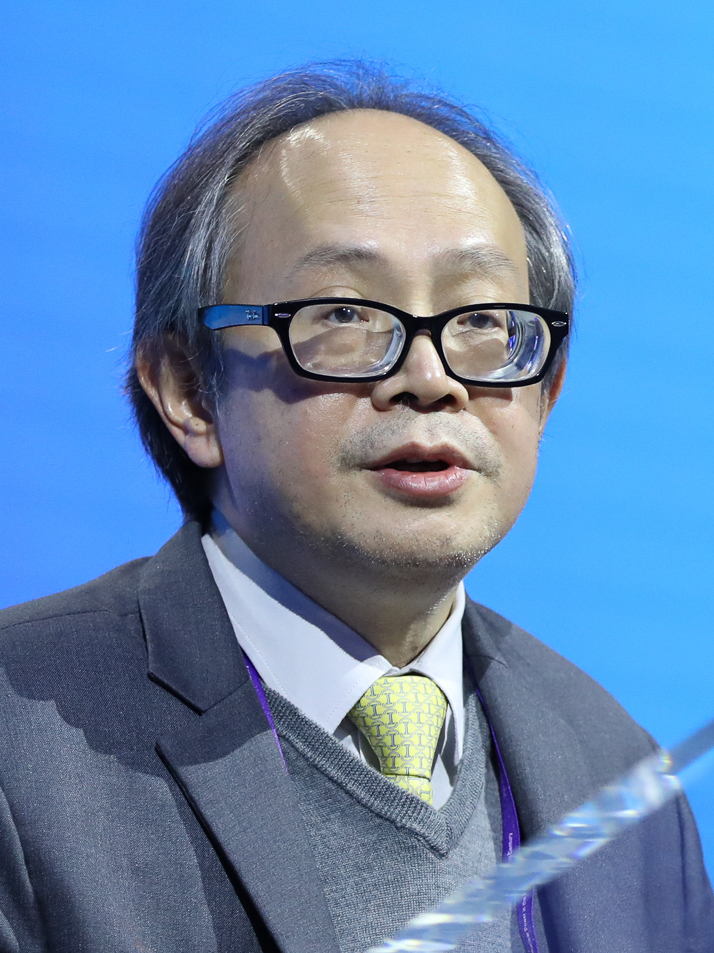

Thai Ambassador to the United States
- Incumbent
- Assumed office June 2024
- Monarch: Vajiralongkorn
- Prime Minister: Anutin Charnvirakul; Srettha Thavisin; Paetongtarn Shinawatra
- Preceded by: Tanee Sangrat

Thai Ambassador to the United Nations
- In office 2021–2024
- Preceded by: Vitavas Srivihok
- Succeeded by: Cherdchai Chaivaivid

Thai Ambassador to Singapore
- In office 2020–2021

Personal details
- Education: Lafayette College (BA); Tufts University (MA, PhD)

Suriya Chindawongse (Thai: สุริยา จินดาวงษ์, RTGS: Suriya Chindawong) is a Thai diplomat and the current Thai Ambassador to the United States, serving since June 2024. Suriya previously served as the Thai Ambassador to the United Nations from 2021 to 2024 and the Thai Ambassador to Singapore from 2020 to 2021.

== Thai Ambassador to the United Nations ==
Suriya presented his letters of credence to UN Secretary-General António Guterres on December 6, 2021. In March 2022, Suriya condemned Russia's invasion of Ukraine in a United Nations General Assembly vote. On October 12, Suriya abstained from a later vote condemning Russian elections in occupied Ukrainian territories. In June 2023, he delivered a speech before a UN vote advocating for a peaceful end to the war in Ukraine.

== Thai Ambassador to the United States ==
Suriya presented his letters of credence to President Joe Biden on June 17, 2024.
