= Izetta Roberts Cooper =

Izetta Roberts Cooper (born 1929) is a Liberian librarian and writer.

== Life ==
Izetta Roberts was born on October 13, 1929. Her father, the Liberian senator Isaac Roberts, had died earlier that year. She attended St. Teresa Convent elementary school, followed by high school at the College of West Africa, where she graduated with a diploma in 1948. She proceeded to Boston University, graduating with a B.Sc. in education in 1954. She married the doctor Henry Nehemiah Cooper on July 11, 1953. She then completed an M.L.S. from Case Western Reserve University in 1955.

After completing library training, Cooper worked in the library of Fisk University, before returning to Liberia to become a librarian at the University of Liberia. She also served as consultant for President William Tubman's Presidential Library. From 1978 to 1980 she hosted and produced a TV show called The World of Books.

After Cooper met African-American quilting expert Kyra E. Hicks in the Washington, D.C., area in 2008, the pair collaborated on Liberia: A Visit Through Books, a bibliography of Liberia combined with Cooper's autobiographical reminiscences.

== Works ==
- Cooper, Izetta Roberts; Hicks, Kyra E. (2008). Liberia: A Visit Through Books. ISBN 978-0-557-02053-9.
- Cooper, Henry Nehemiah; Cooper, Izetta Roberts; Barnes, Dawn Cooper; Hicks, Kyra E. (2011). The return of the guinea fowl: an autobiographical novel of a Liberian doctor. ISBN 978-1-4609-4935-1.
