= Embassy Gulf Service Station =

- U.S. National Register of Historic Places
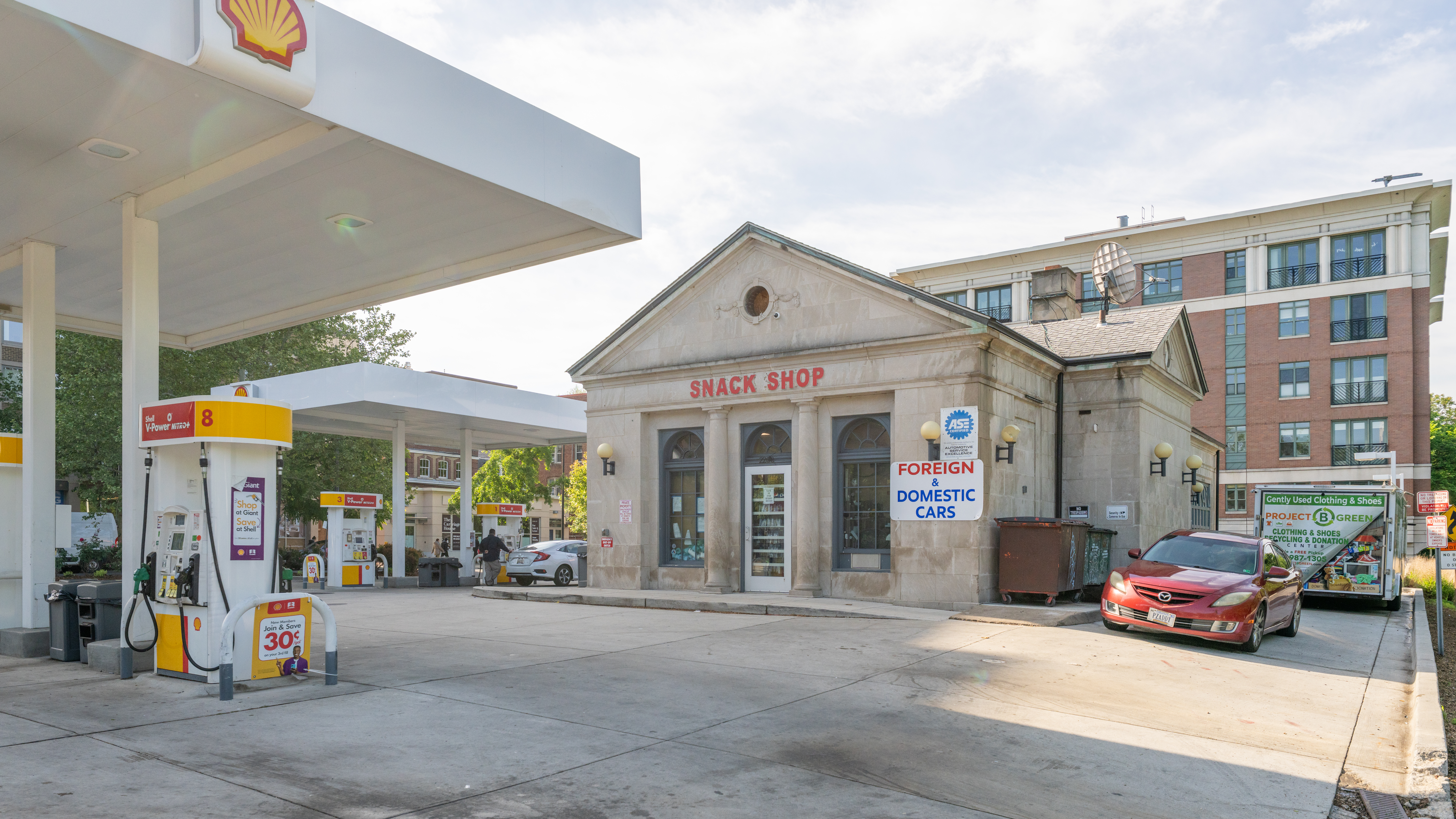
- (2026)

- Location within Washington, D.C. Location within the United States
- Location: 2200 P Street, N.W., Washington, D.C.
- Coordinates: 38.90956°0′0″N 77.04914°0′0″W
- Built: 1937
- Architect: Pierre L. R. Hogner
- Architectural style: Classical Revival
- NRHP reference No.: 93001014
- Added to NRHP: September 30, 1993

The Embassy Gulf Service Station is a service station in Washington, D.C., located on P Street near Dupont Circle and at the entrance to the Georgetown neighborhood. Constructed in 1937, it was added to the National Register of Historic Places in 1993.

== History ==
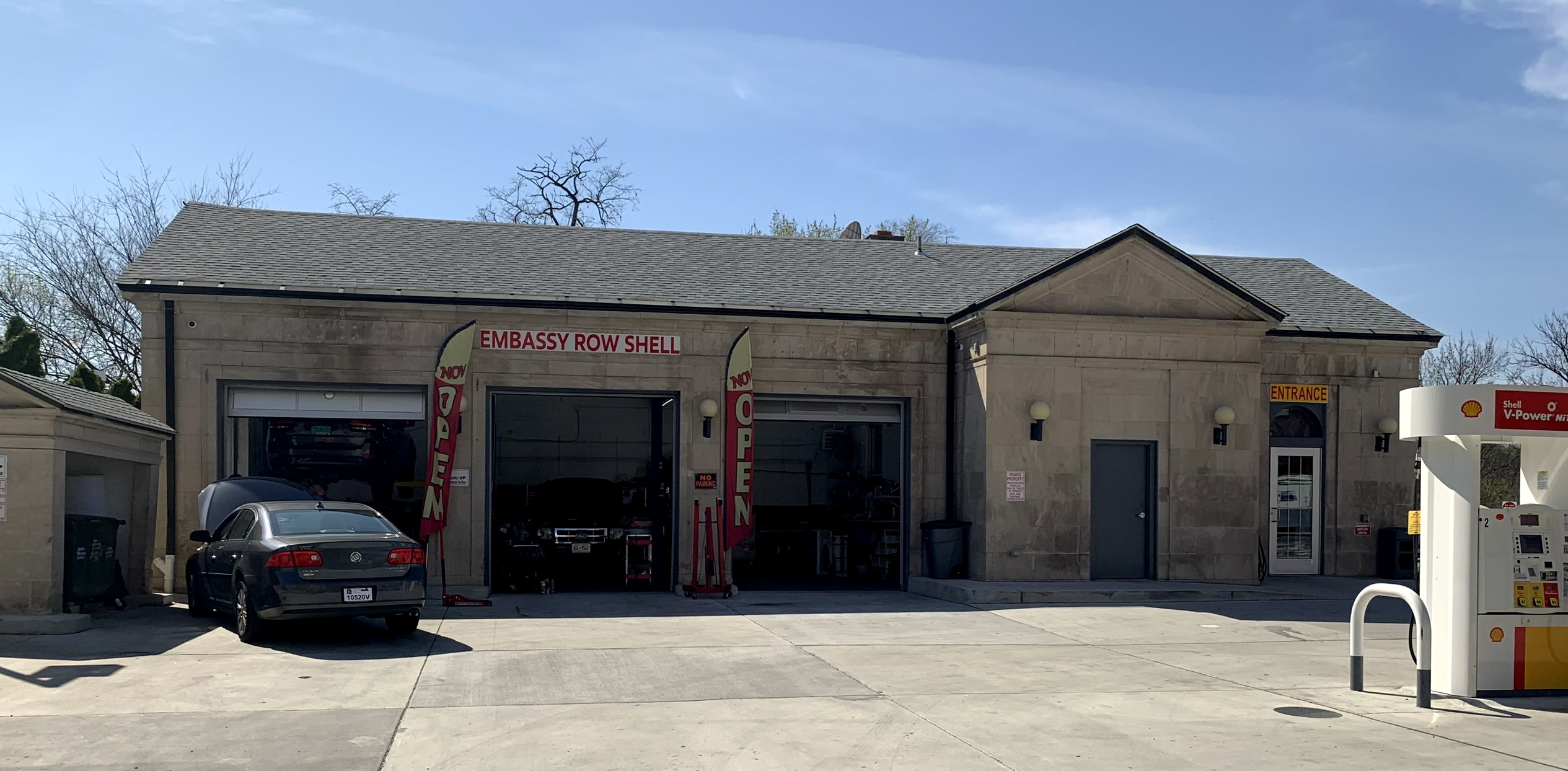
Another view of the station

The station was designed in 1936 by Gulf Oil Corporation's architect P. L. R. Hogner as part of a company drive to create buildings that looked less like gas stations and more like banks and libraries in their details, materials, and massing.

The Embassy Gulf Service Station was to be Gulf Oil's 61st station within the city of Washington. Because its site was next to Rock Creek Park, the building's design was reviewed and modified somewhat by the Commission of Fine Arts, the National Park Service, and the National Capital Park and Planning Commission. The final design called for a small building of grey stone similar in color to the church opposite the station; whether or not the two buildings harmonized by design is unknown.

The Embassy Gulf Service Station was listed on the National Register of Historic Places on September 30, 1993. It is still used for its original purpose; From at least 2007 to 2018, the building was a Sunoco station. Since at least 2021, the building has been a Shell station and service center.

== See also ==
- National Register of Historic Places listings in the District of Columbia
