= Martha Codman Karolik =

American art collector

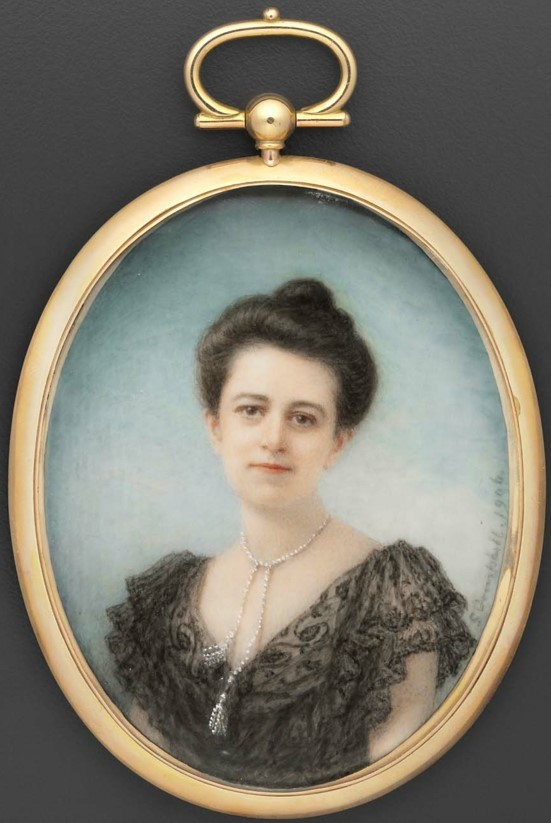
Martha Codman, 1906, by Georgine Campbell

Martha Catherine Codman Karolik (July 24, 1858 – April 21, 1948) was a philanthropist and American art collector based in Newport, Rhode Island. In 1939 and 1947 she and her husband Maxim Karolik donated two major collections of early American furniture, paintings, and prints and drawings to the Boston Fine Arts Museum, which built a new wing to house it. While the couple had purchased many of the nineteenth-century paintings and other works of their 1947 donation, much of the first collection donated in 1939 consisted of works she had inherited, which were collected by family and colonial ancestors.

== Biography ==
Martha Catherine Codman was born on July 24, 1858, in a family whose wealth was built largely from the Russian and China clipper trade. She was the only surviving child of John Amory Codman (1824–1886) and Martha Pickman Rogers (1829–1905). She grew up in Newport, Rhode Island, and Boston. She was the great-great-granddaughter of merchant Elias Hasket Derby, considered America's first millionaire. In 1923 she published the journal of her ancestor, Catherine Willard, as Journal of Mrs. John Amory.

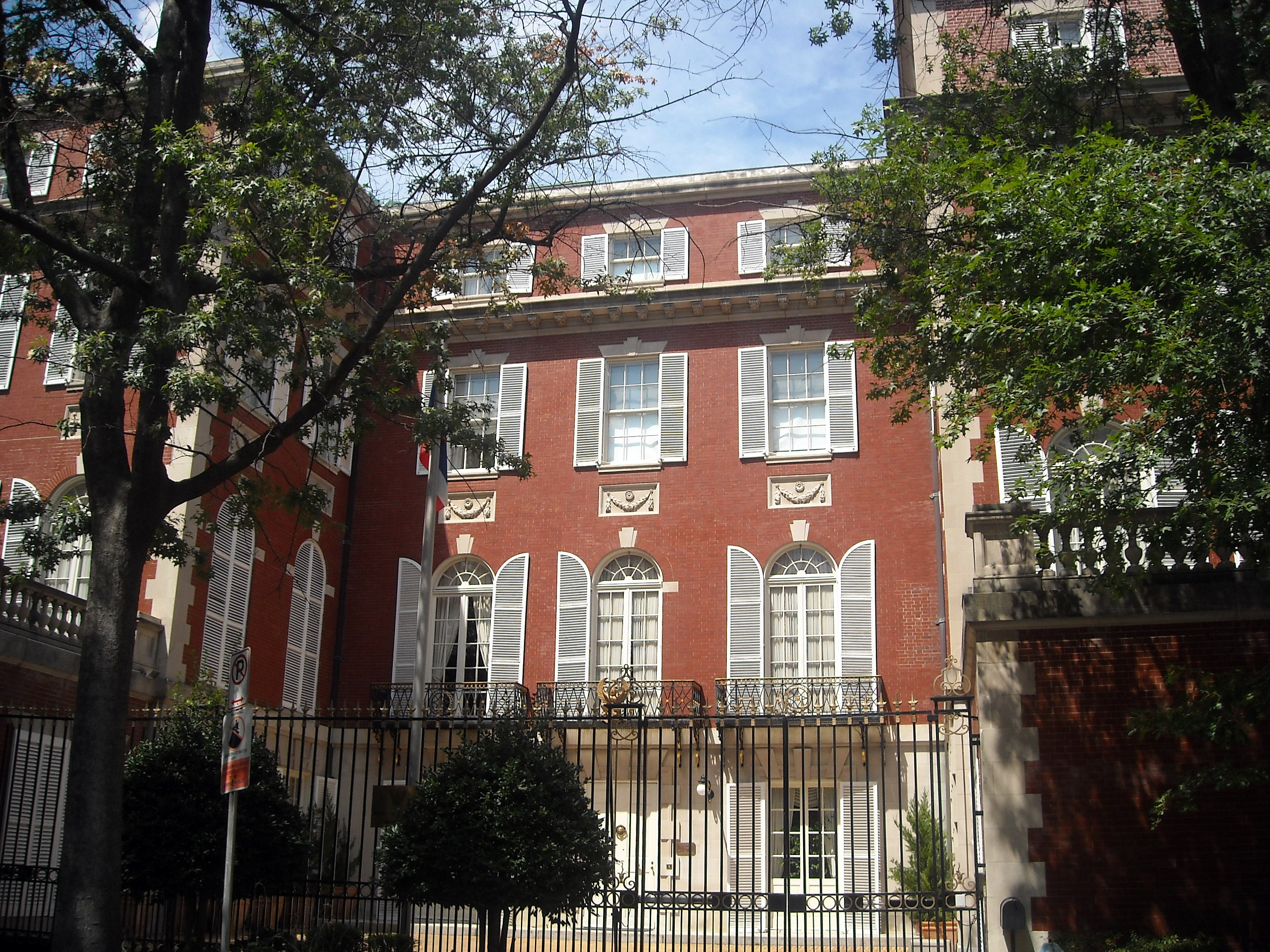
Codman-Davis House

In 1907, she commissioned her cousin Ogden Codman Jr. to build a private house in Washington, DC; it was later known as the Codman–Davis House. He took inspiration from the Château de Voisins, Louveciennes, Seine et Oise. She also commissioned him to build nearby supporting structures of stables and apartments, known as the Codman Carriage House and Stable.

In 1928 at the age of 69, Codman married Maxim Karolik, a much younger Russian opera singer. Martha Codman Karolik sold her Washington, DC house in 1938, during the Great Depression. In 1995 the Codman-Davis House was serving as the official residence of the Ambassador of Thailand, and it is one of the few intact homes designed by Ogden Codman Jr. He also designed the Codman Carriage House and Stable, which later served variously as a store, nightclub, and office space.

In 1910 Codman commissioned her cousin again, to design what was known as "Berkeley Villa" (now Bellevue House), a Colonial Revival mansion in Newport, Rhode Island, where she spent most summers. Later the house was owned by Jane Pickens Hoving, an American singer on Broadway, radio and television for 20 years. She was married to Walter Hoving, owner of Tiffany & Company and Bonwit Teller. Ronald Lee Fleming, an urban planner, bought the house in 1999. Bellevue House was Ogden Codman's last project in Newport. It now houses part of the American art collection that Martha Codman amassed, at first by herself and then with her husband.

On February 2, 1928, Martha Codman married Maxim Karolik (1893-1963), a Russian opera singer by profession, scandalizing Boston society. He was 30 or 35 years younger than she.

Martha Codman was a leader in Newport, a member of Art Association of Newport, Garden Club, Improvement Association, Newport Historical Society, and Redwood Library.

In 1944 Maxim Karolik bought Expulsion from the Garden of Eden by Thomas Cole. Martha Codman donated the painting to the Museum of Fine Arts in Boston in 1947. This painting is still held by the museum and can be seen on display in their galleries.

It was among 225 paintings the couple donated to the museum in 1947, works that are largely from the period 1815–1865.

Martha Codman Karolik died on April 21, 1948.

== Legacy ==
In 1939 the Karoliks donated their 18th-century collection of American paintings, furniture, silver and other examples of art to the Boston Museum of Fine Arts. It totaled 300 pieces, and the museum built a wing for it. Martha Codman had inherited many pieces in this collection from near family and colonial ancestors. At the time it was valued at $400,000 ($9,258,373 in 2025 dollars).

In 1947, the couple donated some 225 paintings to the museum, chiefly by American artists of the period 1815–1865. The Martha & Maxim Karolik Collection of American Paintings (1815-1865) is considered one of the most important collection of American pictures in public or private hands of that period.

The Karolik-Codman family papers (1714-1964) are hosted at the Massachusetts Historical Society.
