= Georgine (brand) =

Fashion brand

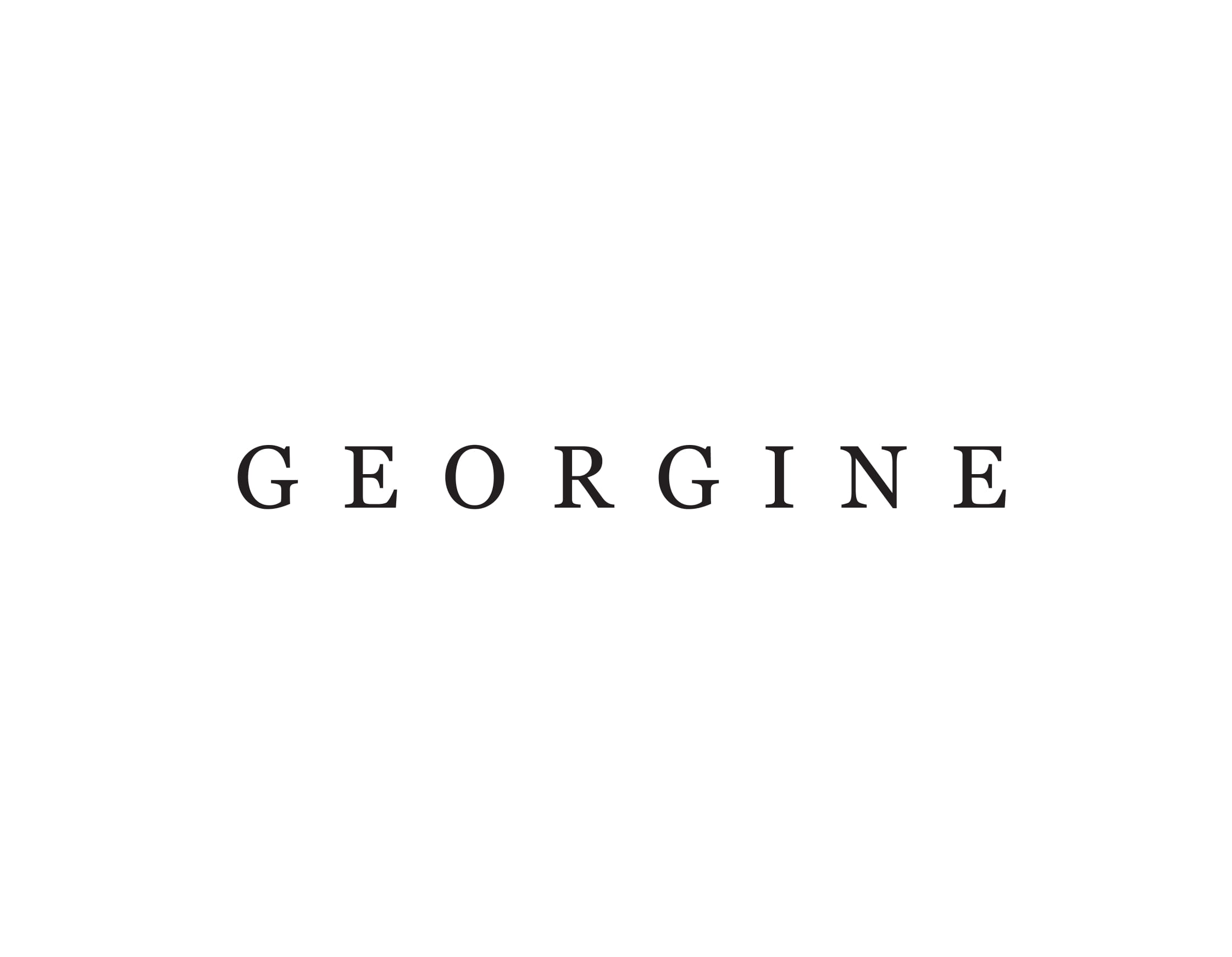
- Type: Private
- Industry: Fashion
- Founded: 2014; 12 years ago
- Headquarters: New York City, United States
- Website: www.georgine.com

Georgine is a women's ready-to-wear brand founded in New York City.

== History ==
Georgine was launched by the fashion designer Georgine Ratelband and was founded in 2014. Before completing her graduation from Istituto Europeo di Design in 2011, thesis-collection of Georgine was acquired by a boutique in Antwerp, Belgium. Georgine was presented at New York Fashion Week, and their designs have rated the pages of Women's Wear Daily, W Magazine and Vogue Italia.

Shortly following the launch of the brand Ratelband was surprised to discover that Beyoncé wore one of her pieces on the red carpet during her husband Jay-Z's Tidal X Event at Brooklyn's Barclays Center. Since then Georgine has dressed numerous celebrities including: Lady Gaga, Zendaya, Jennifer Lopez, Cardi B, Demi Moore, Alicia Keys, Bella Hadid, Lena Dunham, The Kardashians, Tracey Ellis Ross, Mariah Carey, Patina Miller, Elizabeth Gilles, Sarah Rafferty, Victoria's Secret Models; Rosie Huntington-Whiteley, Romee Strijd, etc.

== Collections ==
Georgine Ratelband debuted their first runway collection for NYFW Fall 2014.

- 2014: Georgine runway NYFW Fall 2014
- 2015 Georgine Fall 2015
- 2016: Georgine fall 2016 runway
- 2017: Georgine RTW Spring 2017
- 2018: Georgine Spring 2018 RTW

== See also ==
- Fashion design
- Armani
- Alexander McQueen
- Haute couture
