= Georgine Gerhard =

- Born: 18 August 1886; Basel, Switzerland
- Died: 21 December 1971; Basel, Switzerland
- Occupation(s): Teacher; Women's rights activist Welfare activist Refugee support administrator
- Parents: Emil Gerhard (father); Georgine Fünkner (mother)

Georgine Gerhard (18 August 1886 - 21 December 1971) was a Swiss school teacher and administrator who was forced by hearing loss to take early retirement. Her wider legacy comes from her campaigning. She was a women's rights activist and also backed various humanitarian causes. During the 1930s she turned her attention to the growing refugee crisis which re-emerged in Europe during the middle part of the twentieth century. In 1934 she established the Basel section of the "Schweizer Hilfswerk für Emigrantenkinder" ("Swiss Support for Émigré Children" organisation / BHEK), following that organisation's foundation in Zürich by her fellow activist, Nettie Sutro-Katzenstein, the previous year.

== Life ==
=== Provenance and early years ===
Georgine Gerhard was born in Basel, the third of her parents' five children. She grew up in a spacious house with a large garden in the Gellert Quarter, a prosperous part of the city on the left bank (south side) of the river. Emil Gerhard, her father, was a top manager ("Prokurist") with the long-established "Sarasin Brothers" industrial weaving business. Both her parents came from families of teachers, and had grown up in Baden. They had relocated to Basel in 1882.

As a girl she attended the Free Evangelical [middle] School, followed by three years at the "Töchterschule" (as it was known at that time), a prestigious single-sex high school in the heart of the city, before moving on to Basel's teacher training college for women, and in 1906 emerging with the necessary qualifications. After lengthy stays in France and England undertaken in order to polish her language skills, by 1909 she was back in Basel. She returned to the "Töchterschule", now as a member of the teaching staff. She taught German, French, History, Geography and even Gymnastics, dealing with classes that typically ranged between 35 and 42 in size.

Gerhard never married. There was a long tradition that women teachers who married should lose their jobs in order to concentrate on family responsibilities. In the case of Basel this so-called "[Women] Teachers' Celibacy rule" was even adopted as a cantonal law in 1922. Schools facing staff shortages could employ married teachers as "Vikarinnen" (loosely, "supply teachers"), but these would receive reduced salaries and, initially, would be required to work without any pension entitlement. This discriminatory regulation was thrown out only in 1965, through parliamentary legislation passed at a national level.

Alongside her teaching duties, Gerhard took on a number of administrative and organisational responsibilities at the school. Outside the school she was able to make arrangements at the university to develop her languages skills further. As far back as 1890 Basel had become the first university in Switzerland to accept a female student, a medical student called Emilie Frey; but for women of Gerhard's generation university degrees were still highly unusual, and there seems to have been no suggestion that she should enrol as a university student.

=== Hearing loss ===
After teaching for ten years she was forced by progressively encroaching hearing loss to abandon her teaching role in 1919, but she remained at the school for more than two further decades, employed both as "school secretary" and in a complementary advisory role until taking early retirement in 1942.

=== Votes for women and family welfare activism ===
During her time in England before 1909 Gerhard discovered and took a close interest in that country's "Suffragettes" and the "Votes for Women" movement. On returning home she kept in touch with the English activists. Her experiences inspired her to co-found, in 1916, the "Vereinigung für Frauenstimmrecht Basel und Umgebung", committed to the advocacy of votes for women in and around Basel. She served as president of the campaigning organisation between 1917 and 1922, and again between 1935 and 1941. She became closely networked with other likeminded campaigners, such as Emma Graf in Bern and her colleague at the school, the teacher Rosa Göttisheim. Between 1918 and 1928 she served as a member of the executive committee of the national "Schweizerischer Verband für Frauenstimmrecht" ("Swiss League for Women's Voting Rights" / SVF). It was as a representative of the SVF that she became a regular delegate to conferences of what was then the "International Woman Suffrage Alliance" (IWSA), which over the years involved trips to Paris, Berlin and Prague. Between 1920 and 1933 Gerhard also headed up the secretariat of the Swiss Association of Women Teachers ("Schweizerischer Lehrerinnenverein"). and was a member of the editorial team for the Swiss Women's Yearbook ("Jahrbuch der Schweizerfrauen").

Between the wars she was, in addition, a member of the Commission on Family Allowances set up by the "Bund Schweizerischer Frauenvereine" ("League of Swiss Women's Associations" / "Alliance de sociétés féminines suisses" / BSF/ASF). She was also a member of the Families Protection Commission set up by the "Schweizerische Gemeinnützige Gesellschaft" ("Swiss Mutual Support Society" / "Société suisse d'utilité publique" / SGG/SSUP). She campaigned for gender-equal pay and for the introduction of Family Allowances.

=== Refugee support ===
During the 1930s, with democracy in retreat to the south and to the north, Georgine Gerhard became president of the Basel branch of the Women's International League for Peace and Freedom (" Internationale Frauenliga für Frieden und Freiheit" / IFFF). Few details are available as to her religious upbringing, but it is believed that she drew strength from a Christian belief in religious socialism and Quakerism. As the international political horizon darkened after 1933, Georgine Gerhard emerged as a powerful advocate for an international solution to the looming return of a refugee crisis and, with respect to Switzerland, of a liberal asylum policy.

In 1933 Georgine Gerhard was a co-founder member of the Swiss section of the "Comité d'aide aux enfants des émigrés allemands, Schweizersektion", an organisation created to protect the interests of the children of political and/or race-based exiles from, in the first instance, Hitler's Germany. In 1934 she set up a parallel organisation in her home city, the "Basler Hilfe für Emigrantenkinder" (BHEK), rebadged in 1935 as the "Schweizer Hilfswerk für Emigrantenkinder" (SHEK). She served as president of the BHEK / SHEK, working closely with Nettie Sutro-Katzenstein, an exiled Jewish scholar originally from Munich, who sat alongside her as a fellow member of the executive committee. Between 1934 and 1939 they created an infrastructure of temporary welfare support and care/accommodation for slightly below 5,000 Jewish children, including 2,574 from Germany and 2.318 from Russia, whose parents were believed to have escaped to France, while the children waited to be reunited with their families in the relative safety of Switzerland. The first train arrived in April 1934. The year there were 122 children. The next year there were 543. By the time war broke out in 1939 an increasingly structured pattern had been established whereby the children were looked after in Switzerland for between 6 and 12 weeks before moving on to another safe country. Sources stress the resolutely non-political; nature of the work. The women of SHEK worked with all willing volunteers and families, their only focus being on providing suitable recreational and vacational accommodation with Swiss host families for the children who fell into their protective care. Organising the children's accommodation often included gruelling negotiations with cantonal authorities. Not all cantons were supportive: some refused to admit the refugee children while others demanded large cash deposits before they would co-operate. Negotiations with the national government in Bern were also tough. At one stage the upper age limit for children permitted to enter the country was reduced from 17 to 14. Gerhard protested in vain that in Hitler's Germany the Jewish teenagers aged between 15 and 17 - especially the boys - were at particular risk.

Gerhard used her international contacts, networking with women from Quaker circles, and invoked contacts in the "Bundesrat" and at the League of Nations. She also lobbied personally Heinrich Rothmund, Switzerland's long-standing federal (nationwide) head of Migration Policing. In each case, she put the case for the refugees, most particularly for the child refugees. A particular case in point came in the aftermath of the "November pogrom" in 1938, when Gerhard and Sutro-Katzenstein succeeded in obtaining a special permit in respect of 300 Jewish children from Frankfurt, Konstanz and one or two other towns in southern Germany near the Swiss border at Basel, the so-called "300-Kinder-Aktion". The children arrived in January 1939, their number increased beyond the 300 quota by children from the border region in fear for their lives. Some of the official bodies that had agreed to the admission of the 300 now refused admission to any of the children, and a number had to be smuggled illegally across the border. Georgine Gerhard's initial reaction was to run to the press and have the responsible officials and politicians shamed, but in the end the cooler counsels of her SHEK colleagues prevailed, and the necessary negotiations with the various authorities involved were concluded "behind the scenes". Possibly as a reflection of the international situation, plans had been made for this batch of 300 children to stay in Switzerland for six months rather than the two or three months that had become the norm with earlier batches looked after by the SHEK. Thanks to the outbreak of war, in which the countries to the north and west of Switzerland were participants from September 1939, for most of the children involved the six-month stay in Switzerland became a six-year live-saving stay.

=== War years ===
Switzerland avoided direct participation in the Second World War, as it had in the First. Nevertheless, with effect from June 1940, all the surrounding countries were actively involved as belligerents; and neutral Switzerland was deeply impacted in all sorts of ways. Early in 1940 the SHEK joined up with the "Schweizerischen Arbeitsgemeinschaft für kriegsgeschädigte Kinder" (SAK) which had grown up out of the need to look after children orphaned by the Spanish Civil War. In 1942 the resulting combination was rebranded as the "Kinderhilfe des Schweizerischen Roten Kreuzes" ("Swiss Red Cross Child Support") organisation. Till the end of the war Georgine Gerhard continued to work within the organisation as a frontline organiser of support for refugee children arriving from abroad. Between 1939 and 1945 SHEK looked after approximately a further 5,000 Jewish child refugees, most of whom had entered Switzerland illegally. During this period the SHEK was running its own children's homes, and in 1944 it created its own "National Homes Commission" ("Zentrale Heimkommission"), over which Georgine Gerhard presided. Towards the end of the war it became an increasing priority to find new destinations and homelands for all the refugee children. Gerhard herself would remain in close contact with many of her former refugee children for the rest of her life. She was a co-founder of what became the interdenominational "Kiriat Yearim Swiss children's village" just outside Jerusalem, and in 1948 was able to visit former refugee children in Israel in person. She followed through with a visit in 1964 to the other country where many if the refugee children had ended up, the United States.

Gerhard also found time to serve as a vice-president of the "Arbeitsgemeinschaft Frau und Demokratie" ("Women and Democracy Working Community") between 1940 and 1954. (Note: Although "votes for women" became mainstream in most of western Europe during the aftermath of the First World War, in Switzerland it was not till 1959 that little by little women won the right to vote. At a cantonal level, by 1972 women won had the vote across the country, other than in Appenzell, where they had to wait till 1990. The first federal (national) election in which women participated was that of 1971.)

=== After the war ===
Her wartime engagement left Georgine Gerhard's international profile greatly enhanced. In 1947 she accepted an invitation to become a member of the United Nations Study Commission for Women's Questions.

== Recognition ==
In 1961 Georgine Gerhard accepted an Honorary Doctorate in Medicine ("Dr. honoris causa"), conferred in recognition of her commitment and work on behalf of refugees. She received another significant honour from the "Kiriat Yearim Swiss children's village" in Israel which named one of its houses after her.
