= Maxim Karolik =

Art collector

- Born: November 21, 1893; Akkerman, Bessarabia, Russian Empire
- Died: December 20, 1963 (aged 70); Manhattan, New York City, New York, United States
- Occupation: Singer
- Known for: Art collecting
- Spouse: Martha Catharine Codman (m. 1928; died 1948)

Maxim Karolik (November 21, 1893 – December 20, 1963), born in what is now Ukraine, he became a featured tenor for the Imperial Russian Grand Opera (later known as the Petrograd Grand Opera). He toured in Europe as a young man. He left Russia during the Bolshevik Revolution and moved to the United States to continue study of music.

There he met and married Martha Catharine Codman, from one of Boston, Massachusetts's wealthiest families. He became a noted collector of early American art, and the couple were influential in promoting eighteenth and nineteenth American art and antiques. In 1939 and 1947 they made valuable donations of their collections to the Museum of Fine Arts, Boston, where a new wing was built and named for them.

== Early life ==
Maxim Karolik was born on November 21, 1893, in Akkerman, Ukraine. He became a professional opera singer, and made his debut as a tenor at the old Imperial Russian Grand Opera, later known as the Petrograd Opera. He toured in Europe, including to Italy, England, and other countries, and made his debut in New York City in 1924. Because of the Bolshevik Revolution, he left Russia during the unrest. He moved to the United States to continue his study of music.

In 1927 in Washington, DC Karolik met Martha Catharine Codman, a wealthy socialite who was 30 years older than he. With homes in the capital and Newport, Rhode Island, she was said to be worth $25 million to $40 million. She was a daughter of J. Amory Codman and his wife Martha Pickman Rogers Codman of Boston. Karolik and Codman married on February 2, 1928, in the French Riviera.

== Marriage and collecting career ==
Over the following decades, Karolik and his wife Martha became noted collectors of eighteenth and nineteenth century American antiques, furnishings, and art. The furniture was mostly made in Rhode Island, in the period 1720–1820. They were guided in their purchases by specialists at the Museum of Fine Arts, Boston.

The Karoliks donated some 300 pieces of their collection to the museum in 1939, during the late years of the Great Depression. It was then valued at $400,000, and had a pre-Depression value of $1,000,000. Mrs.Karolik had inherited many of the pieces of silver, engravings, and other artifacts from her colonial ancestors. The collection was so large that the museum built a new wing to house it, naming it the Karolik wing.

Karolik and his wife are considered largely responsible for spurring mid-20th century interest in 19th-century American art of the period 1815–1865, what was once called the "barren period". In January 1947 the couple donated some 225 paintings from this period, which they had collected over a period of two decades, to the Museum of Fine Arts, Boston. Their collection featured such notable artists as Washington Allston, Albert Bierstadt, Chester Harding, Martin Johnson Heade, George Inness, Eastman Johnson, Fitz Henry Lane, Rembrandt Peale, and Thomas Sully.

Also among their purchases was the notable American textile, the Pictorial Quilt 1898 created by Harriet Powers (MFA accession no. 64.619), a Georgia woman who was born into slavery. It is one of two surviving quilts by Powers, considered a top Southern artist of the nineteenth century. The Karoliks donated the quilt to the Museum of Fine Arts, Boston. The other quilt is held and displayed by the National Museum of American History in Washington, DC.

== Personal life ==
While regularly spending time in Washington and Boston, the Karoliks lived full-time in Newport, Rhode Island. They also traveled extensively.

Martha Codman Karolik died in 1948.

Afterward Karolik gave a third large donation of collected art works to the Museum of Fine Arts. He also returned to music. Karolik recorded Russian Art Songs (1958), thirty songs collected in a three-album set from Unicorn Records in Boston. A 48-page book was included with the album set. It had an introductory essay by Nicholas Slonimsky titled "Russian Music in Art Songs."

In 1963 Karolik traveled from Newport to New York for a meeting to arrange lectures and other events related to his art philanthropy. He died on December 20, 1963, at Trafalgar Hospital in Manhattan.
