= Denmark–Thailand relations =

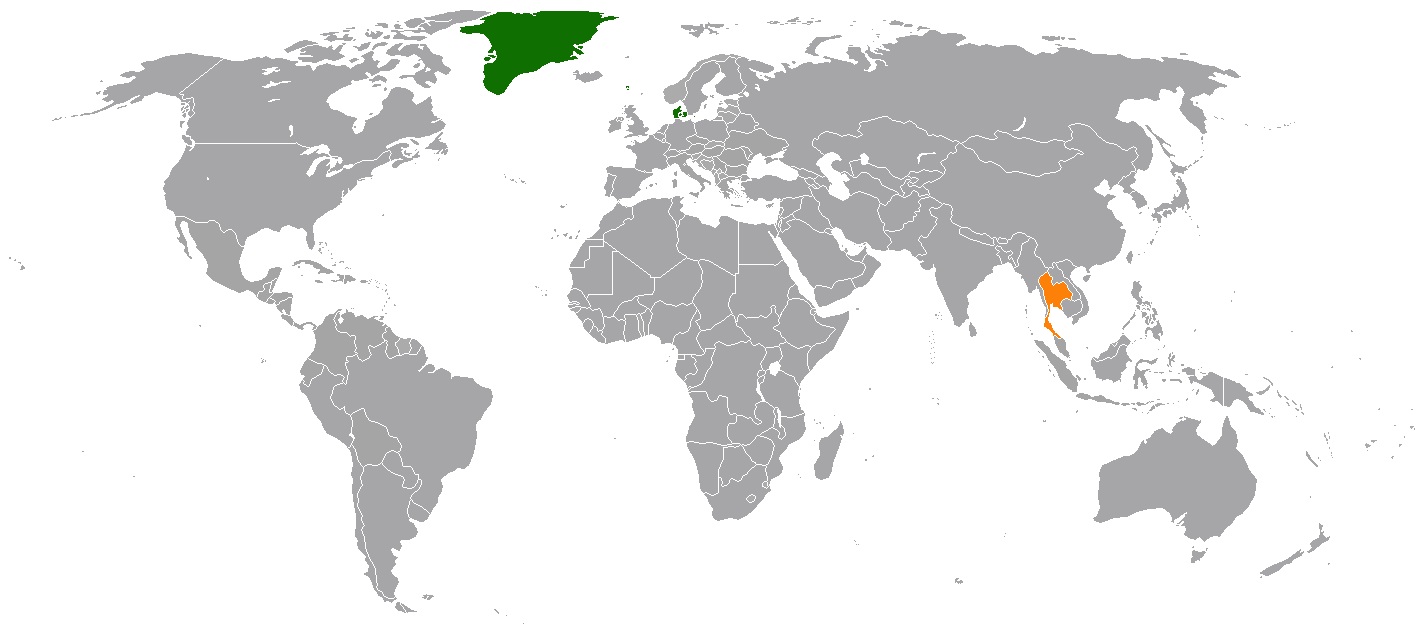
- Denmark: Thailand

Diplomatic mission
- Embassy of Denmark, Bangkok: Royal Thai Embassy, Copenhagen

Envoy
- Jon Thorgaard: Suphanvasa Chotikajan Tang

Denmark–Thailand relations date back to 1621. Denmark operates an embassy in Bangkok, along with a consulate in Phuket, although it used to have one in Pattaya. The Danish embassy in Bangkok also handles Danish relations with Cambodia, with the current Danish ambassador of Thailand also being the ambassador to Cambodia. Thailand itself operates an embassy in Copenhagen.

During the late 1800s and early 1900s, Denmark played a significant part in modernising Siam. Thailand is a popular tourist location for Danish travellers as well for 100 Danish companies that operate there. In 2020, trade between Denmark and Thailand amounted to US$760 million.

== History ==
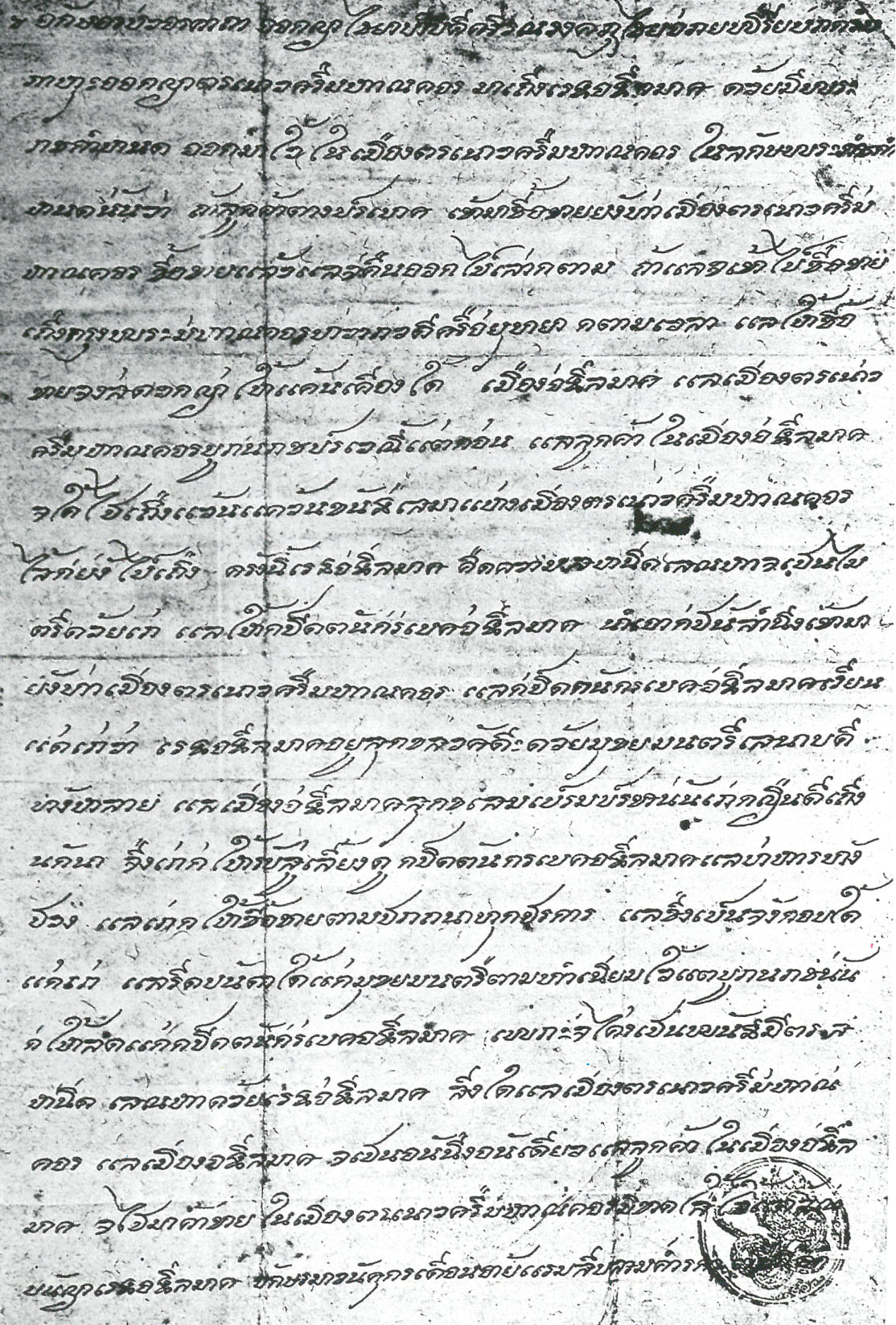
Letter written by Okya Chaiyathibodi giving the Danes permission to trade

=== Origins ===
In 1618, king Christian IV of Denmark sent lieutenant Ove Gjedde with two warships and two trading ships with the purpose of assisting the Sri Lankan Kingdom of Kandy, as well as securing a trade agreement with the kingdom. However negotiations for a trade agreement failed, and instead the Danish fleet was given the area around Tranquebar (now Tharangambadi) in southern India by the Kingdom of Thanjavur Nayak. At Tranquebar, the Danish built a fortress called Dansborg under the command of Roland Crappe, a Dutchman. In 1621, Crappe ventured from Tranquebar to Tanintharyi on the west coast of Myanmar which was then under the control of the Ayutthaya Kingdom under King Songtham. The governor of Tanintharyi granted the Danish merchants permission to trade with the locals on 10 December 1621. This marked the first formal exchange between the Danish and Siamese, with the Danes trading guns in exchange for elephants.

It was until 1770 that the Danes and Siamese formally interacted with each other. Under Taksin the Great, the Thonburi Kingdom ordered 10,000 cannons from the Danish Royal Asiatic company in exchange for tin. However, when the cannons were being shipped to Siam, some of them exploded and the order was subsequently cancelled.

=== Start of formal diplomatic relations ===
When Mongkut became king of Siam under the Rattanakosin Kingdom in 1851, he sought to modernize Siam in the face of European colonialism and opened Siam to foreign trade. On 21 May 1858, king Frederick VII of Denmark sent an envoy to Siam to sign the Treaty of Friendship, Commerce and Navigation which marked the beginning of formal relations between Denmark and Siam, and the first formal relations of Siam with a Nordic nation. Following this, the Danish established a consulate in Bangkok in 1860, while in 1882 Prince Prisadang Chumsai became the first Minister Plenipotentiary in Copenhagen.

=== Trade and modernization of Siam ===
Due to Denmark having no intention of seizing colonies in Asia, the Siamese government came to trust the Danish over the British and French. In 1856, a Danish explorer and merchant working for the Borneo company, Ludwig Verner Helms, introduced the Borneo company to the Siamese monarch Mongkut. Following this, the Borneo company established a branch in Bangkok.

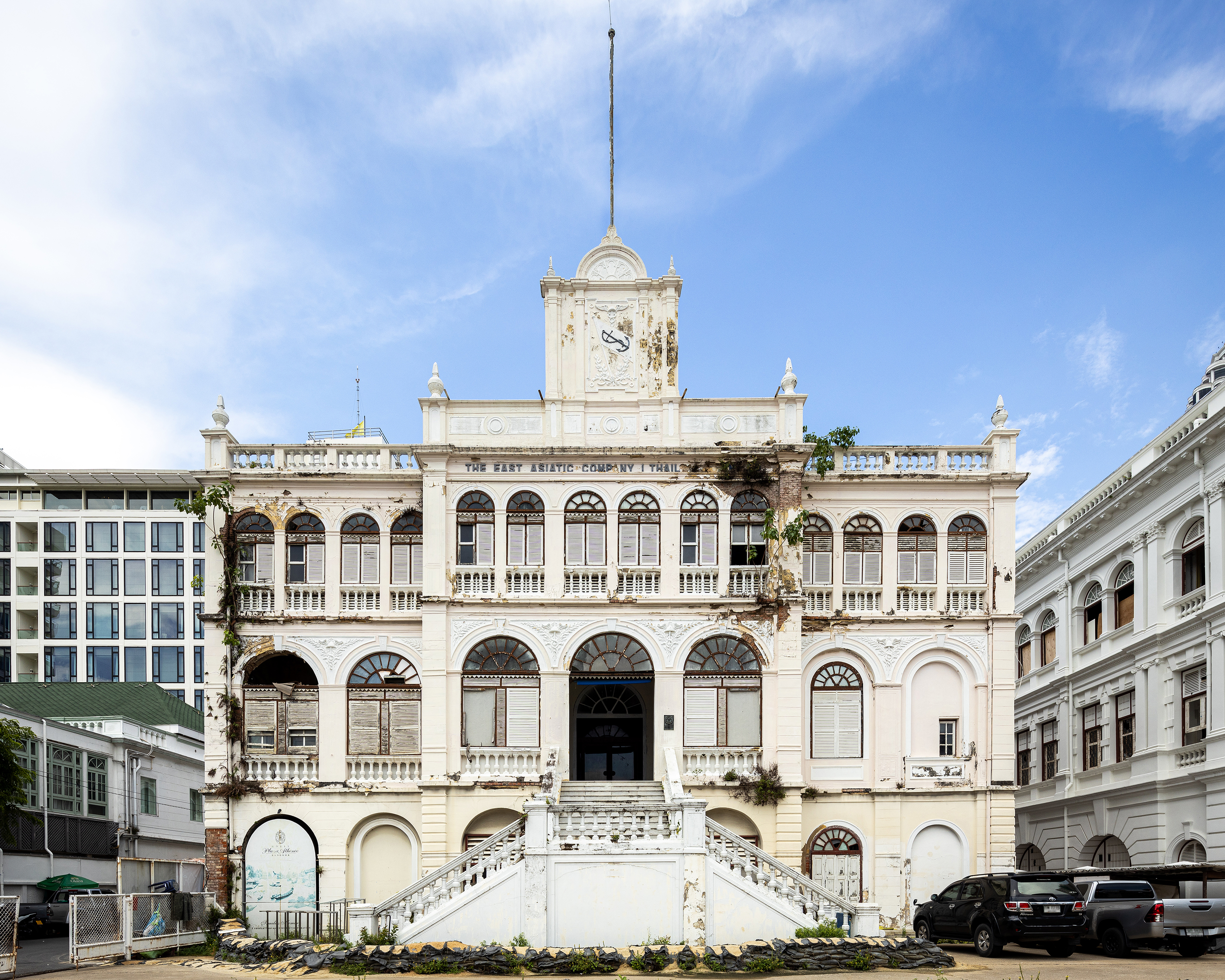
The East Asiatic building in Bangkok

As well as being involved in the navy, Andreas du Plessis de Richelieu also established several rail and tramlines around Bangkok, such as a railway to Samut Prakan from Bangkok called the Pak Nam route. The Royal Department of Railway Traffic Services then constructed its own line from Bangkok to Nakorn Ratchasima via Ayutthaya under the supervision of Danish entrepreneur Hans Niels Andersen. Another Danish businessman, Aage Westenholtz, arrived in Bangkok in 1886 and supervised the construction of Bangkok's first tram system which opened in 1888. In 1894, Westenholtz introduced the first electric tramway to replace the horse-drawn trams a decade before it was introduced in Copenhagen and would continue operations until 1969.

In 1884, with the assistance of Danish engineers, electricity was introduced in Bangkok. Richelieu later established the Siam Electric Company Ltd in 1898, which was the only provider of electricity to Bangkok. It was operated jointly with Westenholtz. With Hans Neil Andersen, Richelieu also established Andersen & Co. which operated the Oriental Hotel in Bangkok. H.N Andersen later went on to form the East Asiatic Company in March 1897 and was based in both Copenhagen and Bangkok. Along with other foreign companies, it operated teak plantations in the country's north. The East Asiatic building in Bangkok is today a historic site. In Denmark, the East Asiatic Company operated the Asia House, which was its first head office in Denmark from 1898 to 1907. H.N Andersen served as the first Honorary Consul of Thailand in Denmark from its establishment on 12 May 1898 to 1932. The Honorary Consulate closed in 2020 after the death of the last Honorary Consul Carsten Dencker Nielsen in 2019.

Richelieu also pitched the idea of a banking system to the Minister of Finance, Prince Mahit. In 1906, Siam Commercial Bank was formed by Chulalongkorn. Richelieu's Danish colleagues Hans Andersen, Isacc Gluckstadt, and C.F. Tietgen played significant roles in Siam Commercial Bank's formation. After Vajiravudh established Siam Cement in 1913, Siam Cement ordered machinery from the Danish company F.L. Smidth & Co, whilst Danish experts were put in charge in several positions in the company. Years later in 1960, Thai Airways International was founded by Scandinavian Airlines - the flag carrier of Denmark, Sweden and Norway - and Thai Airways Company, with Scandinavian Airlines owning a 30% share in the new company.

Chulalongkorn son Prince Chirapravati Voradej studied in Denmark along with Stanklang and Pin Snitwongse.

=== Danish involvement in the Siamese military ===
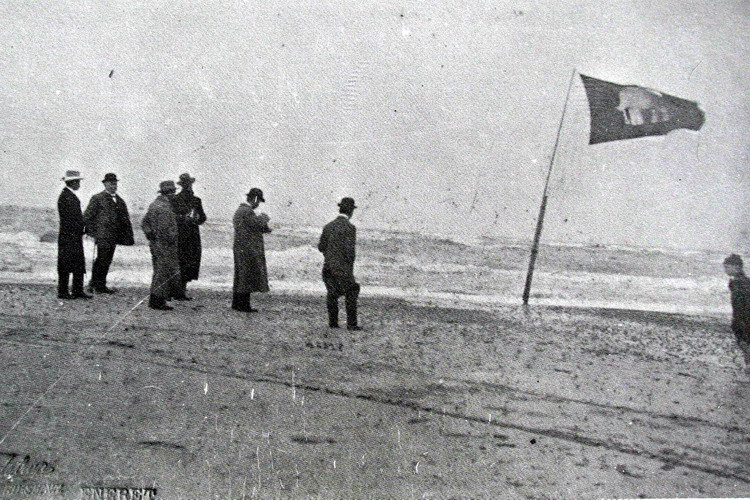
The flag of Siam placed at Grenen, Denmark on 4 July 1907 by King Chulalongkorn

In 1875, Andreas du Plessis de Richelieu was sent by Christian IX of Denmark to deliver a letter to Chulalongkorn of Siam. A few weeks later he was promoted to Captain-Lieutenant and he became superintendent of the Siamese Marine Forces in 1878, becoming the first Danish person to serve in the Siamese navy. During the Paknam incident on 13 July 1893 during the Franco-Siamese conflict, Richelieu commanded Phra Chulachomklao Fortress against the French. He would later serve as the commander-in-chief of the Royal Siamese Navy from 1900 and 1901 before retiring and returning to Denmark in 1902.

Other influential Danes included Gustav Schau who served as a marine and instructor the Royal Guard. In 1887 he helped defeat a revolt in Laos and again in 1888 against a Chinese revolt in Bangkok. Prince Damrong Rajanubhab later formed the provincial gendarmerie, with Gustav Schau as the first director of the Department of Provincial Gendarmerie from 1897 to 1815. Schau was later promoted to Phraya Wasuthep. Others include Captain Frederik Kobke who served as the first Danish consul in Bangkok, and Erik Seidenfaden who served as a provincial gendarmerie and evacuated all Thai officers from the 3 Siamese provinces in Cambodia with their families when they were ceded to France, and was later one of the founder of the Siam Society.

In 1902, during the Ngiao rebellion in the country's north, Gustav Schau and Hans Jensen played pivotal roles in defending Siam against the Shan rebels. Hans Jensen had arrived in Siam as a police trainer and led 54 police officers from Chaing Mai to Lampang to assist the city's defense. Along with Louis Leonowens, he organized defenses around Lampang and on 3 August 1902, successfully defended Lampang from Shans led by Phaka Mong. He later helped evacuate the Prince of Lampang with Leonowens. For his role in defending Lampang, Chulalongkorn intended to promote Jensen to the rank of Major General and bestow him with the Order of the Crown of Siam with a 10,000 baht reward. However, on 14 October 1902, he was abandoned by all of his men apart from Lieutenant Tjoen and was killed with Tjoen by Shan rebels. Jensen mother then received 3000 baht. As the war came to a close, Gustav Schau led the provincial gendarmerie to Phrae but was unable to enter due to the wishes of the British consulate Harold Lyle.

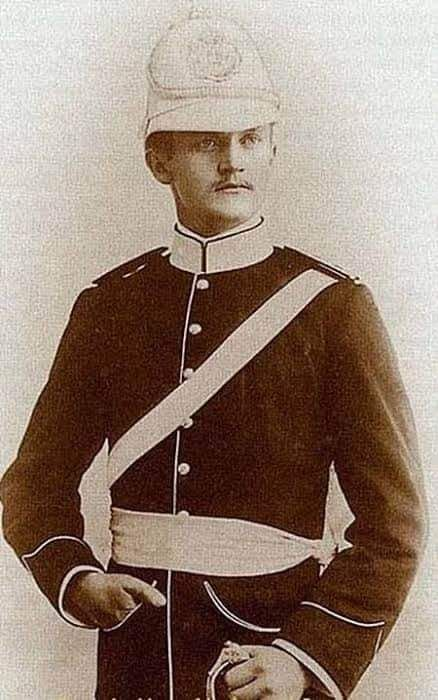
Hans Markvard Jensen

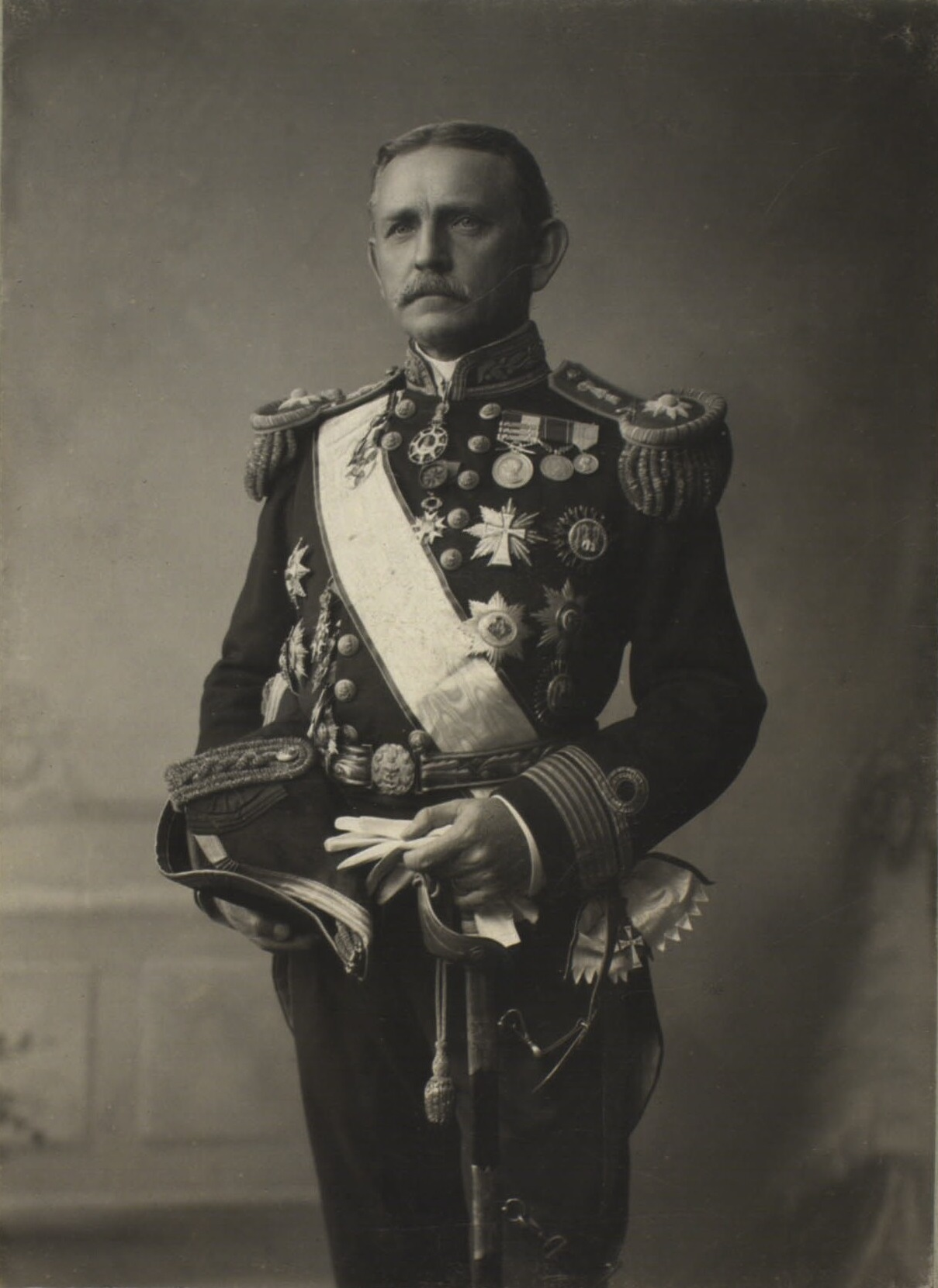
Andreas du Plessis de Richelieu

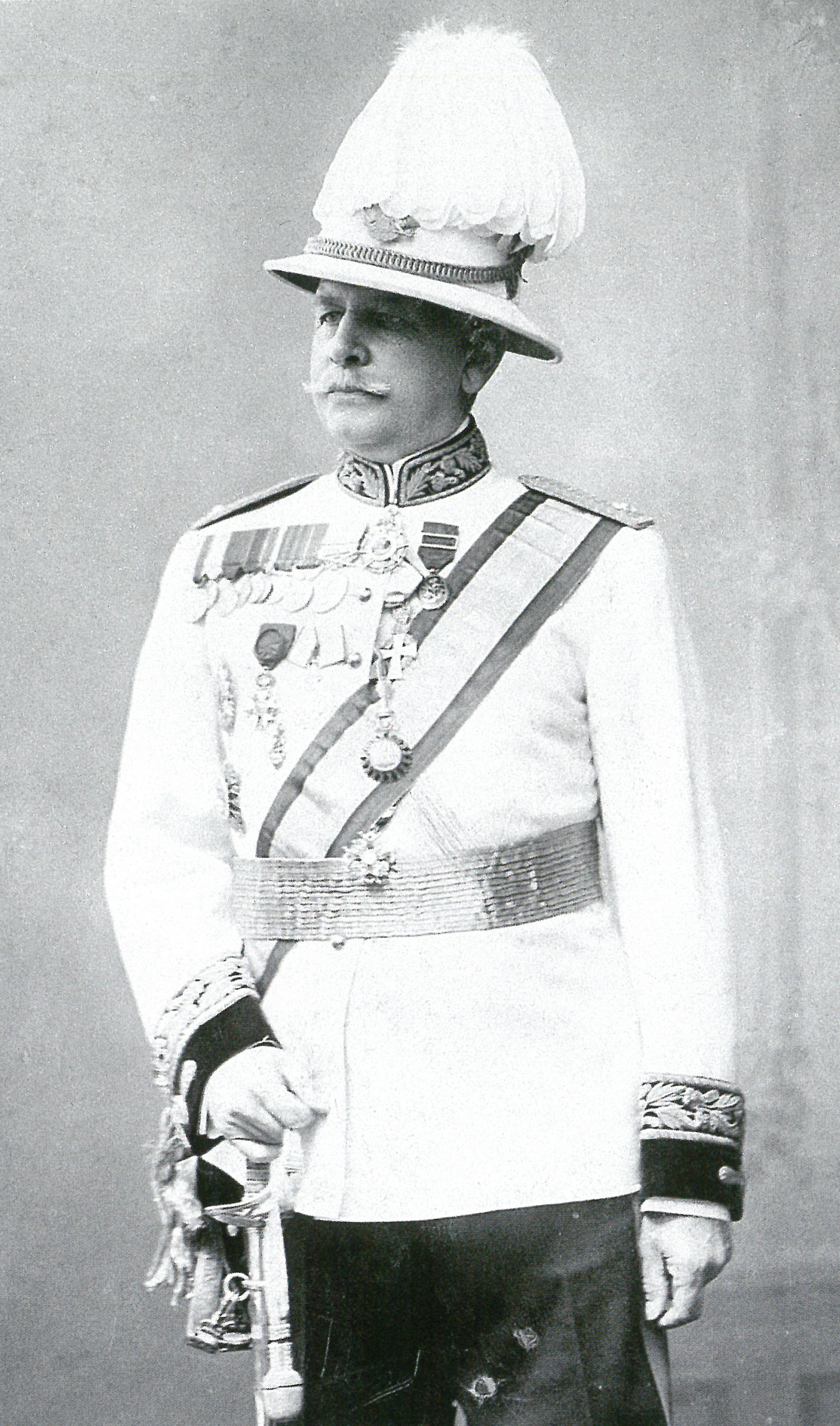
Gustav Schau

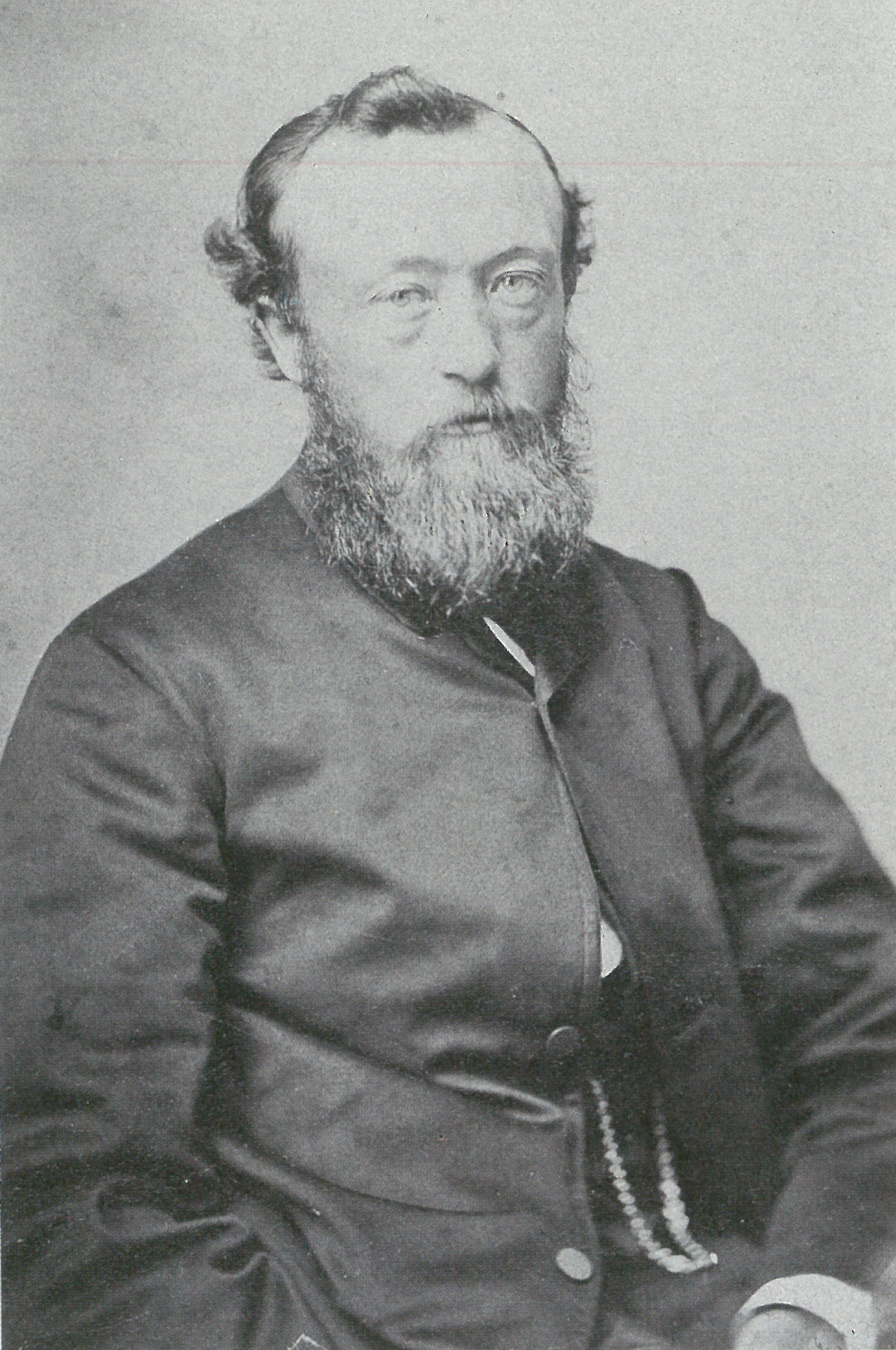
Frederik Kobke

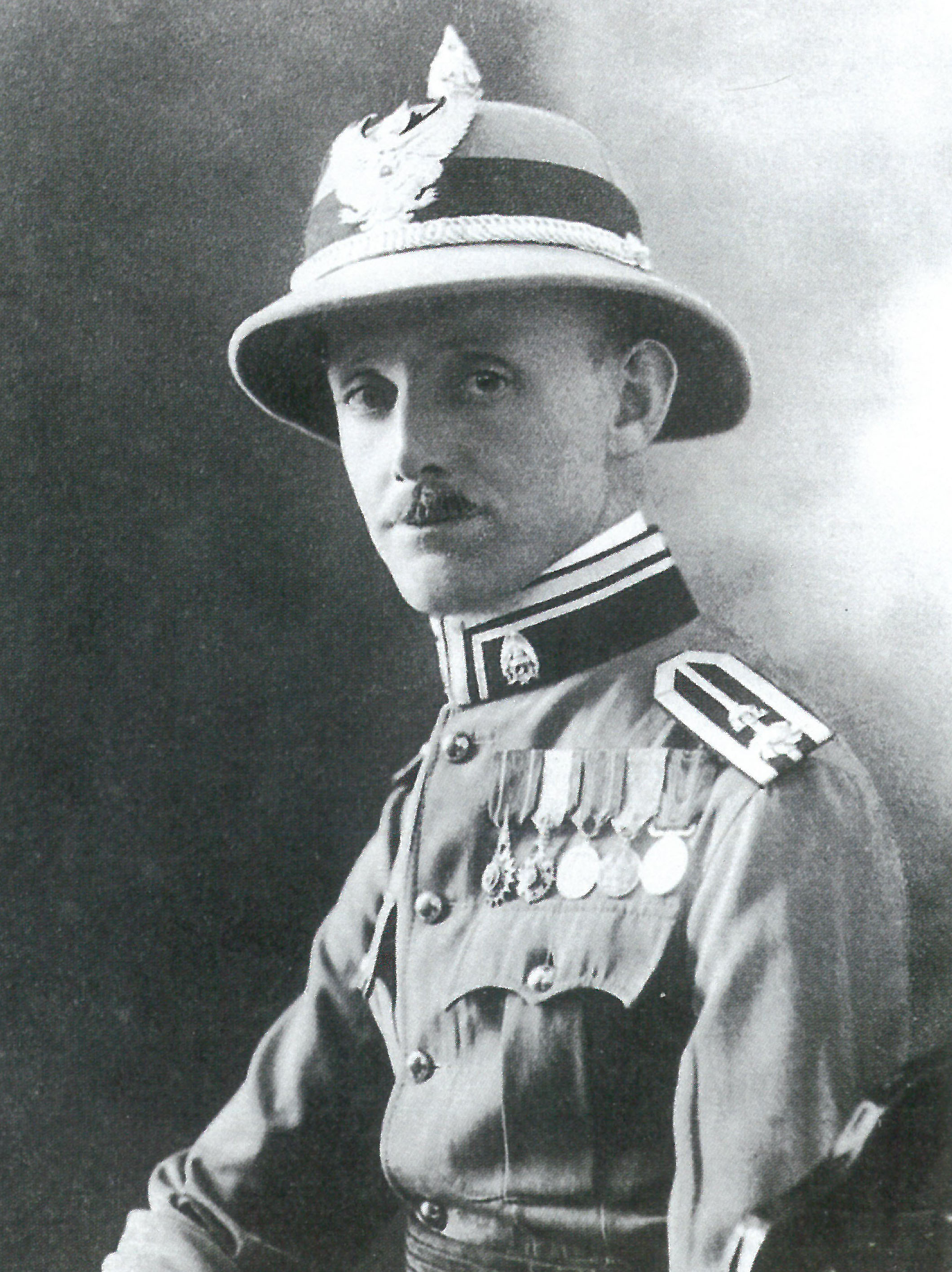
Erik Seidenfaden

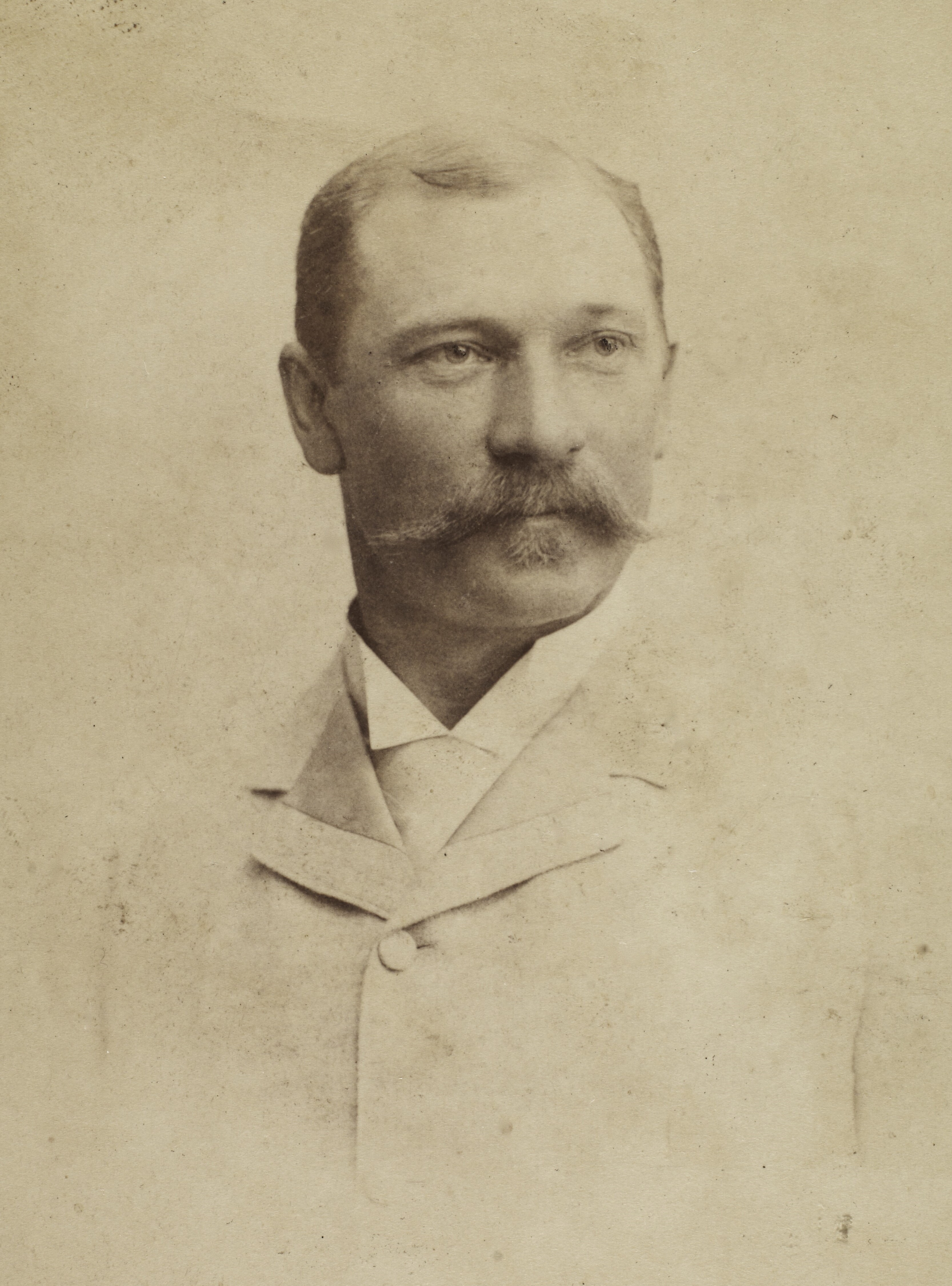
Hans Niels Andersen

=== Present ===
In 1955, Gunnar Seidenfaden was sent by the Danish Ministry of Foreign Affairs to Bangkok where he acquired a former Borneo company building for the purpose of an embassy on 29 July 1955. He subsequently served as the first Danish ambassador from 1955 to 1959.

In 2021, both Denmark and Thailand celebrated the 400 year anniversary of relations, with the Danish ambassador Jon Thorgaard opening an exhibition celebrating the anniversary at the Bangkok Art and Cultural Center.

== Trade and economy ==
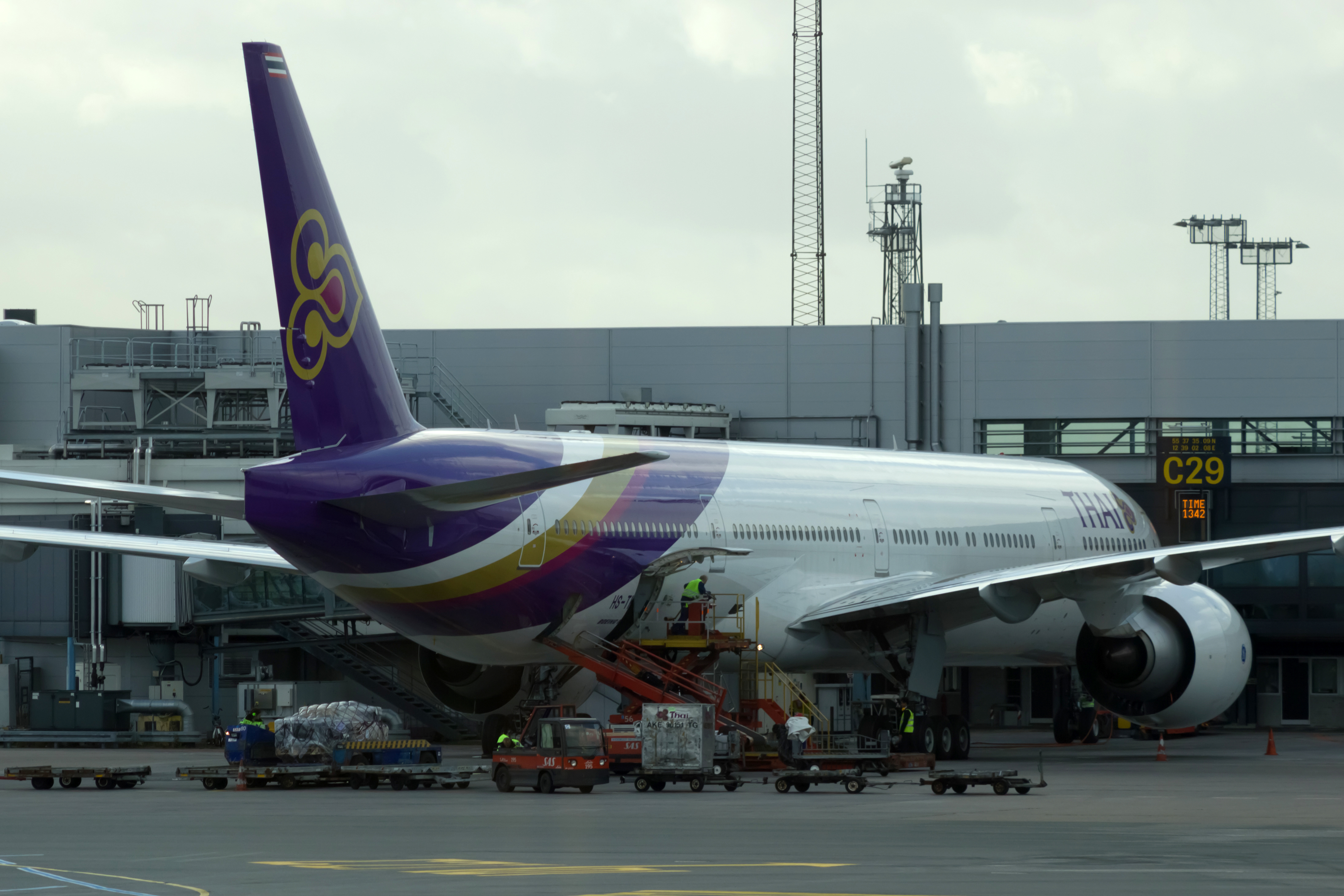
A Thai Airways aeroplane at Copenhagen airport in 2015

The biggest exports of Thailand to Denmark are jewelry, gems, footwear, kitchenware, household tables, electrical components and rubber product. Whereas the biggest exports of Denmark to Thailand were live animals, animal products, machinery, chemicals, medicine, scientific tools, and pharmaceutical objects. Numerous Danish companies have based regional production or headquarters in Thailand. Due to Bangkok and the central valley being prone to flooding, many of these companies operate across the country. Notable examples include Pandora which has operates in Bangkok since 1989 and in Lamphun since 2016; Royal Copenhagen in Saraburi; Georg Jensen in Chiang Mai and Bangkok

since 2019; Ecco in Ayutthaya since 1993; Danfoss in Bangkok since 1988; Grundfos in Bangkok since 1993; and Maersk since 1949 in Bangkok, Laem Chabang, Songkhla and Phuket. Danish companies Mountain Top and Linak Apac have also invested a total of 700 million Baht into the Eastern Economic Corridor. In Thailand, over 50,000 jobs are for Danish companies.

In Denmark, several Thai companies such as Central Group, Thai Airways International, Thoresen Thai, SVI Public, CPF food retailer, Team Precision Public Company and Blue Elephant restaurant, operate within Denmark.

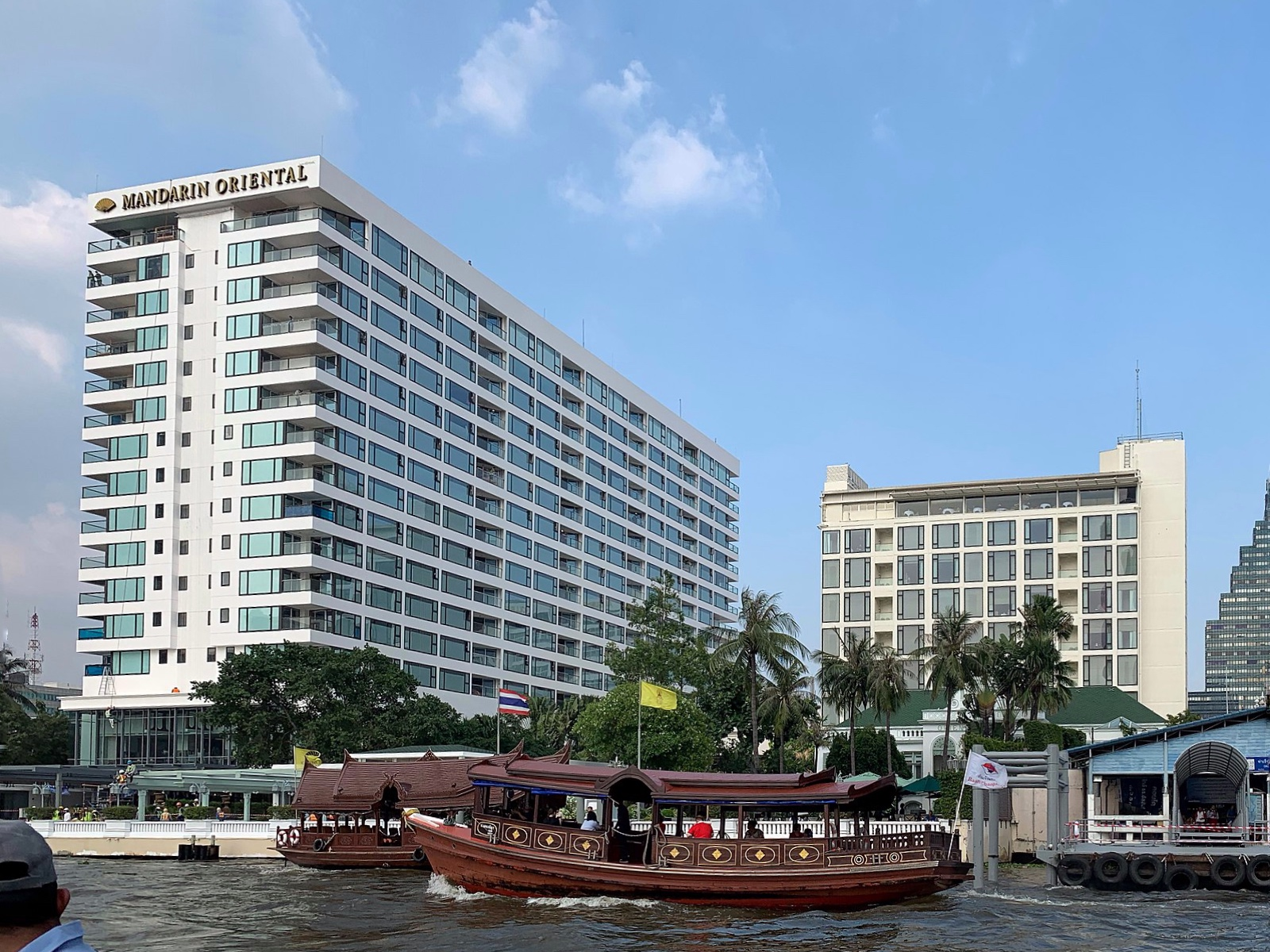
The Mandarin Oriental is a 5-star hotel first opened by Danish captains

Danish-Thai Chamber of Commerce (DTCC) is an organization that handles legal and business matters between Danes in Thailand. Established in 1992, it has over 100 companies as members of the DTCC and is the largest Danish Chamber of Commerce operating within ASEAN.

== Tourism and transportation ==
Thai Airways International operates the only direct route between Copenhagen Airport and Suvarnabhumi airport. Thailand often ranks as a popular tourist location for Scandinavia, including Denmark, due to its tropical climate and variety of activities. In 2006, Thailand was visited by 150,000 Danes, while in 2019 it was 159,526, about 2.75% of the Danish population. Danish tourism would bring Thailand US$443.93 million in 2019. Among Danes, Phuket and Bangkok ranked consistently among the top 10 most popular destinations for Danes. Phuket, Pattaya and Hua Hin are also popular among senior. A visa is not required for Danish citizens to enter into Thailand, although the allowed stay is 30 days.

== State and official visits ==
State and official visits to Denmark by a Thai royal
Dates	People	Locations	Itinerary
July 23–27, 1897	King Chulalongkorn, and other members of the royal family	Copenhagen and Zealand	Arrived in Copenhagen aboard the royal yacht Maha Chakri and was greeted by King Christian IX of Denmark. Resided at Amalienborg Palace and visited the Royal Danish Porcelain Factory where he brought back several porcelain pieces back to Siam. They toured several sites in Denmark with the Danish royal family. Part of his tour of the continent.
July 1–4, 1907	King Chulalongkorn	Zealand, Frederikshavn, SkagenGrenen, Århus	Arrived in Copenhagen and was invited by Frederik VIII for a gala dinner at Fredensborg Palace where he had a friendly interaction with the King and Queen. Also visited Andreas du Plessis de Richelieu and H.N Andersen residence in Denmark. Travelled to Århus to continue his tour of Europe in Norway.
June 24–29, 1934	King Prajadhipok and Queen Rambai Barni	Copenhagen	Following their visit to Germany, the King and Queen travelled to Copenhagen via Berlin Express where they were welcomed by Christian X. The two stayed at Hotel D’Angleterre in Copenhagen and attended dinners with the Danish royal family at Amalienborg, Bernstorff and Sorgenfri palaces. He also visited Hans Niels Anderson where the East Asiatic company arranged for them to continue their tour to Hamburg.
September 6–9, 1960	King Bhumibol Adulyadej and Queen Sirikit	Copenhagen	Arrived at Kastrup airport and were greeted by King Frederick IX, Queen Ingrid and other members of the Danish royal family. They resided at Fredensborg Palace and visited several sites, such as the Royal Column inside Roskilde Cathedral where Bhumibol had his name engraved on.
September 13–16, 1988	Crown Prince Maha Vajiralongkorn	Copenhagen, Jutland	At the request of Queen Margrethe II, Crown Prince Maha Vajiralongkorn flew to Kastrup airport and was welcomed by Prince Joachim and Crown Prince Frederik. He also attended a banquet at Fredensborg Palace before flying to Jutland to observe a NATO military operation.
2013	Princess Maha Chakri Sirindhorn	Copenhagen	Private visit where she visited Copenhagen zoo and named the new elephant born there, which was a descendant of elephants from Thailand.

State and official visits to Thailand by a Danish royal
Dates	People	Locations	Itinerary
January 12–24, 1962	King Frederick IX and Queen Ingrid	Bangkok, Chiang Mai, Saraburi province,	Arrived in Bangkok and were welcomed by King Bhumibol and Queen Rambai Barni at Don Muang Airport. They laid a wreath at the Victory Monument and visited Chaing Mai. With the Thai King and Queen, they were present at the opening of the Thai-Danish Dairy Farm in Saraburi province.
November, 1963	Princess Margrethe	Bangkok, Saraburi province and Ayutthaya	Visited the floating market and Wat Arun in Bangkok, as well as the East Asiatic company and Thai-Denmark Dairy farm in Saraburi province before visiting Ayutthaya.
February 7–12, 2001	Queen Margrethe II, Prince Consort Henrik, and Crown Prince Frederick	Bangkok, Chiang Mai, Mae Chaem	The 3 visited several development sites launched under Thai-Danish cooperation, as well as visiting several sites in Chiang Mai.
April 15–17, 2005	Crown Prince Frederick and Crown Princess Mary	Khao Lak, Phang Nga Province	Attended a memorial ceremony for Danish citizens killed in the 2004 Indian Ocean tsunami.
June 2006	Prince Consort Henrik	Bangkok	Attended the 60th anniversary of Bhumibol Adulyadej accession to the throne.
October 26, 2017	Crown Prince Frederick	Bangkok, Sanam Luang	Attended the Royal Cremation Ceremony of Bhumibol Adulyadej following his death.

== Diplomacy ==
=== Embassy ===
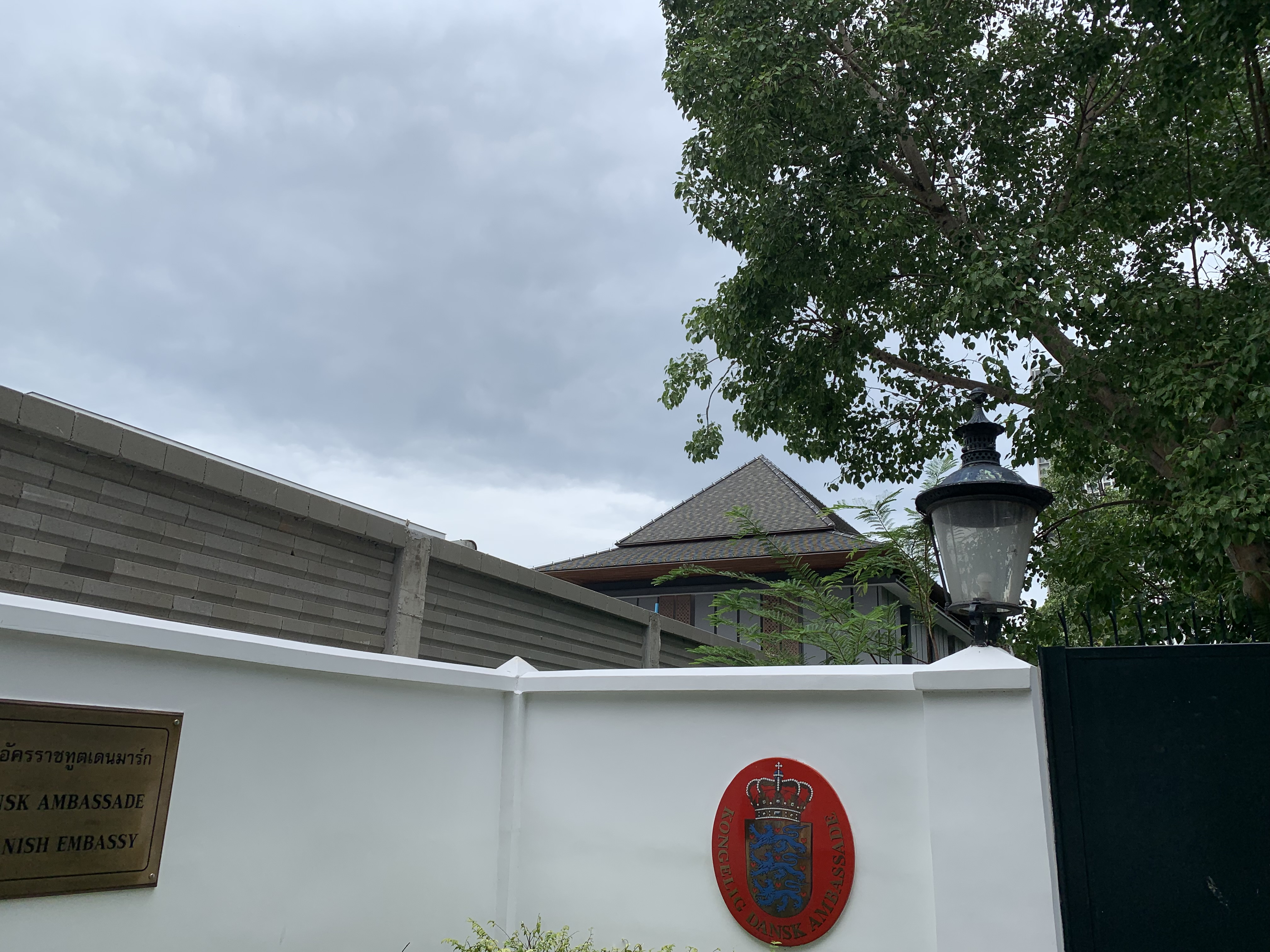
Embassy of Denmark, Bangkok

The current Danish embassy in Bangkok was built in former swamp land until its development by Sua Yom, who was wealthy Chinese merchant. The land was then parcelled and sold to Europeans and Thais, with the spot of the embassy being bought by the British Borneo company. It was later acquired by Denmark for the purpose of an embassy on 29 July 1955. Gunnar Siedenfaden served as the first ambassador and who helped acquire a park for the embassy. The embassy is situated next to the embassy of Germany, Luxembourg and Slovakia.

=== List of Ambassadors ===
==== Denmark to Thailand ====
Name	Photo	Appointed	Termination of mission	Comment
Gunnar Seidenfaden		1955	1959	First Danish ambassador to Thailand.
Frantz Howitz		1975	1979	Married local Thai Pensak Chagsuchinda, who became a senator in 2000.
Mikael Hemniti Winther		4 January 2011	September 2016	Also ambassador to Cambodia. Became ambassador to Bangladesh.
Uffe Wolfhechel		September 2016	January 2020	Was ambassador in Kabul.
Jon Thorgaard		25 September 2020	Incumbent	Also ambassador to Cambodia.

==== Thailand to Denmark ====
Royal Consulate-General

Name	Photo	Appointed	Termination of mission	Comment
Prince Prisadang Chumsai		1882	1887	First representative of Thailand to Denmark. Grandson of Rama III.
Phraya Dumrong Rajapolkarn		1888	1891	
Phraya Nontaburi Srikasetraram		1892	1909	
Phraya Visutr Kosa		1910		
Phraya Sri Damasasana		1910	1913	
Prince Devawongse Varodaya		1914	1918	Also the ambassador to Germany at the same time from 1913 to 1917.
Phraya Visan Bochanakich		1919	1923	
Prince Vipulaya Savasdiwongse Sawaddiwatana		1924	1929	
Damras Damrong Dhevakula		1929	1930	
Prince Pridi Debyabongs Dhevakula		1930	1931	
Prince Dumras Dumrong Dhevakula		1932		
Phraya Supan Sombat		1933	1935	
Phraya Rajavangsan		1935	1939	
Phra Manu-vejvimolnat		1940		Note: Due to the German invasion of Denmark and World War II, the consulate was closed from 1940 to 1946
Prince Nakkatra Mangala		1947	1950	
Phra Bahiddha Nukar		1950	1954	
Khun Bipidh Virajjakarn		1954		

Royal Thai Embassy

Name	Appointed	Termination of mission	Comment
Khun Bipidh Virajjakarn	1958	1961	First ambassador to Denmark.
Prince Gustavas Chakrabandh	1962	1966	
Vivadh Na Pombejre	1967	1971	
Prince Prem Purachatra	1972	1975	
Micha Dhitavat	1975	1976	
Chet Navarat	1977	1980	
Kamol Kaosayananda	1981	1983	
Sathit Sathirathaya	1984	1990	
Tongchan Jotikasthira	1990	1991	
Chawan Chawanid	1991	1994	
Rangsan Phaholyothin	1994	1997	
Apiphong Jayanama	1997	2001	
Adisak Panupong	2001	2005	
Chaisiri Anamarn	2005	2007	
Cholchineepan Chiranond	24 January 2008	2010	Was also the Thai ambassador to Lithuania and Iceland at the same time, and also the first female Thai ambassador to Denmark.
Piyawat Niyomrerks	2011	2012	
Vimon Kidchob	2012	2017	
Vichit Chitvimarn	2018	2020	
Sirilak Niyom	2020	2024	
Suphanvasa Chotikajan Tang	2025	Incumbent	

== Food ==
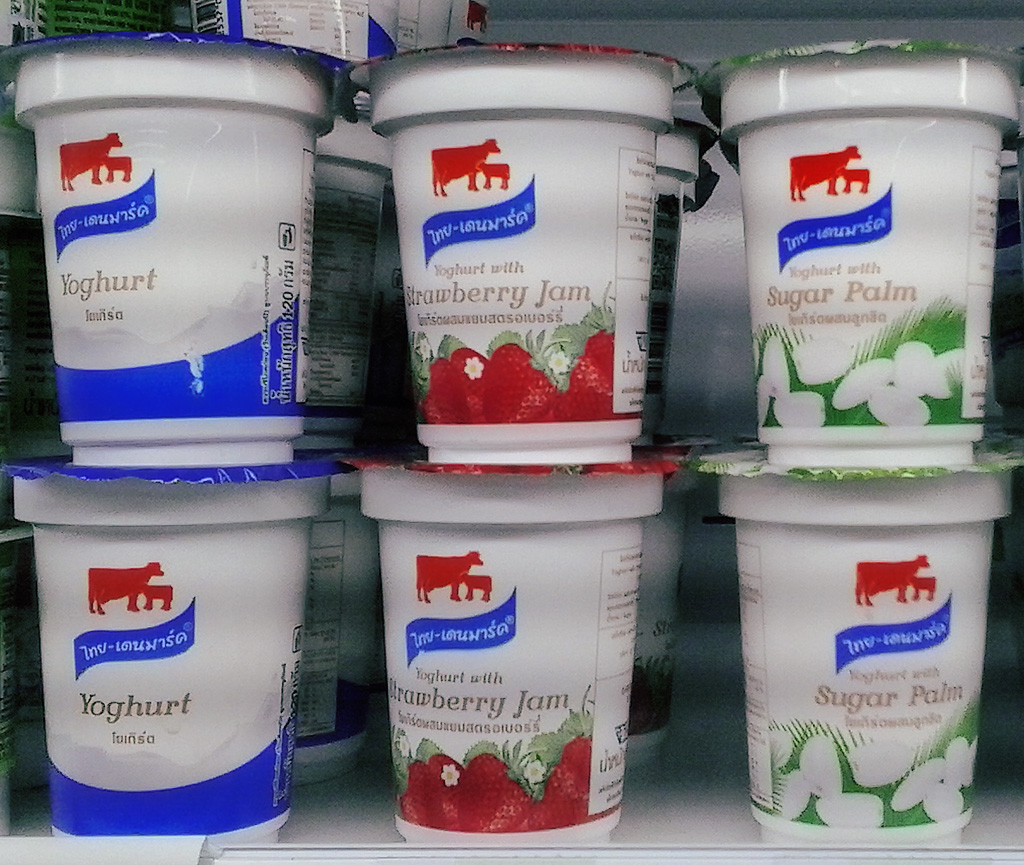
Thai-Denmark yoghurt

In 1960, King Bhumibol Adulyadej of Thailand visited Denmark where he showed an interest in the Danish dairy industry and constructed the Thai-Danish Dairy Farm (Dansk-Thailandsk Kvæglandbrug) in Muak Lek district, Saraburi, which was opened by Bhumibol and Frederick IX on 16 January 1962. Meanwhile, Gunnars Søndergaard and the Danish Farmer's Association gave 160 cattles to Thailand. However, Danish cattle could not handle the climate and environment of Thailand and began dying. They were later replaced by Danish cattle bred with local or Pakistani cattle. The Danish farm would prove itself as fundamental to the development of the Thai dairy industry.

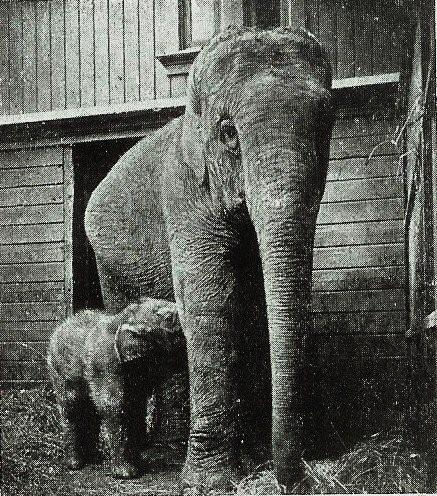
Copenhagen zoo in 1907: shown are mother Ellen and her 1 day old son Kaspar. Kaspar is the son of Thai elephant 'Chang'.

== Wildlife ==
In 1878, Frederik Købke who was the Danish consul in Bangkok, brought two elephants named 'Chang' and 'Eng' from Siam as a present to Copenhagen Zoo. Two more elephants were gifted to the zoo in 1896 by Andreas du Plessis de Richelieu. In 1962, King Bhumibol Adulyadej and Queen Sirkit presented two elephants - including one called 'Chiang Mai' - to King Frederick IX and Queen Ingrid during their 1962 visit, and again in 2001 they presented two elephants to Queen Margrethe II and Prince Consort Henrik. Also in 2001, the people of Surin province gifted an elephant to Denmark. On 31 May 2012, Copenhagen Zoo celebrated the 50 year jubilee of the arrival of the first elephants to Denmark. It was presided over by Prince Henrik, along with his 4 of his grandchildren. On 28 June 2017, Chiang Mai died at age 58 from old age. Before his death, he was considered the oldest elephant in Europe after fathering dozens of elephants across Europe.

== Culture ==
In 2023, there are 12,448 Thai immigrations in Denmark and they make up the 19th largest immigrant group in Denmark. Generally, most Thais in Denmark are the wives of Danish men while 2,000 Thais live in Copenhagen. Across Denmark operate numerous Thai cultural organizations, such as the Rak Thai association which has the aim of promoting the Thai language to descendants of Thai immigrants. Also around Denmark operate several Buddhist temples founded by Asian immigrants. Introduced by Thai immigrants, Muay Thai has become a popular sport among young Danes with the Danish Muaythai Federation being founded in 2002. As part of the "Global Thai programme", 200 Thai restaurants operate in Denmark, with 88 of these in Copenhagen.

== See also ==
- Foreign relations of Denmark
- Foreign relations of Thailand
- Andreas du Plessis de Richelieu (1852–1932), a Danish naval officer and businessman who became a Siamese admiral and minister of the navy.
