= List of ambassadors of Thailand to Germany =

Coordinates: 52.460666°N 13.316669°E

Ambassador of Thailand to Germany
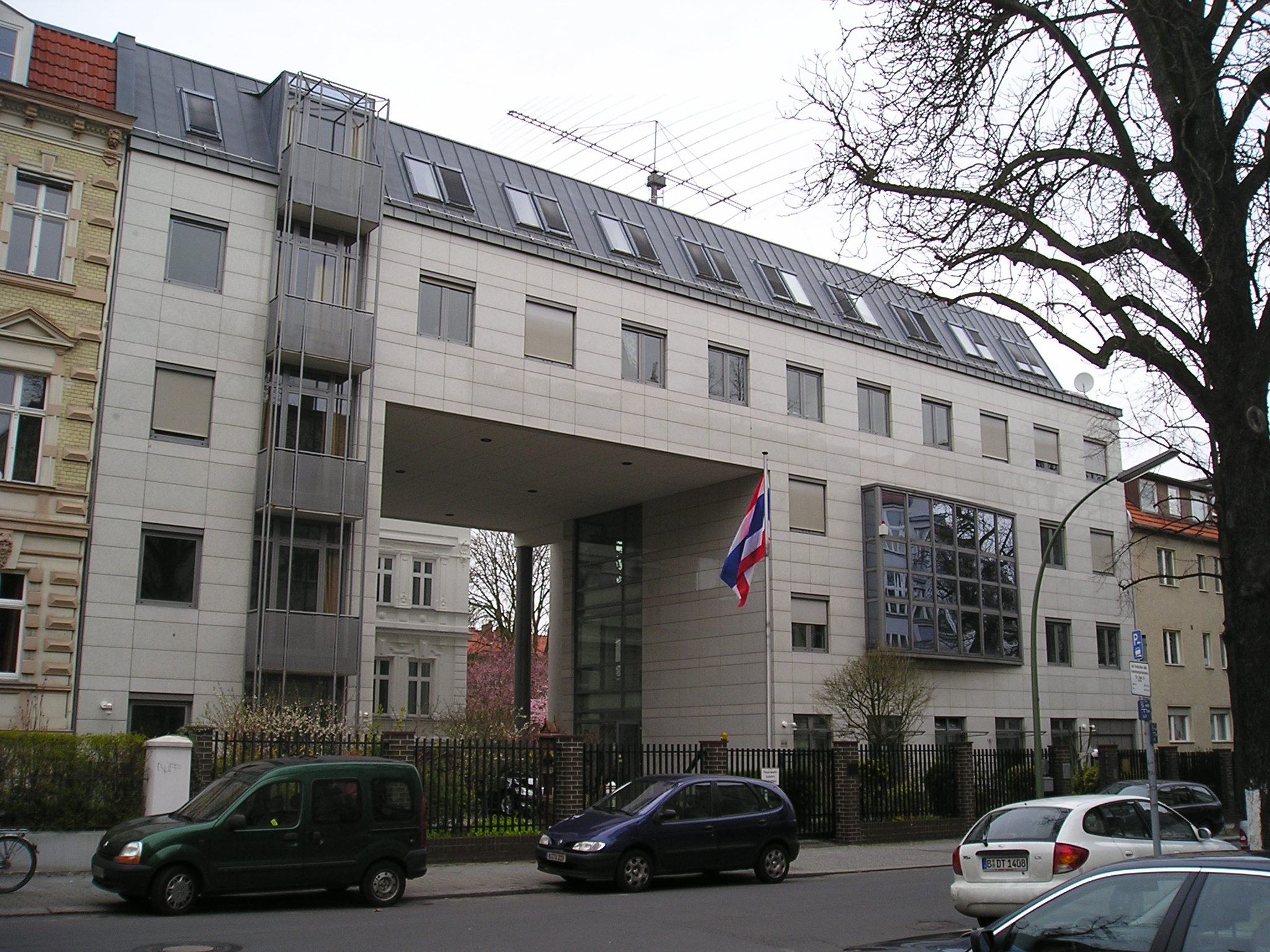
- Incumbent; Chittipat Thongprasroeth since February 26, 2025
- Inaugural holder: Prince Prisdang
- Formation: 1883

The Thai Ambassador in Berlin is the official representative of the Government in Bangkok to the Government of Germany.

== List of representatives ==
Diplomatic agreement/designated/Diplomatic accreditation	Buddhist calendar	Ambassador Marquess = Phya	Thai language	Observations	List of prime ministers of Thailand	Chancellor of Germany	Term end	Buddhist calendar
1883				Diplomatic relations began in London.	Chulalongkorn	Otto von Bismarck		
1883	2426	Prince Prisdang	หม่อมเจ้าปฤษฎางค์ ชุมสาย (พระวรวงศ์เธอ พระองค์เจ้าปฤษฎางค์)		Chulalongkorn	Otto von Bismarck	1887	2430
1887				Opening of the Minister's office in Berlin.	Chulalongkorn	Otto von Bismarck		
1887	2430	Marquis Maha Yotha	พระยาดำรงค์ราชพลขันธ์ (พระยามหาโยธา - นกแก้ว คชเสนี)		Chulalongkorn	Otto von Bismarck	1891	2434
1891	2434	Phya Krai Kosa	พระยานนทบุรีศรีเกษตราราม		Chulalongkorn	Leo von Caprivi	1901	2444
1902	2444	Phya Visute Kosa	พระยาวิสูตรโกษา (ฟัก สาณเสน)		Chulalongkorn	Bernhard von Bülow	1906	2449
1906	2449	Phra Sri Dhamasasana	พระยาศรีธรรมศาส์น (พระยาสุวรรณศิริ - ทองดี สุวรรณศิริ		Chulalongkorn	Bernhard von Bülow	1913	2456
1913	2456	Prince Traidos Prabandh	หม่อมเจ้าไตรทศประพันธ์ เทวกุล (พระวรวงศ์เธอ กรมหมื่นเทววงศ์วโรทัย)		Vajiravudh	Theobald von Bethmann Hollweg	1917	2460
July 22, 1917				Thailand declared war, suspended diplomatic relations and closed the office in Berlin, Protecting power was Denmark.	Vajiravudh	Georg Michaelis		
1925				Thailand established diplomatic relations with Germany and re-opened the ministry in Berlin	Prajadhipok	Hans Luther		
1925	2468	Prince Damras Damrong	หม่อมเจ้าดำรัสดำรงค์ เทวกุล		Prajadhipok	Hans Luther	1928	2471
1928	2471	Prince Vipulya Svastivongs	หม่อมเจ้าวิบูลย์สวัสดิ์วงศ์ สวัสดิกุล	*Former Thai Ambassador to Denmark	Prajadhipok	Hermann Müller (politician)	1929	2472
1929	2472	Prince Damras Damrong	หม่อมเจ้าดำรัสดำรงค์ เทวกุล		Prajadhipok	Hermann Müller (politician)	October 1930	2473
1930	2473	Prince Pridi Debyabongs Devakula	พลตรี หม่อมเจ้าปรีดิเทพย์พงศ์ เทวกุล		Prajadhipok	Heinrich Brüning	1931	2474
1933	2476	Phya Subarn Sompati	พระยาสุพรรณสมบัติ (ติน บุนนาค)		Phraya Phahon Phonphayuhasena	Adolf Hitler	1935	2478
1935	2478	Phra Sundara Vachana	พลเรือโท พระยาราชวังสัน (ศรี กมลนาวิน)	Charge d Affairs, Neurath empfangt Phra Sundara Vachana zur Entgegennahme seines Einführungsschreibens als Geschäftsträger der neu errichteten siamesischen Gesandtschaft.	Phraya Phahon Phonphayuhasena	Adolf Hitler	1937	2480
1937				Opening of the mission in Berlin.	Phraya Phahon Phonphayuhasena	Adolf Hitler		
1937	2480	Phra Sundara Vachana	พระสุนทรวาจนา (สุนทร สาลักษณ์)		Phraya Phahon Phonphayuhasena	Adolf Hitler		
1938	2481	Phra Prasasana Bhidyayudha	พลตรี ประศาสน์ ชูถิ่น (พระประศาสน์พิทยายุทธ)		Phibul Songkhram	Adolf Hitler		
1953				The Minister of State opened the Thai mission at Bonn (West Germany).	Plaek Phibunsongkhram	Konrad Adenauer		
1953	2496	Luang Chamnannitikasetra (Uthal Saengmanee)	หลวงชำนาญนิติเกษตร (อุทัย แสงมณี)		Plaek Phibunsongkhram	Konrad Adenauer	1956	2499
1956	2499	Luang Chamnannitikasetra (Uthal Saengmanee)			Plaek Phibunsongkhram	Konrad Adenauer	1959	2502
1959	2502	Direk Jayanama	th:ดิเรก ชัยนาม	ambassador to Japan during World War II	Sarit Dhanarajata	Konrad Adenauer	1965	2508
1965	2508	Konthi Suphamongkhon	กนต์ธีร์ ศุภมงคล		Thanom Kittikachorn	Ludwig Erhard	1970	2513
1970	2513	Chintana Kunjara Na Ayudhya	จินตน์ กุญชร ณ อยุธยา	Colonel	Thanom Kittikachorn	Willy Brandt	1973	2516
1973	2516	Upadit Pachariyangkun	อุปดิศร์ ปาจรียางกูร	Foreign Minister	Sanya Dharmasakti	Willy Brandt	1976	2519
1976	2519	Phan Wannamethee	แผน วรรณเมธี	From July 16, 1984 – July 15, 1986 he was Secretary General of ASEAN.	Seni Pramoj	Helmut Schmidt	1977	2520
1977	2520	Anand Panyarachun	th:อานันท์ ปันยารชุน		Kriangsak Chomanan	Helmut Schmidt	1979	2522
1979	2522	Sudhee Prasavinitchai	สุธี ประศาสน์วินิจฉัย		Kriangsak Chomanan	Helmut Schmidt	1982	2525
1982	2525	Kosol Sindhvananda	โกศล สินธวานนท์		Prem Tinsulanonda	Helmut Kohl	1987	2530
1987	2530	Sakol Vanabriksha	สากล วรรณพฤกษ์	1972 to 1976 he was Tai Ambassador to Canada.	Prem Tinsulanonda	Helmut Kohl	1993	2536
1993	2536	Praphol Narinthrangura	ประพจน์ นรินทรางกูร ณ อยุธยา	na Ayutthaya indicates this distant royal ancestry.	Suchinda Kraprayoon	Helmut Kohl	1996	2539
1997	2540	Kasit Piromya	th:กษิต ภิรมย์		Chuan Leekpai	Helmut Kohl	2001	2544
August 1, 1999				The Royal Thai embassy moved from Bonn to Berlin.	Chuan Leekpai	Gerhard Schröder		
2001	2544	Surapong Jayanama		younger brother of Asda Jayanama	Thaksin Shinawatra	Gerhard Schröder	2003	2546
2003	2546	Cholchineepan Chiranond	ชลชินีพันธุ์ ชีรานนท์		Thaksin Shinawatra	Gerhard Schröder	2007	2550
2007	2550	Sorayouth Prompoj	สรยุตม์ พรหมพจน์		Surayud Chulanont	Angela Merkel	2009	2552
2009	2552	Charivat Santaputra	จริย์วัฒน์ สันตะบุตร		Samak Sundaravej	Angela Merkel	2011	2555
2011	2555	Nongnuth Phetcharatana	นงนุช เพ็ชรรัตน์		Yingluck Shinawatra	Angela Merkel	2016	2559
August 29, 2016	2560	Dhiravat Bhumichitr		(*July 12, 1960)	Yingluck Shinawatra	Angela Merkel	April 7, 2022	2565
April 7, 2022	2565	Nadhavathna Krishnamra	ณัฐวัฒน์ กฤษณามระ	Later Ambassador of Thailand to the United Kingdom (from 2025).	Prayut Chan-o-cha	Olaf Scholz	February 26, 2025	2568
February 26, 2025	2568	Chittipat Thongprasroeth	จิตติพัฒน์ ทองประเสริฐ		Paetongtarn Shinawatra	Olaf Scholz		
