= Chulalongkorn European visits =

King Chulalongkorn's two visits to Europe in 1897 and 1907

Chulalongkorn's visits to Europe were two visits to Europe made by King Chulalongkorn (Rama V), monarch of Siam, in 1897 and 1907. The first was an official visit whose purposes included diplomacy, the study of European statecraft, and the advancement of Siam's standing in the international community. The second was more private in character, with the principal purposes of medical treatment and rest; nevertheless, the King continued to meet monarchs and other prominent figures and to observe political, economic, technological, artistic, and cultural developments in Europe.

Both visits took place during the era of imperialism, when Siam faced pressure from the expansion of the United Kingdom and the French Republic. Following the Franco-Siamese crisis of 1893, Chulalongkorn's personal relationships with European dynasties—particularly the Russian, German, and British courts—were therefore significant to Siam's place within the international network of royal courts. Historians, however, do not regard the visits as the sole reason Siam preserved its independence. After the first visit, Siam still entered into several agreements ceding or exchanging rights and territories with France and Britain.

== Background ==
Siam lost its territory on the left-bank of the Mekong River under the Franco-Siamese Treaty of 1893

Before 1897, King Chulalongkorn had already travelled outside the kingdom, visiting Singapore and Java in 1871, British India in 1872, and Singapore again in 1896. These journeys allowed him to observe Western colonial administration, transport, military affairs, and public institutions.

In the late nineteenth century, Siam was centralising authority and reforming its administrative system while facing competition between the British Empire in Burma and Malaya and the French Empire in Indochina. The Franco-Siamese crisis of 1893 forced Siam to recognise French authority over territories on the left bank of the Mekong, while France occupied Chanthaburi as a guarantee. Britain and France subsequently issued a joint declaration on 15 January 1896, undertaking that neither would seek special privileges in the Chao Phraya basin without the other's consent. The declaration, however, did not guarantee Siam's territorial integrity in all its peripheral regions.

The King's memorandum on the objectives of his first visit mentioned establishing friendly relations with European monarchs, making Siam better known, studying administration, law, military affairs, and education, and improving relations with France after the crisis of 1893. Historians have therefore described the journey both as a diplomatic mission and as an educational Grand Tour, rather than merely tourism or an attempt to demonstrate that Siam was “not barbarous”.

== Overview ==
Visit	Dates	Character and principal purposes	Regent	Principal royal writings
First	7 April–16 December 1897	Official visits, diplomacy, observation of European states and societies, and improvement of relations with the great powers	Queen Saovabha Phongsri	Private royal letters sent to the regent
Second	27 March–17 November 1907	A private journey for medical treatment and rest, together with meetings and observation of European affairs	Crown Prince Vajiravudh	Royal letters later collected and published as Klai Ban

== First visit ==
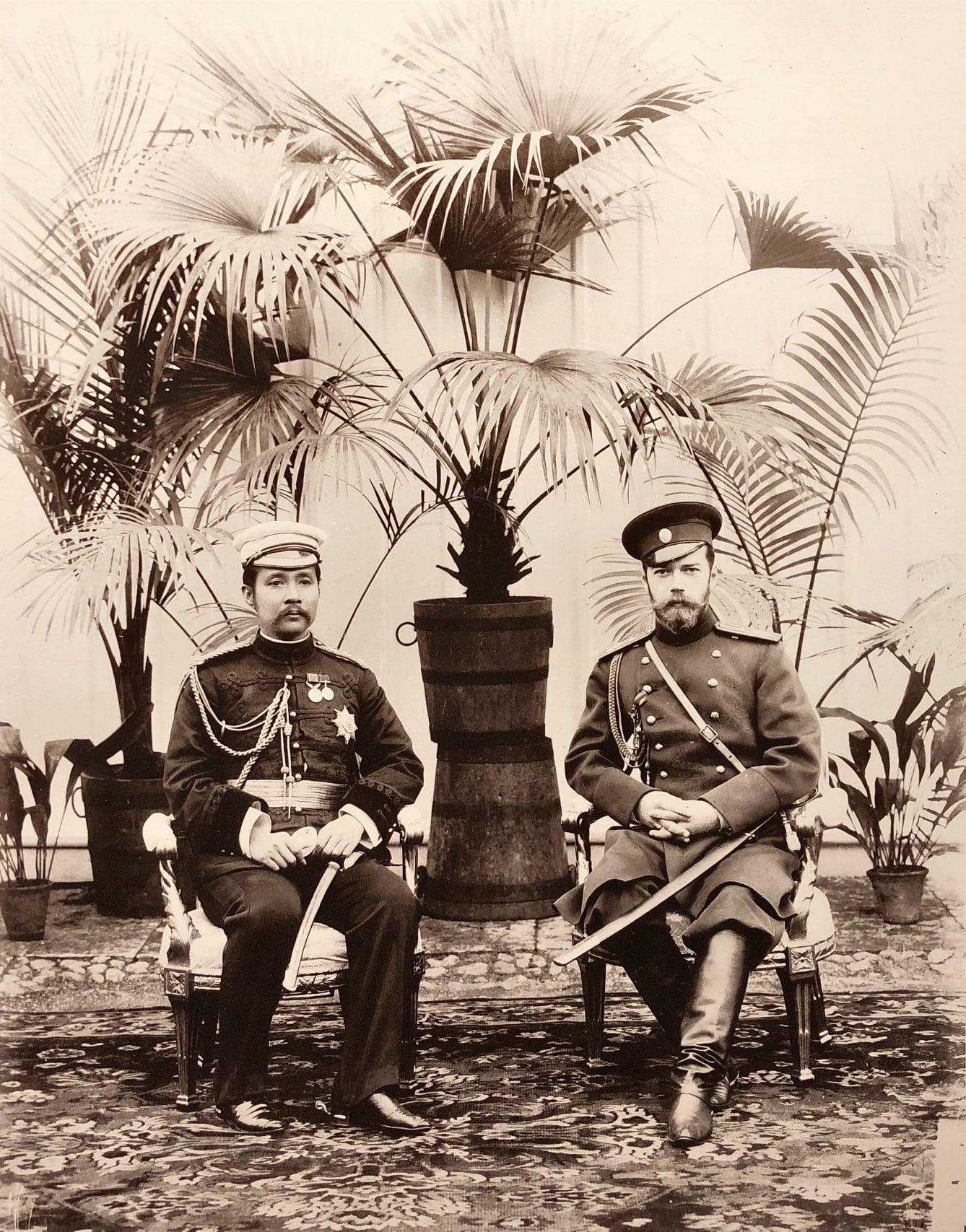
King Chulalongkorn with Emperor Nicholas II of Russia at the Peterhof Palace, 1897

Chulalongkorn departed from Ratchaworadit Pier on 7 April 1897 aboard the royal yacht Maha Chakri. During his absence from the kingdom, he appointed Queen Saovabha Phongsri as regent. Therefore, she became the first woman to perform that office in Siam and was known contemporaneously as the “Queen Regent”.

The royal yacht called at Singapore, Colombo in British Ceylon, and Aden before passing through the Suez Canal into the Mediterranean. Chulalongkorn reached Venice in the Kingdom of Italy in May. He then passed through or visited thirteen sovereign European states, according to the political boundaries of the time: the Kingdom of Italy, the Swiss Confederation, Austria-Hungary, the Russian Empire, Sweden–Norway, the Kingdom of Denmark, the United Kingdom of Great Britain and Ireland, the German Empire, the Kingdom of the Netherlands, the Kingdom of Belgium, the French Third Republic, the Kingdom of Portugal, and the Kingdom of Spain. He subsequently returned to Italy and began his homeward journey.

During the journey, the King met and conversed with numerous monarchs and heads of state, including Umberto I of Italy, Pope Leo XIII, Emperor Franz Joseph I, Emperor Nicholas II, King Oscar II of Sweden and Norway, King Christian IX of Denmark, Queen Victoria, Emperor Wilhelm II, and French president Félix Faure. Encounters between a non-European monarch and European dynasties were important in the diplomatic culture of the period: court ceremony, decorations, reciprocal visits, and joint photographs helped communicate the equal sovereign status of the rulers of independent states. The photograph of Chulalongkorn with Nicholas II at Peterhof was circulated in Europe and became an important image of Siamese–Russian relations. At the time, Crown Prince Vajiravudh was already studying in Britain and joined the reception of his father during the King's stay in the United Kingdom at the time of Queen Victoria's Diamond Jubilee.

Relations with France were more delicate than those with the European monarchies because of the continuing effects of the 1893 crisis. The Paris visit therefore included an official reception, a meeting with President Faure, and severe criticism in some sections of the press. Royal letters sent to Queen Saovabha reflected the King's anxiety about visiting France.

Chulalongkorn returned to Bangkok on 16 December 1897, 253 days after his departure. He later elevated Queen Saovabha Phongsri to the rank of Queen in recognition of her service as regent.

== Second visit ==
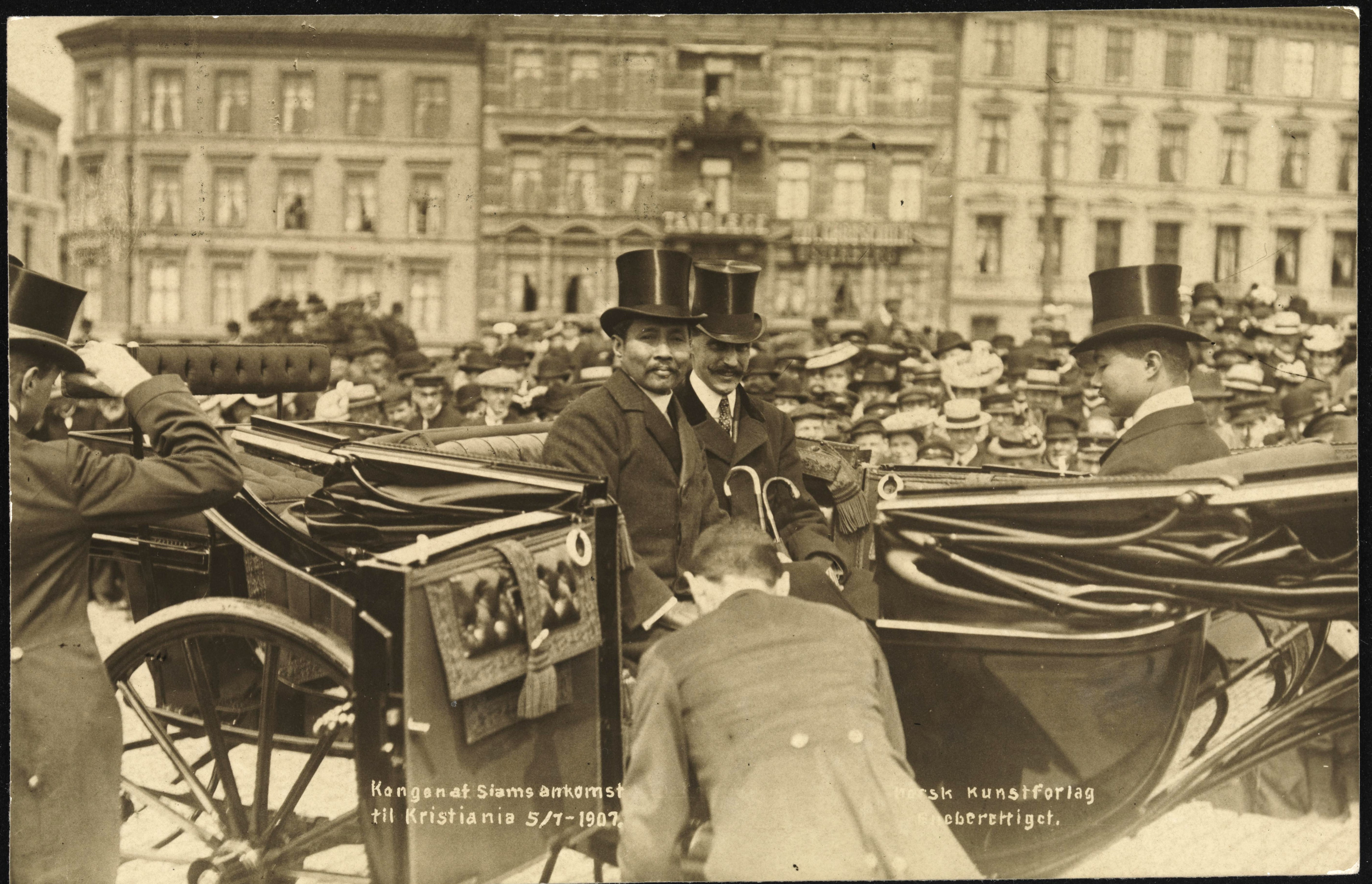
King Chulalongkorn arriving in Christiania, Kingdom of Norway, on 5 July 1907

The second visit began when Chulalongkorn departed from Ratchaworadit Pier on 27 March 1907 and ended with his return to Bangkok on 17 November 1907. (Note: Under the Rattanakosin Era calendar then used in Siam, the year changed on 1 April; 27 March fell in R.S. 125 and 17 November in R.S. 126.) The entourage was smaller and the journey more private in character. Its principal purposes were rest and medical treatment on the advice of physicians. The King consulted doctors and underwent treatment in European spa towns, including Bad Homburg vor der Höhe in the German Empire.

During the King's absence, Crown Prince Vajiravudh served as regent. The journey through Italy, Switzerland, Germany, France, Britain, Belgium, Denmark, Norway, and Sweden combined rest and medical treatment with visits to places and institutions and meetings with monarchs, members of royal families, politicians, bankers, industrialists, and artists. In Denmark, Chulalongkorn stayed at Bernstorff Palace and continued to Jutland, reaching Skagen on 4 July before travelling onward to Norway.

Before the second visit, the Franco-Siamese Treaty of 1907 had been signed in Bangkok on 23 March 1907 by representatives of Siam and France. Under its principal provisions, France withdrew from Trat and Dan Sai, while Siam recognised French authority over Battambang, Siem Reap, and Sisophon. Relations with France, the raising of finance for the Southern Railway, and the commissioning of French artists to produce the equestrian statue of Chulalongkorn were matters associated with the period of the journey, but should be distinguished from its principal medical purpose.

Throughout the journey, Chulalongkorn wrote royal letters to his daughter Princess Nibha Nobhadol, who served as his private secretary. The letters recorded the route, events, people, places, medical treatment, and observations on European society. Princess Nibha later collected and published them under the title Klai Ban. The work is therefore an important primary source for the second visit.

== Importance ==
The first visit brought Chulalongkorn into direct contact with European heads of state and royal courts and increased Siam's visibility in the European public sphere through court ceremonies, newspaper reports, photography, and illustrated publications. Dynastic relations did not replace negotiations between governments, but provided an additional channel through which Siam could present itself as an independent state whose monarch participated in the same diplomatic order as European dynasties. His observation of European institutions, transport, military affairs, education, public health, industry, and resource management was connected to his interest in domestic reform.

The reform of Siam's administration and institutions, however, had begun before 1897 and resulted from multiple factors; the European visits were not the origin of all such reforms. Likewise, the two visits formed only one part of Siam's foreign policy efforts to preserve its room for manoeuvre and did not immediately end imperial pressure. After 1897, Siam concluded treaties with France in 1904 and 1907 and the Anglo-Siamese Treaty of 1909 with Britain. Assessment of the visits must therefore take into account domestic reform, government diplomacy, foreign advisers, and rivalry among the great powers in the region.

== See also ==
- Klai Ban
- 1897 visit by Chulalongkorn to Europe
- Franco-Siamese crisis of 1893
- France–Thailand relations
- Russia–Thailand relations
- Rattanakosin Era
