= 1897 visit by Chulalongkorn to Europe =

Siamese diplomatic mission to Europe

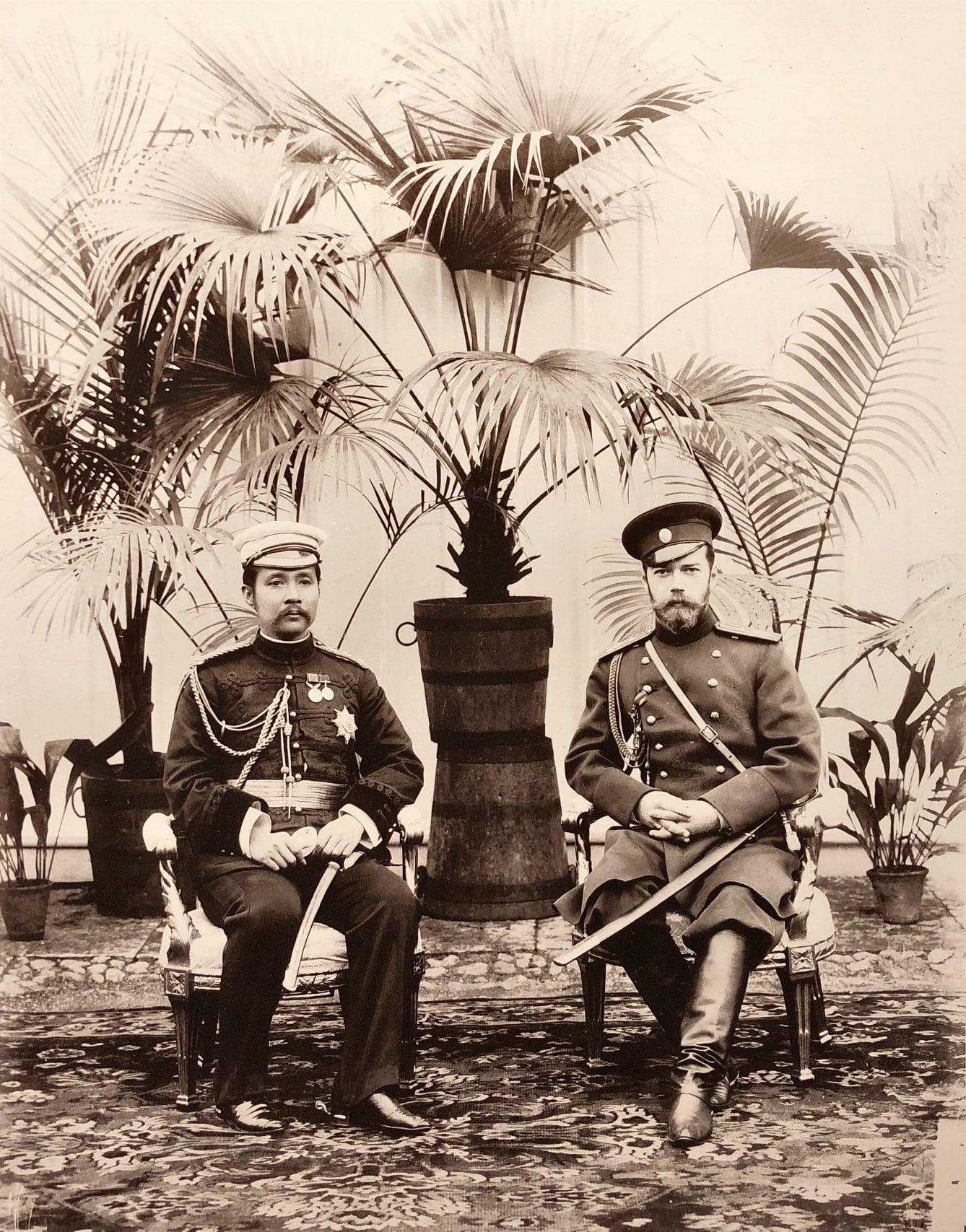
Chulalongkorn with Tsar Nicholas II of Russia in Saint Petersburg during his tour.

In 1897, Chulalongkorn, King of Siam embarked on a multination tour across Europe as the first Siamese king to the continent. Called his first grand tour, Chulalongkorn visited in total 14 nations, meeting their respective leaders and monarchs.

Prior to the tour, Siam had faced territorial losses to British and French colonial ambitions in the region. In particular, relations with France had deteriorated as they pushed west, most notably in the 1893 Franco-Siamese crisis. To ensure Siam's continued independence and modernisation, Chulalongkorn decided to embark on the tour, which lasted from April to December. Using the royal yacht Maha Chakri, Chulalongkorn visited the monarchs and royal families of several nations. Out of these nations, Russia, Germany, Britain and France were of particular interest. Chulalongkorn's ability to speak English proved a great advantage. He embarked on a second tour of the continent in 1907, albeit on a smaller and more private scale.

== Background and reasoning ==
Map of Siamese territorial losses to France following the 1893 Franco-Siamese crisis.

Under Chulalongkorn's father and predecessor, Mongkut, Siam began to modernise in the face of British and French colonial ambitions in the region. British colonial ambitions laid in Burma and Malaya, whilst French ambitions were in Indochina. For both, Siam had to cede land that was under its influence. In 1893, Siam experienced a short crisis with France, deteriorating relations between the two. Additionally, the crisis resulted in the French occupation of the ethnically Siamese province of Chanthaburi. In 1896, Britain and France signed a joint declaration where Siamese independence and sovereignty over the Chao Phraya river basin was guaranteed. The declaration, however, did not guarantee continued Siamese control over its more frontier provinces.

In a memorandum, Chulalongkorn outlined the three motives behind his 1897 tour. They were a wish to establish friendly relations with European monarchs and make Siam known to the continent and world; study Europe's administration, legal system, military and education and how they could be applied to Siam; and to repair Siam's relations with France after the 1893 crisis. In Maurizio Peleggi's Lords of Things: The Fashioning of the Siamese Monarchy's Modern Image published by the University of Hawai'i Press, Chulalongkorn motives are alternatively said to a wish to first study European life, how wealth and goods originate, the strength of European militaries, and to enjoy his time on the continent. Additionally, he wanted to reach out to other Europeans nations - particularly Russia and Germany - who he believed could shift the dominance of Britain and France in the region. Chulalongkorn, in summary, then described his tour as "a chance for our country’s [Siam's] survival."

== The Grand Tour ==
Prior to his first grand tour, Chulalongkorn had travelled outside of Siam three times before the tour: in 1871 to Singapore and Java; to British India in 1872; and again to Singapore in 1896. As it was not normal for the King of Siam to travel abroad, palace officials told the Siamese public that Chulalongkorn was travelling to strengthen diplomatic ties and learn from Western cultures. Chulalongkorn's trip to Singapore had been the first trip by a Siamese king abroad during peacetime.

His entourage included the princes Chirapravati Voradej, Jayanta Mongkol, Paribatra Sukhumbandhu, and Svasti Sobhana. For the trip, Chulalongkorn had decided that they should all wear Western clothing and respect European customs in order to present themselves as equals. The main ship used on the trip was the royal yacht Maha Chakri. Throughout the tour, it was sailed by members of the British Royal Navy and had a crew of around 200 Siamese. She had been built in 1892 with defensive capabilities such as small guns and a ram.

=== Arrival in Europe ===
Chulalongkorn and his entourage departed Bangkok on April 7 on board the Maha Chakri. From Bangkok, they sailed to Europe via the Suez Canal with stops at Singapore, Colombo and the Port of Aden. On 14 May, the group arrived first at Venice in Italy, from which they then travelled onwards to Milan and Switzerland. Arriving in Bern on May 17, the group remained in Switzerland up to May 31. Mainly staying at the Hotel Bernerhof, Chulalongkorn ventured also to Interlaken and Geneva. After Switzerland, they travelled back into Italy to visit Rome where Chulalongkorn met with both King Umberto I and Pope Leo XIII in Vatican City. The visit to Vatican City on June 4 was the first by a non-Christian head of state. The group arrived in Hungary on June 22 where they were greeted by Franz Joseph I of Austria. Whilst travelling over land, the Maha Chakri travelled to Britain to take part in Queen Victoria's Diamond Jubilee in June.

=== Russian Empire ===
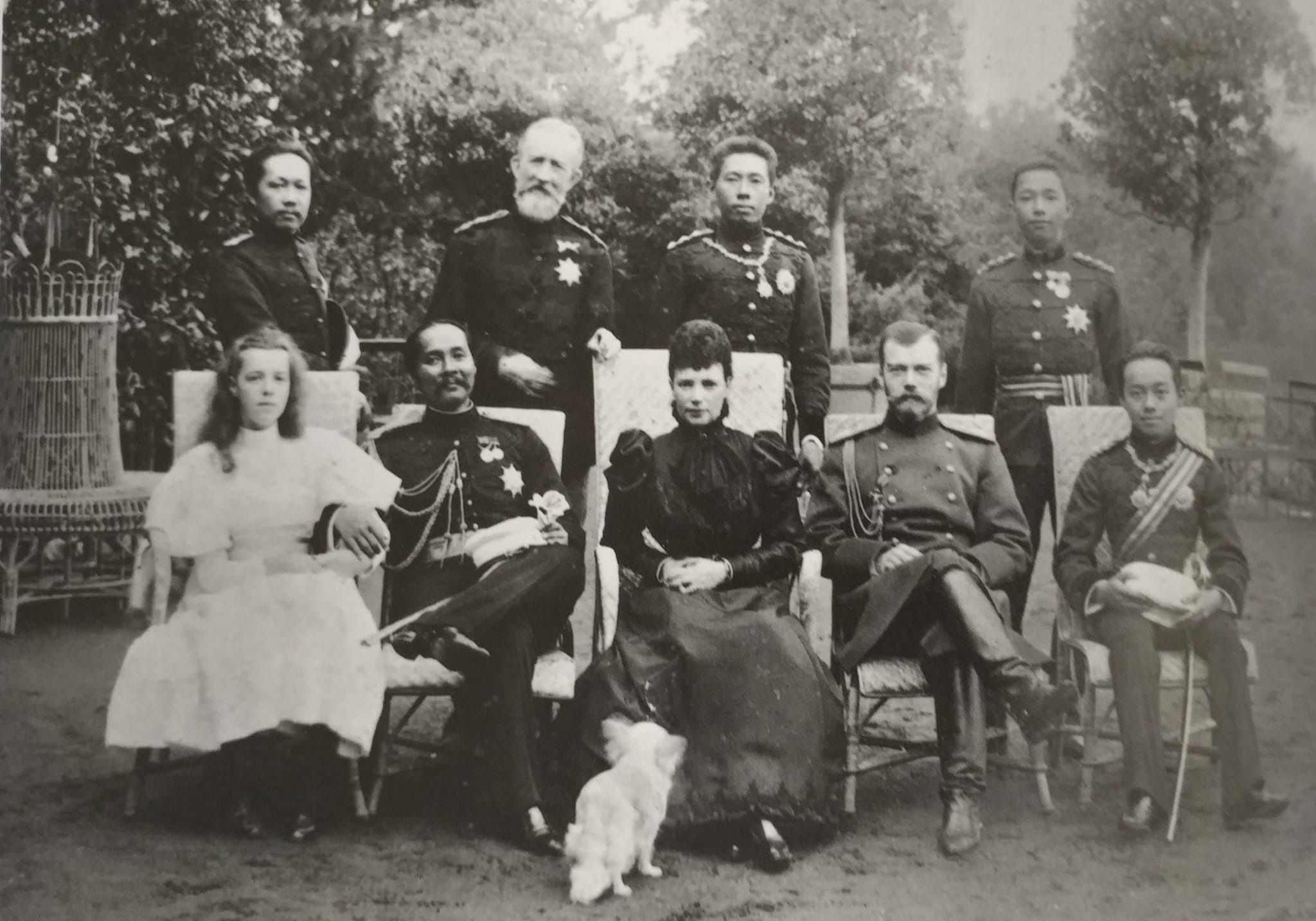
Chulalongkorn with Nicholas II and others at Alexander Palace. Chulalongkorn is shown linking arms with the Tsar's sister, Olga Alexandrovna.

From Austria-Hungary, they travelled by train to Saint Petersburg via Warsaw. They ended up staying in Poland at the Palace on the Isle for a few days before arriving in Saint Petersburg on July 3, residing then at the Peterhof Palace. At private galas, Chulalongkorn was introduced to several of Russia's ministers, commanders and officials. He was also able to sign a Treaty of Friendship and Maritime Navigation with Russia, officially establishing relations between the two countries. On a personal level, Chulalongkorn had befriended Tsar Nicholas II when he arrived in Siam in 1891 on his eastern journey as the Tsesarevich. Chulalongkorn also noted the warm nature of the court towards him, writing that the Tsar's mother, Maria Feodorovna, treated him as a son. They departed Saint Petersburg on July 11 for Scandinavia. Upon his return to Siam, he sent his son Prince Chakrabongse Bhuvanath to study in Russia.

=== Scandinavia and Britain ===
Chulalongkorn arriving at Logårdstrappan in Stockholm.

On July 13, Chulalongkorn arrived in Stockholm, Sweden, where he was received by King Oscar II of Sweden and Norway. In Sweden, Chulalongkorn toured several sites in Stockholm with Oscar II, including the General Art and Industrial Exposition. He also met Leopold II of Belgium who was on a private trip. During a banquet held on the Maha Chakri, Oscar II said that the visit had brought Siam and Sweden closer together. With a particular interest in Sweden's sawmill and transportation industries, Chulalongkorn travelled to northern Sweden between July 17 and 20. In honour of his visit, a road used by Chulalongkorn was named in his honour and a centenary monument (the King Chulalongkorn's Memorial Building) was erected, both in Ragunda.

The Maha Chakri arrived in Copenhagen, Denmark, on July 23, whereupon Chulalongkorn was greeted by King Christian IX. Like in Stockholm, Chulalongkorn mainly toured several sites around Copenhagen and joined the Danish royal family on a visit to Helsingør on their yacht Dannebrog.

From Denmark, Chulalongkorn arrived at Portsmouth on his first visit to Britain. He and his entourage were greeted first by Prince George, Duke of York (the future George V). After residing in London, Chulalongkorn travelled to Osborne House on the Isle of Wight to visit Queen Victoria. On August 21, Chulalongkorn left from Charing Cross to Dover where he caught a ship to Germany. The Maha Chakri had been in Northam for repairs during his visit to Britain.

=== Germany, the Netherlands, and Belgium ===
Chulalongkorn viewed his visit to Germany with great importance, viewing it on a similar level to his visit to Russia. Arriving in Potsdam on August 26, he met with Kaiser Wilhelm II, and together attended several military parades and manoeuvres. He was also presented with early wireless telegraphs. On his part, Chulalongkorn gave an incense burner from Siam as a present to Wilhelm II - it is currently located in Potsdam's Sanssouci Park. Despite the public show of warmth to the Siamese delegation, the depth to which the visit influenced Germany is disputed with alleged German plans to annex Langkawi from the Sultanate of Kedah - a vassal of Siam. However, Germany, like Russia, was keen on Siam remaining independent. Besides Wilhelm II, Chulalongkorn met with Grand Duke Michael Alexandrovich of Russia in Baden, and Otto von Bismarck.

On 6 September, Chulalongkorn arrived in the Netherlands for a small visit where he resided at Het Loo Palace in Apeldoorn as a guest of Queen Wilhelmina and Queen Regent Emma of Waldeck and Pyrmont. Belgium was briefly visited when travelling to France.

=== France ===
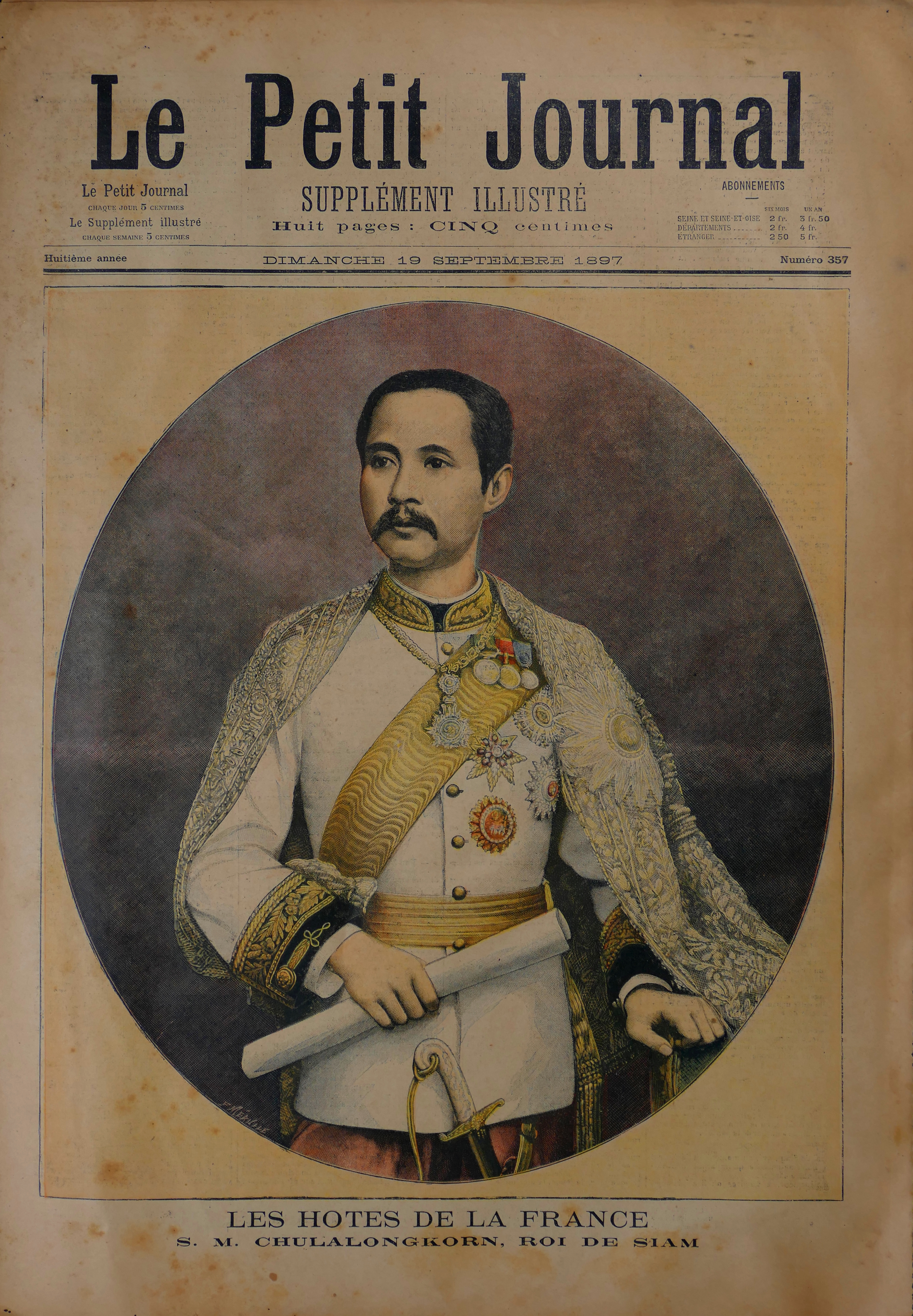
Chulalongkorn on the cover of Le Petit Journal on 19 September 1897.

In the aftermath of the 1893 crisis, there were still some tensions between Siam and France. Among members of the Parti colonial, there were still some pushing for further colonial expansion into Siam. As outlined in his motives for the tour, Chulalongkorn hoped his visit would repair Siam's relations with France. However, there were some moments of hostility between the two. While at the Louvre, Chulalongkorn was rumoured to have refused to shake the hand of a French vice admiral who had fired on Siamese forts in 1893. Additionally, France, unlike the majority of nations Chulalongkorn visited, did not have a monarch he could easily connect with.

From Belgium, Chulalongkorn arrived in Paris on September 11, where he was greeted by French President Félix Faure. Whilst in Paris, he was accommodated along the Avenue Hoche. The next days were spent touring Paris and Versailles, and also meeting different ministers. On September 14, he observed a military parade of 60,000 soldiers at Saint-Quentin with Faure. On September 18, they departed for Le Havre to board the SS Stella for his second visit to Britain.

The visit was extensively covered by the French press, especially the illustrated periodicals. The French was, however, the most critical of Chulalongkorn's tour. La Revue de Paris wrote that the entire tour was out of sheer desperation to resist French expansion. The conservative Le Petit Journal accused Chulalongkorn of being an ardent Anglophile who could not understand France's republican institutions, and that Paris had showcased incomparable grandiose to the potentate that left him "enchanted". Another conservative newspaper, Le Figaro, described Chulalongkorn as a "king of dignity like that of the Europeans", but who lived in wealth whilst the ordinary Siamese lived in poverty. The L'Illustration was less critical, simply commenting that Chulalongkorn had some affection for French culture and that is visit attracted crowds due to Paris' obsession with orientalism. In contrast, several papers were much more hostile than the before mentioned. In L'Intransigeant, Henri Rochefort described Chulalongkorn as one of France's "most openly declared of our enemies" who Britain supports "with all its strength to make demands", while the Le Correspondant described him as France's "most cruel enemy in the Far East". This anti-Siamese sentiment was also shared not only in right-wing papers, but also the socialist La Petite République who said Chulalongkorn had "no other care except to create embarrassment for us [the French]". After the Franco-Thai War in the 1940s, these sentiments were quoted in Le Martin.

During his visit to France, Chulalongkorn managed to discuss French colonial expansion with Faure. While in Europe, Siamese authorities had taken custody of several Cambodians to the anger of the French consul in Bangkok, Raphaël Réau, who demanded the return of French subjects. On his arrival in Paris, Chulalongkorn ordered their release to smooth out relations.

=== Britain, Spain and Italy ===
From France, Chulalongkorn arrived again in Britain at Southampton. They were greeted by a large crowd and Mayor Edward Gayton. He then departed for London, while the Maha Chakri underwent repairs and maintenance in Southampton and Northam. There were a few minor incidents involving the Siamese crew in Southampton. From Britain, he arrived in Portugal where he condemned and ordered a servant to be executed for a breach of etiquette in Lisbon. After Portugal, Chulalongkorn arrived in Spain at Irun on October 16 for a four days tour. In Madrid, he received a warm welcome from Queen Regent María Cristina. Aside from Madrid, Chulalongkorn also visited Seville before departing on 19 October for Italy - his last nation. His second visit to Italy was concise and limited to Naples and Pompeii. On November 2, Chulalongkorn and his entourage boarded the Maha Chakri for the return voyage, arriving back to Bangkok on December 17, 254 days or 9 months after departing for Europe.

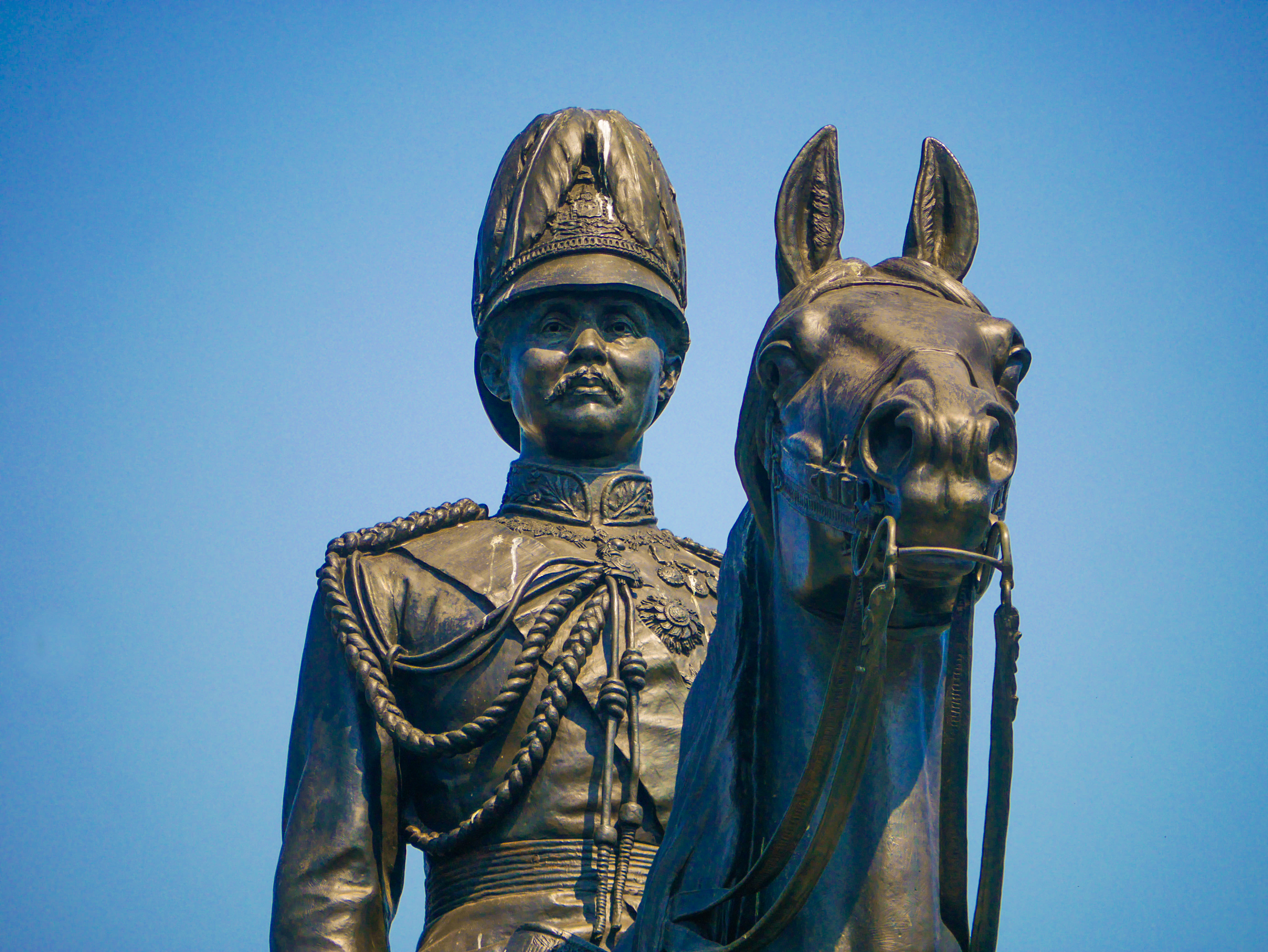
The equestrian statue of Chulalongkorn.

== Results and legacy ==
The tour did not prevent further territorial loss for Siam: the right bank of the Mekong was ceded to France in 1904, Inner Cambodia to France in 1907, and four Malay sultanates to the British in 1909. However, his tour proved to be successful in securing Siam's place in the international community. Diplomatically, his visit preceded a rapprochement with France, although relations were always stronger with Britain. Siam also managed to strengthen its relation with Germany, lasting up to its declaration of war against Germany in World War I. For the monarchies visited by Chulalongkorn, many positively viewed Siam as civilised and Chulalongkorn an "honorary European."

On his visit to France, Chulalongkorn became inspired to commission an equestrian statue erected in 1908 modelled off the equestrian statue of Louis XIV at Versailles. The statue was placed along Ratchadamnoen Avenue, which itself was modelled off Paris' Champs-Élysées.

== More ==
- Chulalongkorn European visits
