= Cholchineepan Chiranond =

Thai diplomat

- ชลชินีพันธุ์ ชีรานนท์

Ambassador of Thailand to Denmark, Lithuania, and Iceland
- In office January 2008 – 2010
- Preceded by: Chaisiri Anamarn
- Succeeded by: Piyawat Niyomrerks

Ambassador of Thailand to Germany
- In office 2003–2007
- Preceded by: Surapong Jayanama
- Succeeded by: Sorayouth Prompoj

Personal details
- Education: Cornell University; Fletcher School of Law and Diplomacy

Cholchineepan Chiranond (Thai: ชลชินีพันธุ์ ชีรานนท์) is a retired Thai diplomat. She served in various diplomatic roles from 1975 onwards, and was Ambassador of Thailand to Germany between 2003 and 2007, and to Denmark, Lithuania and Iceland between 2008, and her retirement in 2010.

== Career ==
=== Early life and postings ===
Cholchineepan attended the Sathit Chulalongkorn School, winning an AFS scholarship to the United States, where she learnt English, and completed her final high school year. She received further scholarships from the Thai Ministry of Foreign Affairs to take her bachelor's degree at Cornell University, and a master's degree at Fletcher School of Law and Diplomacy. The terms of her scholarship required her to work in the ministry for at least twice the period of her study, and she joined the ministry in 1975. She spent the next thirty years working in diplomacy.

Cholchineepan's first job at the ministry was a four-year period working to handle the large influx of Cambodian and Burmese refugees, followed by her first international posting to Kuala Lumpur, Malaysia. After four years in this post she returned to Bangkok and was assigned to work with the United Nations Economic and Social Commission for Asia and the Pacific, headquartered in the city. She was married, with a daughter, at the time of her posting to Malaysia, and requested an international posting close to her husband, also a Thai diplomat. The request was granted and both were posted together to Italy for three years. On the completion of posting, she returned to Bangkok to administer ASEAN management and policies.

=== Ambassadorships ===
Cholchineepan's third overseas posting was as minister to the Thai embassy in Ottawa, Canada. She was accompanied by her daughter, who began studies in Canada, while her husband was posted to New York. On completion of her time in Canada, Cholchineepan returned to Bangkok and was promoted to ambassador, with responsibility for East and Southeast Asian affairs. This was followed by an appointment as director of the Ministry's European Affairs Department, and then six years as director general of the Department of International Organizations. In 2003 she received her first posting as ambassador to a foreign country, becoming ambassador of Thailand to Germany. This gave her responsibility for almost 100,000 Thai nationals living in Germany, overseen by the embassy and assisted by a consulate general in Frankfurt. This required further separation from her family, her daughter having stayed in Canada for her education, while her husband had been appointed ambassador to Sri Lanka. This was the first time in Thai history that a couple had both held ambassadorships, and as of 2021 the only time this has happened.

On the completion of this posting, Cholchineepan was once more based in Bangkok as Deputy Permanent Secretary at the Ministry of Foreign Affairs. At her request, she was offered one last European posting before her retirement, and in January 2008 she was appointed ambassador to Denmark, becoming the first female ambassador Thailand has appointed to the country. She arrived in Copenhagen on 24 January to take over from her predecessor, Chaisiri Anamarn, who had completed a three-year posting. She presented her letter of credence on 28 March 2008. Her posting coincided with the 150th anniversary of the establishment of diplomatic relations between Thailand and Denmark, and was marked with numerous cultural and diplomatic events. She was also the incumbent ambassador during the opening of a special elephant house at Copenhagen Zoo, built to house four Thai elephants which had been gifted to the Danish royal family by King Bhumibol Adulyadej. In addition to her role as ambassador to Denmark, Cholchineepan was concurrently accredited as ambassador to Lithuania and to Iceland. She presented her letter of credence to President of Lithuania Valdas Adamkus on 1 July 2008.

Cholchineepan's European ambassadorships were the culmination of her diplomatic career, and she retired after the completion of her posting in 2010.
