= Prisdang =

Prince of Siam and diplomat (1851–1935)

- Prince of Siam
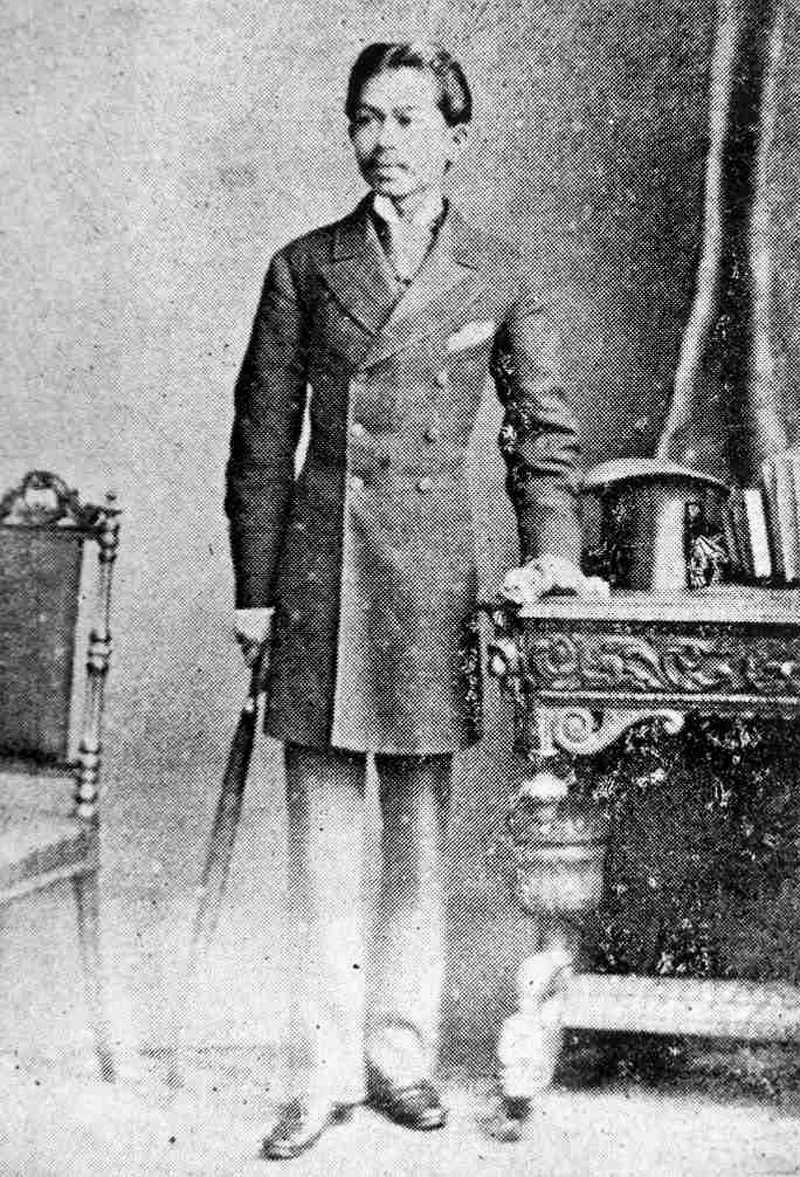
- Born: February 23, 1851; Bangkok, Siam
- Died: March 16, 1935 (aged 84); Bangkok, Siam
- Spouse: Mom Talab Chumsai na Ayudhya
- House: Chakri dynasty
- Father: Prince Chumsai, the Prince Rajchasihavikrom
- Mother: Mom Noi Chumsai na Ayudhya

Prince Prisdang (Thai: พระวรวงศ์เธอ พระองค์เจ้าปฤษฎางค์; RTGS: Pritsadang; 23 February 1851 – 16 March 1935), was a member of the family of the Chakri dynasty of Siam and a Thai diplomat.

== Early life and family ==
Prince Prisdang was born in Bangkok, as Prince Prisdang Chumsai, a grandson of Rama III. He was educated in Singapore and in England, subsequently graduated with all the top awards from King's College London in 1876. The event was reported in The Times of London on 7 July that year.

== Career in diplomacy ==
In 1881 he established the first permanent Siamese Embassy in England presenting his credentials to Queen Victoria in 1882. Over the next five years he became ambassador to eleven European countries and the United States.

King Rama V asked Prince Prisdang his opinion on how to deal with European countries hunting for new colonies. In response Prince Prisdang and his associates—Prince Naresr, Prince Svasti and Prince Sonabundhit and officials at the Thai embassy—penned a draft democratic constitution which stipulated that the monarchy be subject to constitutional law and that there be a cabinet. The proposal is known as the Ror Sor 103 proposal. ("Ror Sor 103" refers to the Rattanakosin calendar that began in 1782, the year King Rama I established Bangkok as the capital of Siam.) The petition's points, in short, are: No means diplomatic, militaristic, buffer-state dependent, or treaties reliant, would suffice to save the country from being colonized. And so it was "mandatory" for the country to reform itself internally, in addition to reforms that had already been instituted but so far not adequate. These additional reforms included: "the change from absolute to constitutional monarchy", the more "clearly defined" Law of succession of the reign, the "eradication of corruption in official circles", "freedom of the press", the establishment of "the law of equality" that would "guarantee equal justice for all", the institution of a "fair system of taxation", a "gradual phasing-in of universal suffrage", the administrative system based on merit and not birth-right.

The aim of the proposal was to make Siam a modern civilized country so that the Western colonial powers would have no excuse to take control of the Kingdom. The petition stated “Under its present form of government the country faces danger from without. A change towards a ‘civilized’ form of government is necessary, viz., the adoption of the European system, such as is being undertaken by Japan. This change can be brought about only with the king's concurrence. The danger is colonization by the European powers, who claim the right to bring civilization, justice, law and order to the oppressed, to open up trade and develop resources."

King Chulalonkorn disapproved of the proposal, replying that Siam was not yet ready for such a radical change. He was mainly displeased because Prisdang involved others. Since the proposal was signed by almost the whole staff of the two legations in London and Paris, it was regarded as holding the king to ransom. Prisdang's suggestion for the abolishment of polygamy in another correspondence also displeased the King. The four princes were recalled to Bangkok, but Prisdang stayed on since he attended the Universal Postal Union meeting in Lisbon in 1884 and in Berlin in 1885, successfully obtaining UPU membership for Siam.

The prince returned to Siam in 1886 and was appointed director-general of the Post and Telegraph Department in which post he remained until 1890. He also helped to set up Siriraj Hospital, organized the Siamese section for the Paris Exhibition of 1889, made a survey map of the coasts and rivers of Siam, and drew up the charter for the establishment of the Ministry of Public Works. Due to disappointment and accusations, he resigned from his post without permission from the King. While on a trip to Japan to establish diplomatic relations, he did not return to Thailand but instead went Malaysia where he worked under the British as a road engineer.

In 1897 he went to Sri Lanka where he became a Buddhist monk with name of Jinavaravaṃsa. His preceptor was the well known scholar monk Waskaḍuwe Śrī Subhūti, whom Prisdang had already met in 1881 while on a visit to Dipaduttamārāma Temple in a suburb of Colombo, and with whom he had since then kept up a correspondence.

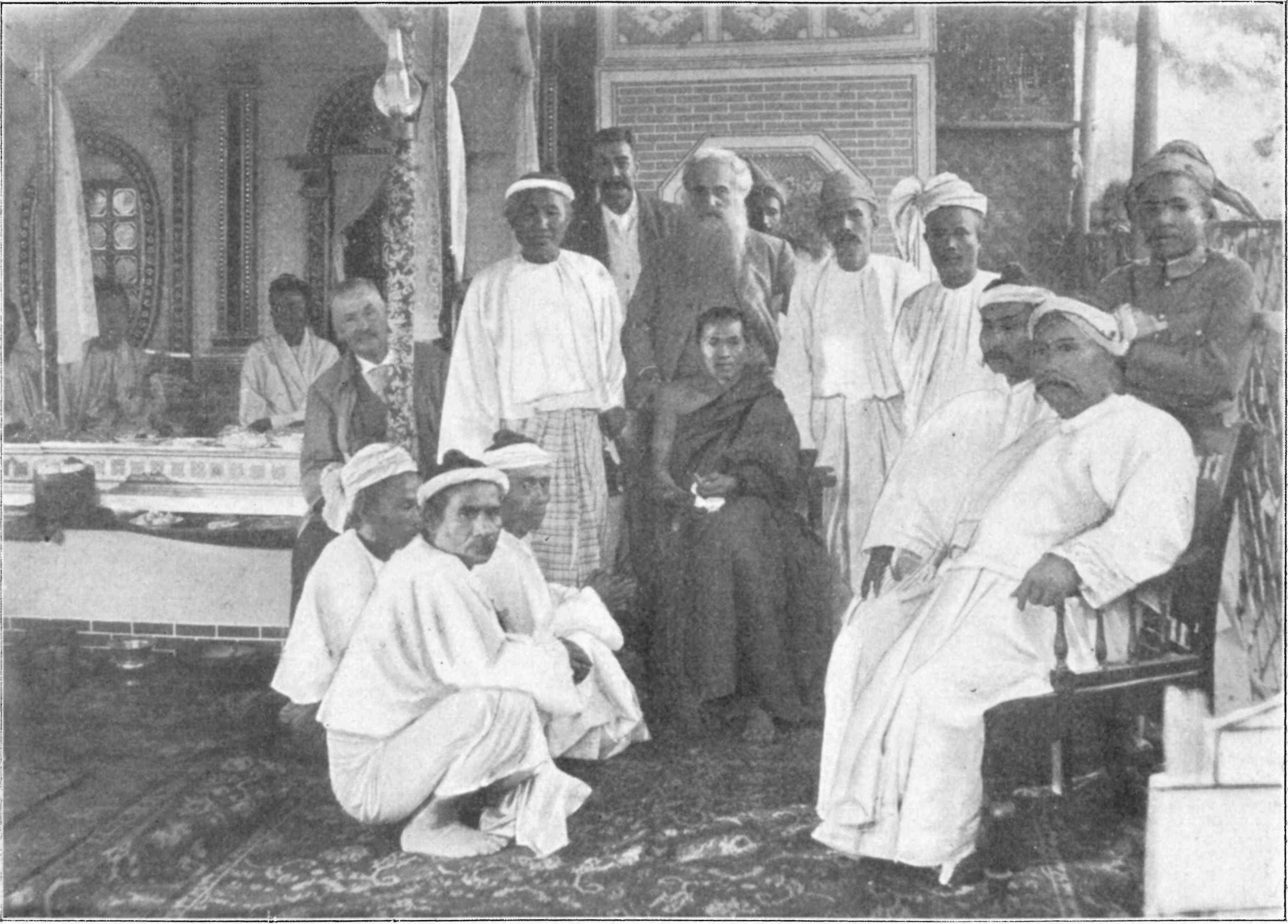
Phra Jinavaravaṃsa or Phra Chao Pridsadang (seated in the middle) while on a pilgrimage to Burma in 1899. In this photo, he is pictured with Colonel Henry Steele Olcott, an American Buddhist. (standing behind Jinavaravaṃsa)

While Jinavaravaṃsa went on a pilgrimage to the sacred Buddhist places in India he went to Lumbini on the border with Nepal, where William Claxton Peppé showed him the relic casket with bone relics of the Buddha that he had recently dug up from the remains of stupa on his estate at Piprahwa, now identified with Kapilavatthu. Through Jinavaravaṃsa's intercession, the Viceroy of India agreed to give the relics to King Chulalongkorn of Siam, who had them placed in Wat Saket in Bangkok. After Jinavaravaṃsa returned to Sri Lanka from India, he accepted the invitation to become the abbot of Dipaduttamārāma Temple. Here he made a stupa resembling the Mahabodhi Temple at Bodhgaya wherein he enshrined the small jewels from the Piprahwa relic casket that he had been given by Mr. Peppé. He also lived for some time with the German Buddhist monk Nyanatiloka on a tiny island in a bay near Matara, which he called “Culla Lanka” (“Small Lanka” with a pun on King Chulalonkorn's name).

== Death ==
In 1911 he returned to Bangkok for the cremation of King Chulalongkorn, and was then forced to disrobe by Prince Damrong Rajanubhab due to his violation of the rule against stealing that entailed expulsion from monkhood for life. He was not allowed to leave Thailand or reordain as a Buddhist monk, and lived in poverty until his death in 1935.

== Proposed new constitution ==
Prince Prisdang proposed the proposal for the first Siamese constitution in 1885. These are the seven points for the proposed constitution: “The proposed Constitution does not mean, at this stage, setting up a Parliament. But it will involve the following measures:

- 1. Change must be made from an absolute to a constitutional monarchy.
- 2. Defence and administration of the country should be in the hands of ministers who will together form a Cabinet, and a clearly formulated Law of Succession should be promulgated.
- 3. All corruption is to be stamped out, and to ensure this, the salaries of government officials are to be made sufficient.
- 4. Universal contentment is to be met by ensuring equality before the law, including the tax system.
- 5. Outdated traditions are to be done away with, however time-honoured they may have become.
- 6. Freedom of thought, freedom of speech and freedom of the press are to be guaranteed.
- 7. Appointments and dismissals in government service are to be determined by clearly defined legislation.
