= Ogden Codman Jr. =

American architect (1863–1951)

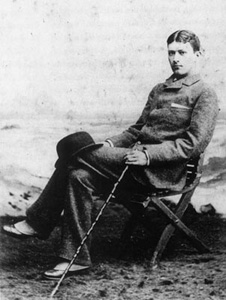
- Born: January 19, 1863; Boston, Massachusetts, U.S.
- Died: January 8, 1951 (aged 87); Évry-Grégy-sur-Yerre, France
- Education: Massachusetts Institute of Technology
- Known for: Co-author of The Decoration of Houses
- Spouse: Leila Griswold Webb (m. 1904; died 1910)
- Children: J. Griswold Webb (stepson)
- Parent(s): Ogden Codman Sr. Sarah Fletcher Bradlee
- Relatives: John Hubbard Sturgis (uncle); Bowdoin Crowninshield (cousin)

Ogden Codman Jr. (January 19, 1863 – January 8, 1951) was an American architect and interior decorator in the Beaux-Arts styles, and co-author with Edith Wharton of The Decoration of Houses (1897), which became a standard in American interior design.

== Early life ==
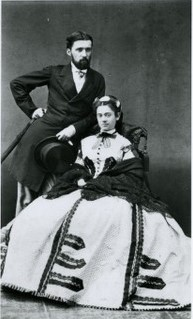
Codman family manuscripts collection. Ogden Codman, Sr. and wife Sarah Bradlee Codman

Codman was born on January 19, 1863, in Boston, Massachusetts, the eldest of six children of Boston native Ogden Codman Sr. (1839–1904) and his wife, the former Sarah Fletcher Bradlee.

His paternal grandparents were Charles Russell Codman and Sarah (née Ogden) Codman. His paternal aunt, Frances Anne Codman, was married to noted architect and builder John Hubbard Sturgis, who designed Codman House, his parents' home in Lincoln, Massachusetts, and the Boston Museum of Fine Arts, along with Charles Brigham. His maternal grandparents were James Bowdoin Bradlee and Mary (née May) Bradlee. His maternal aunt, Katherine May Bradlee, was married to Benjamin W. Crowninshield and was the mother of Bowdoin Bradlee Crowninshield, Codman's first cousin.

Codman spent much of his youth from 1875 to 1884 at Dinard, an American resort colony in France, and on returning to America in 1884, studied at the Massachusetts Institute of Technology.

== Career ==
He was influenced in his career by two uncles, John Hubbard Sturgis, an architect, and Richard Ogden, a decorator. He greatly admired Italian and French architecture of the sixteenth, seventeenth, and eighteenth centuries, as well as English Georgian architecture and the colonial architecture of Boston.

After brief apprenticeships with Boston architectural firms, Codman started his own practice in Boston, where he kept offices from 1891 to 1893, after which time he relocated his main practice from Boston to New York City. Codman also opened offices in Newport, Rhode Island as early as 1891, and it was in Newport that he first met novelist Edith Wharton. She became one of his first Newport clients for her home there, Land's End. In her autobiography, A Backward Glance, Wharton wrote:

We asked him to alter and decorate the house—a somewhat new departure, since the architects of that day looked down on house-decoration as a branch of dress-making, and left the field up to the upholsterers, who crammed every room with curtains, lambrequins, jardinières of artificial plants, wobbly velvet-covered tables littered with silver gew-gaws, and festoons of lace on mantelpieces and dressing tables.

Codman viewed interior design as "a branch of architecture".

=== Architectural works ===
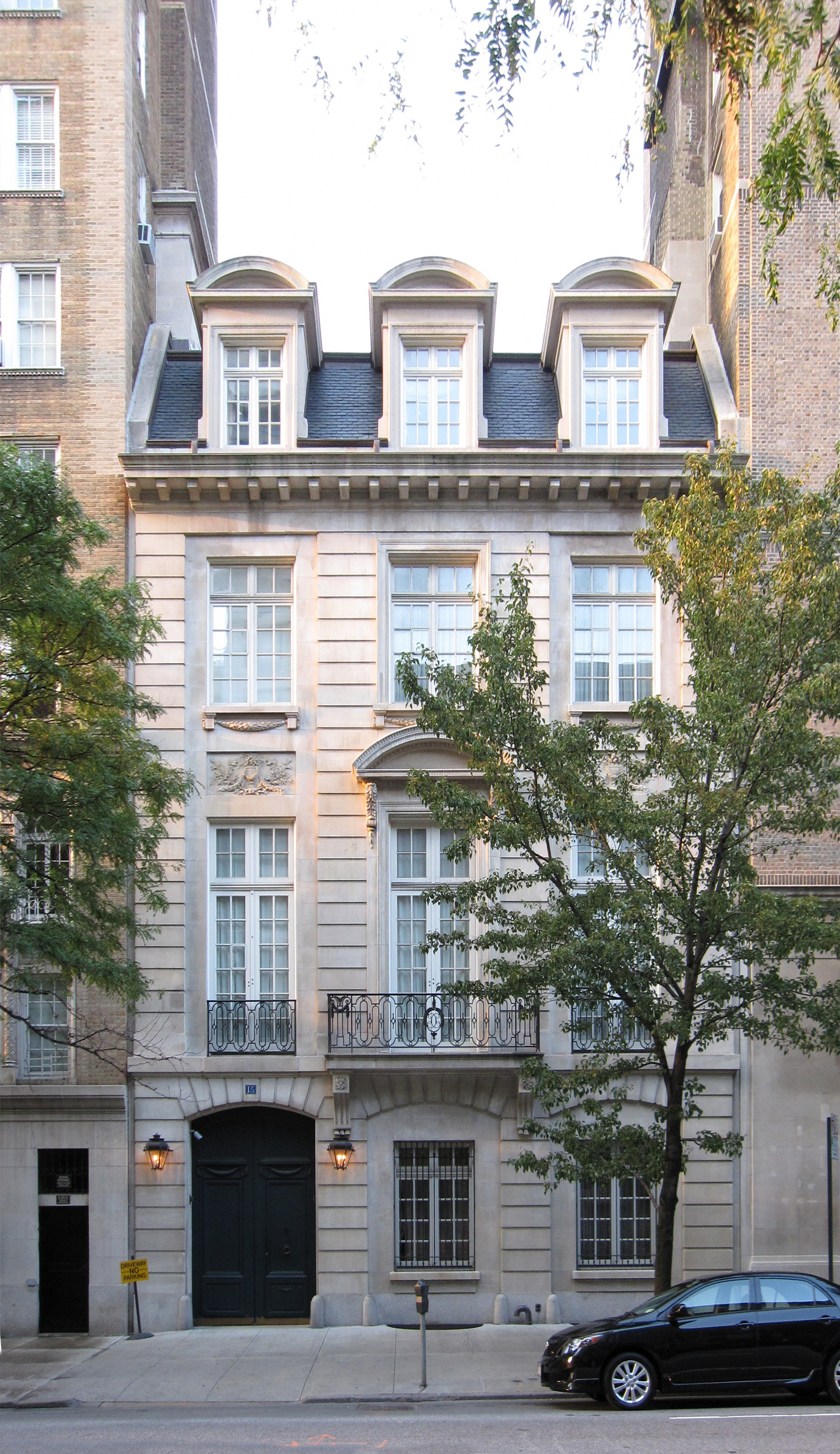
The Lucy Drexel Dahlgren House at 15 East 96th Street, New York

Wharton subsequently introduced Codman to Cornelius Vanderbilt II, who hired Codman in 1894 to design the second and third floor rooms of his Newport summer home, The Breakers, which he did in a clean eighteenth-century French and Italian classical style. Codman was not a draftsman, and it is said that in Paris he hired a talented group of students from the École des Beaux-Arts to draw up the sketches for Vanderbilt.

In 1907, Codman built what was later to be known as the Codman–Davis House in Washington, D.C. for his cousin Martha Codman Karolik. It is currently the official residence of the Ambassador of Thailand, and one of the few intact homes that he designed. He also designed the Codman Carriage House and Stable, located a few blocks south.

Codman's New York clients included John D. Rockefeller Jr., for whom he designed the interiors of the Rockefeller family mansion of Kykuit in 1913, and Frederick William Vanderbilt, for whom he designed the interiors for his mansion in Hyde Park, New York, and his house on Fifth Avenue. He also collaborated with Wharton on the redesign of her townhouse at 882–884 Park Avenue as well as on the design of The Mount, her house in Lenox, Massachusetts. His suave and idiomatic suite of Régence and Georgian parade rooms for entertaining are preserved in the townhouse at 991 Fifth Avenue, now occupied by the American Irish Historical Society. His French townhouse in the manner of Gabriel at 18 East 79th Street, for J. Woodward Haven (1908–09) is now occupied by Acquavella Galleries.

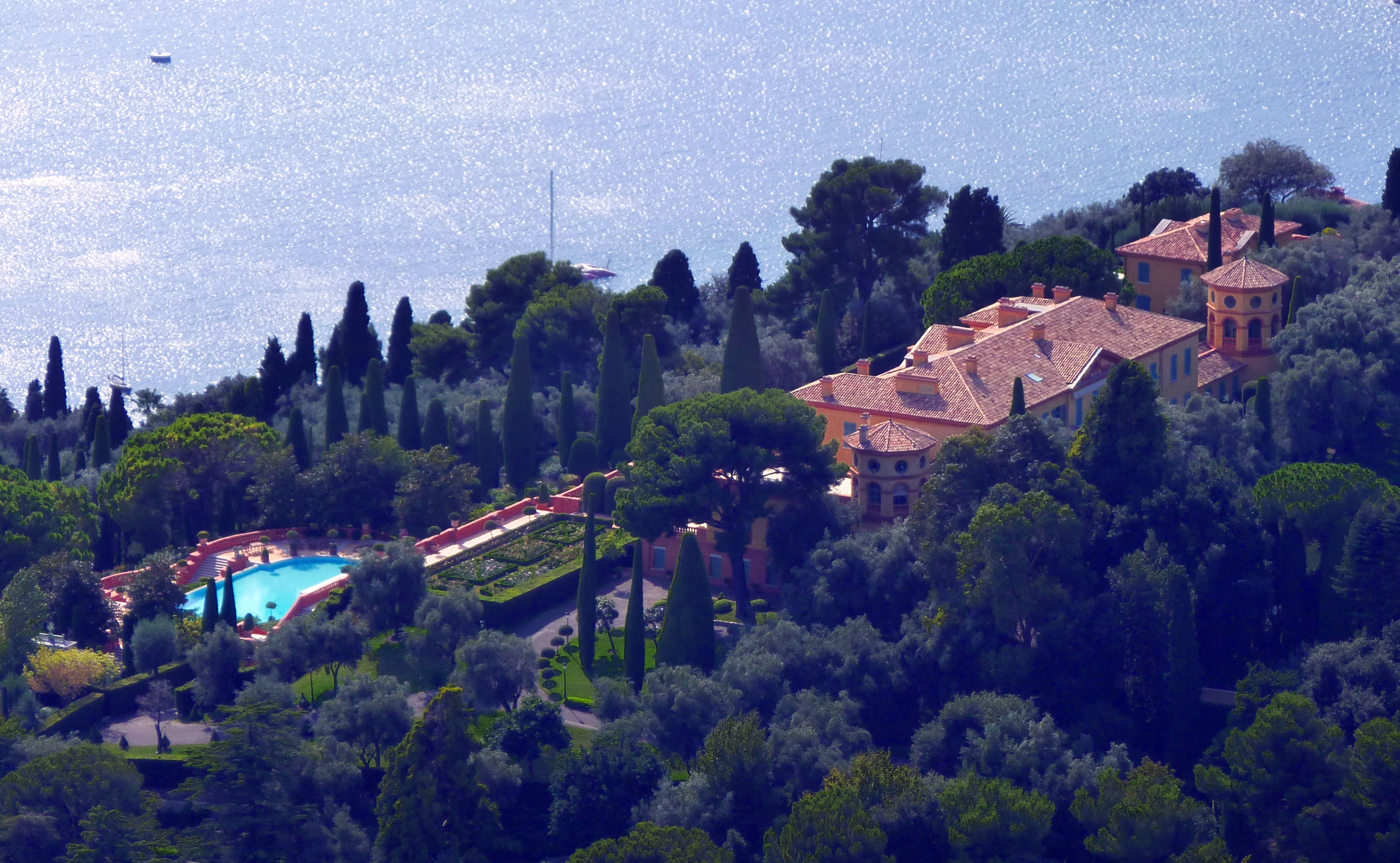
Villa Leopolda

All told, Codman designed 22 houses to completion, as well as the East Wing of the Metropolitan Club in New York. He also began the trend of lowering the townhouse entrance door from elevated stairways to the basement level. He designed a series of three houses in Louis XIV style at 7 (his own residence), 12, and 15 East 96th Street from 1912 to 1916. The New York City Landmarks Preservation Commission later described the facade of number 7 as being "full of gaiety and frivolous vitality" and further, "on approaching the house, Paris and the Champs-Élysées immediately come to mind." ......

In 1920, Codman left New York to return to France, where he spent the last thirty-one years of his life at the Château de Grégy, wintering at Villa Leopolda in Villefranche-sur-Mer, which he created by assembling a number of vernacular structures and their sites: it is his masterpiece, the fullest surviving expression of his esthetic.

== Personal life ==
Codman was homosexual and pursued attractive young men throughout his life, but on October 8, 1904, he married Leila Griswold Webb (1856-1910), who was six years older and was the widow of railroad magnate H. Walter Webb and the mother of New York State Senator J. Griswold Webb. Leila was the sister-in-law of Dr. William Seward Webb, who was married to the former Eliza Vanderbilt, and Alexander S. Webb, the longstanding President of City College of New York. His wife died in 1910, leaving him a fortune. After her death, he sold their house on 15 East 51st Street (which he had designed for Leila while she was still married to her first husband) and built himself another home at 7 East 96th Street in 1912.

In 1918, Codman leased the former Newport cottage of society leader James Vanderburgh Parker, known as "Sans Souci" and located on Merton Road, for the summer.

Codman died at age 87 in 1951 at the Château de Grégy in Évry-Grégy-sur-Yerre, France. His architectural drawings and papers are collected at the Avery Architectural and Fine Arts Library at Columbia University; the Codman Family papers are also held by Historic New England and the Boston Athenaeum.

== See also ==
- Andrews House, built 1900–1901 as the winter home of textile magnate Alfred M. Coats.
- Ogden Codman House, built 1912–1913.
