= Lucy Drexel Dahlgren House =

Historic house in Manhattan, New York

- U.S. National Register of Historic Places
- New York City Landmark
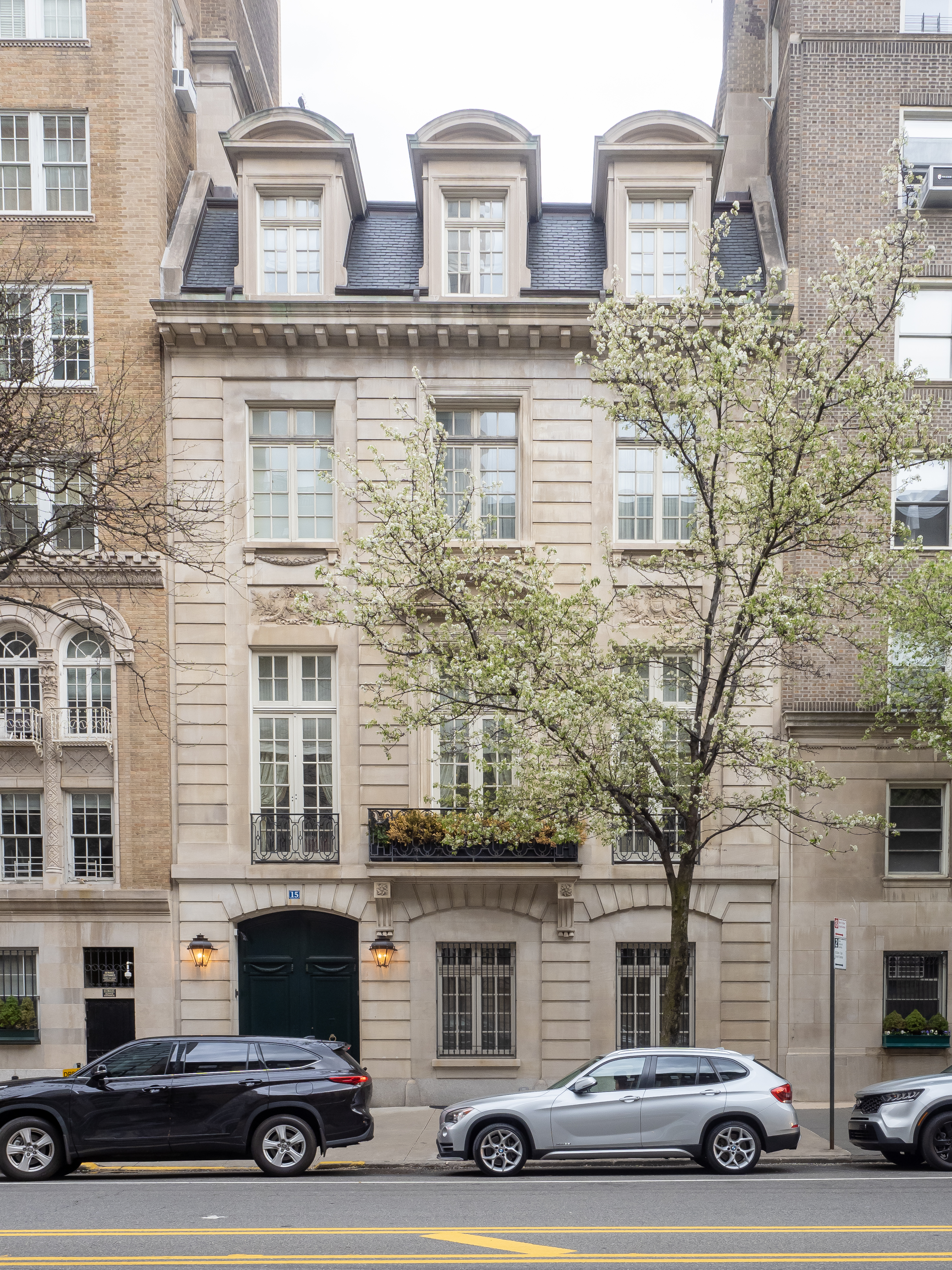

- Location within New York City Location within New York Location within the United States
- Location: 15 East 96th Street; Manhattan, New York City
- Coordinates: 40°47′16″N 73°57′16″W
- Built: 1915–1916; 110 years ago
- Architect: Ogden Codman, Jr.
- Architectural style: French Renaissance
- NRHP reference No.: 89000946
- NYCL No.: 1267

Significant dates
- Added to NRHP: July 20, 1989
- Designated NYCL: June 19, 1984

The Lucy Drexel Dahlgren House is a historic home located at 15 East 96th Street between Fifth and Madison Avenues in Manhattan, New York City. It is on the border between the Carnegie Hill, Upper East Side, and East Harlem neighborhoods on the Upper East Side, within the Upper East Side Historic District. A private house used at one time as a convent, it was built in 1915–16 for Lucy Wharton Drexel Dahlgren. It is a New York City Landmark and is on the National Register of Historic Places.

== Site ==
The Lucy Drexel Dahlgren House is at 15 East 96th Street in the Carnegie Hill and Upper East Side neighborhoods of Manhattan in New York City, abutting East Harlem. It is on the northern side of 96th Street between Fifth Avenue and Madison Avenue. The rectangular land lot covers 3,784 ft^{2} (351.5 m^{2}), with a frontage of 37.5 ft (11.4 m) on 96th Street and a depth of 100.92 ft (30.76 m).

The Dahlgren House is one of three structures on the same city block designed by Ogden Codman Jr. The others include Codman's own residence at 7 East 96th Street, which he had built in 1912–13, as well as the Carnegie Hill School building at 12 East 96th Street. Codman also designed plans for houses at 9 and 11 East 96th Street, which were not constructed. The remaining buildings on the adjacent city block of 96th Street are mostly apartment buildings. Other nearby structures include the Mrs. Amory S. Carhart House and Ernesto and Edith Fabbri House to the south, as well as the St. Nicholas Russian Orthodox Cathedral to the north.

== Architecture ==
The house was designed by Ogden Codman Jr. in the French Renaissance Revival or Beaux Arts styles, emulating a 19th-century French townhouse. It has a rectangular massing and is 5 1/2 stories high. The AIA Guide to New York City describes it as "magisterial" and "disciplined", while the author Michael C. Kathrens describes the house as "suave and sophisticated, with details crisply expressed".

=== Facade ===
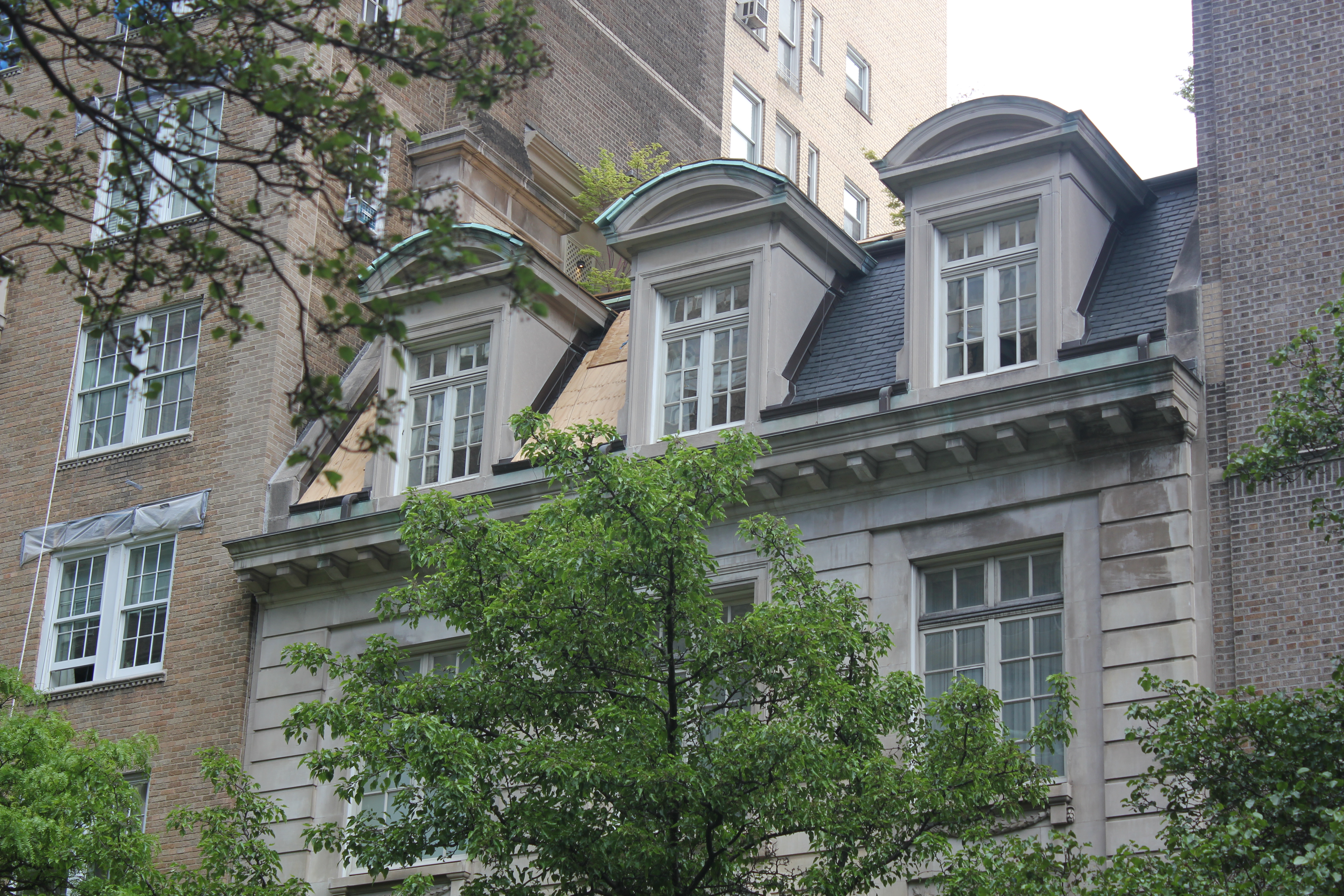
Windows at the top of the house

The facade along 96th Street is 3 1/2 stories tall and is divided vertically into three bays. The facade is largely symmetrical and contains classical ornamentation. It is roughly divided horizontally into three parts: the ground story, the next two stories, and the attic. It is faced with rusticated limestone blocks decorated with bas-relief swags of vegetation. On the second and third stories, the rusticated blocks are interspersed with windows surrounded by recessed limestone panels, which give the appearance of pilasters rising to the attic.

The lowest part of the facade includes a 2-foot-high (0.61 m) smooth-granite water table, with granite posts flanking each bay. At the first floor are three segmental arches; the central and eastern arches contain inset ashlar blocks surrounding a set of casement windows topped by transom panes. Both of these windows have wooden frames and wrought-iron grilles, in addition to protruding window sills made of limestone. The westernmost segmental arch contains a set of double wooden doors with moldings and panels. Among the motifs on the doors are swags and toruses with berries and bay leaves. On the main facade above the first floor is a band course with fascia, which protrudes slightly from the center bay.

The second floor is treated as a piano nobile with tall windows. At the second floor is a central balcony supported by volutes in the Louis XIV style; the balcony is made of limestone and has an elaborate wrought-iron railing. The central second-floor window is a French door. The French door is surrounded by a limestone surround with fascia and is flanked by console brackets, which support a segmentally arched pediment. The outer windows on the second story have wrought-iron railings and recessed limestone panels on each side. All three second-story openings are casement windows with transoms and wrought-iron guards. Above each of these windows is a recessed spandrel panel made of limestone, with bas-reliefs of various motifs.

The windows on the third story are shorter than those on the second story. Each third-story opening is flat and contains a casement window with transoms. The sills beneath each third-story window have "feet" and a carved swag. The attic is set off by protruding limestone cornice and a limestone band course right above it. On the attic are three dormer windows set within a mansard roof made of slate; the dormer windows were intended to mirror the arrangement of the lower stories' bays. Within each dormer window is a casement, a transom window, and a limestone surround. Above the left and right walls of the house are rectangular chimneys that adjoin the apartment buildings on either side of the house.

=== Vehicular entrance ===
Unlike in other American residences (but similarly to some French residences), the house's main entrance did not lead directly into the house. Instead, the western side of the house's ground floor includes a porte-cochère, outdoor courtyard, and garage. The double doors on the main facade connect with the porte-cochère, a long, narrow space that measures 35.08 feet (10.69 m) long. Its pavement is composed of pale orange bricks in a herringbone pattern, flanked by granite steps on both sides. The porte-cochère's walls are composed of a smooth granite base, above which is a limestone surface with alternating recessed panels and rusticated strips; a granite band; and limestone crown moldings. On the right wall is a granite step leading up to the house's main entrance, which is through a set of glass double doors. The porte-cochère has a painted plaster ceiling. At the end of the porte-cochère are two bollards under a segmental arch, which in turn leads to the interior courtyard.

The courtyard measures 45 feet (14 m) long and has a pale-orange brick pavement, similar to the porte-cochère. On the eastern side of the courtyard is a brick facade with limestone trim. Protruding from the courtyard's facade is a pavilion shaped similarly to three of an octagon's sides. This pavilion contains French doors at the first and second stories, while the upper floors have casement with transom windows. In addition, there is a glass and wrought-iron door on the eastern wall to the left of the protruding pavilion, while there is a protruding bay with a French door to the right of that pavilion. A brick wall measuring about 7 feet (2.1 m) tall runs along the west or left side of the courtyard. On the north or rear side are sliding oak doors which measure 7.83 feet (2.39 m) wide and lead to the garage in the rear. The house is one of a relative few in Manhattan with a garage. The garage contains an automobile turntable, which measures about 26 feet (7.9 m) wide and could turn a car 90 degrees onto a car elevator leading to the basement.

=== Interior ===
There are 37 rooms. The interior has eleven bathrooms and seven fireplaces. The upper stories could be reached either by an elevator, a servant's stair at the rear of the house, or the stair at the front of the house.

==== First and second floors ====
The entry from the porte-cochère leads to a rectangular vestibule with floors made of Botticino marble and Belgian black marble; a baseboard and wall shelves made of Botticino marble; and walls and ceiling cornices made of plaster. Steel gates with sidelights and French hardware lead from the vestibule to the main hall. The main hall is oriented from south to north and is made of similar materials as the rectangular vestibule, although the ceiling has an inset panel. On the eastern wall of the main hall is a stairway with Botticino marble steps, which leads up to the second-floor hall and has wrought-iron banisters. A door on the eastern wall of the main hall leads to a restroom under the staircase.

To the south of the first-floor hall are paneled double doors leading to a rectangular reception room, which faces 96th Street. This space has white-oak floors; a paneled dado; three mirrors, multicolored sconces, and bas-reliefs on the walls; a fireplace mantel flanked by built-in closets; windows on the south wall; and a crystal chandelier. The main hall's northern end is an elevator lobby with a window facing west, an elevator door facing east, and a double door leading to an octagonal study with similar decorations to the reception room. The rear of the first floor was devoted to servants; the study was formerly divided into the servants' dining room and the kitchen, and behind it is a vestibule that doubles as a private entrance.

On the second floor, or piano nobile, is a double-height north-south hall that is similar in design to that on the first floor. The hallway's west wall includes a balcony that overlooks the courtyard. At the south end of the hallway is a double-height drawing room/library with English oak floors, a paneled dado, wall panels, and a plaster cornice and coved ceiling. The drawing room has a fireplace, and French doors on the south wall. The console of a player organ manufactured by Estey was originally against the north wall of this room. The organ was installed in 1916 and later expanded to three manuals. It was restored in the late 1990s, when it was believed to be the last player organ in New York City, and placed in storage in the 2000s. The northern end of the hallway includes an elevator vestibule with a barrel vault, which is decorated similarly to the vestibule on the first floor. This vestibule leads to a polygonal dining room with a double-height ceiling and two fountains. The dining room has terrazzo floors with marble borders, in addition to niches with wine coolers. The dining room's east wall contains an English oak buffet, while the north wall has doors leading to a pantry and kitchen. There is a mezzanine above the pantry and kitchen area, which includes three servants' bedrooms, a bathroom, and a closet.

==== Upper stories ====
There are bedrooms on the third and fourth floors, On the third floor, there is an octagonal sitting room in the center; two large master bedrooms at the front; and two smaller bedrooms and a bathroom to the north. The larger of the two master bedrooms (at the southeast corner) has white oak floors, a dado, plaster walls, a cornice, and a painted plaster ceiling. This master bedroom has a bathroom and dressing areas with mirrored walls. The sitting room also has a white oak floor, dado, and plaster walls and ceiling; there is a marble fireplace mantel on the room's north wall.

The fourth floor or attic originally had two master bedrooms at the front, an octagonal bedroom in the middle, and three rear bedrooms. Originally, there were three bedrooms for the Dahlgren family, a trunk room, and three bedrooms for servants. When Pierre Cartier (the founder of the Cartier's jewelry store) lived in the house, he combined the two front bedrooms, added a niche flanked by Corinthian columns, and added closets hidden behind a paneled wall. The master bedroom also has a concrete slab floor; a wall with a dado, fluted pilasters, and panels; concealed lighting; and two chandeliers. On the east wall was a similarly designed sitting room. During Cartier's time at the house, the octagonal bedroom became a library with glazed bookcases, and one of the rear bedrooms became a niche. The octagonal library has concrete floors; bookcases with windows on the west and southwest walls; an entrance with Corinthian columns to the south; a fireplace mantel with sculptured ornament to the north; and a niche to the east. The three rear bedrooms are accessed by a barrel-vaulted door; Cartier modified these rooms with mirrors and Corinthian columns when he lived there, and these rooms have since been further combined.

The fifth floor originally had seven additional servants' bedrooms, in addition to a laundry room and an echo chamber for the second-floor organ. As part of a 1988 renovation, a chapel at the front of the fifth floor became a solarium, the formerly separate rooms were combined into a single exhibition gallery space, and two bathrooms were added. The fifth floor retains some original details, but the original concrete floors have since been clad with oak. The sixth floor was initially a laundry room and has unglazed ceramic tiles.

== History ==
=== 1900s to 1930s ===
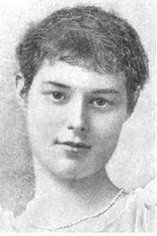
Lucy Drexel Dahlgren, from an 1896 publication

The Dahlgren House was built as part of a development boom in Carnegie Hill at the beginning of the 20th century, spurred by the development of business magnate Andrew Carnegie's mansion at 91st Street and Fifth Avenue. The house's site was part of a larger lot that James C. Parrish had sold to Morris J. Leonhardt in 1901; the sale stipulated that only single-family dwellings of at least three stories were allowed on the site for 25 years. The Dahlgren House's site eventually passed to Edward Shearson in 1913.

Lucy Wharton Drexel Dahlgren, the daughter of financier Joseph William Drexel and his wife Lucy Wharton Drexel, had inherited $22 million from her father after his death in 1888 and another $5 million following her mother's death in 1912. She originally lived ar 812 Madison Avenue in New York City. When Dahlgren filed for divorce from her husband, Eric Bernard Dahlgren Sr., in 1912, she moved to Paris with their eight children. While in Paris, Lucy Dahlgren met the architect Ogden Codman Jr., who persuaded her to buy a site at 15 West 96th Street near to his own house. Dahlgren purchased the site in February 1915 from Edward Shearson. That June, Codman filed plans for "a high-class residence" on the site, which was to cost $75,000 and rise six stories. The structure was constructed between 1915 and 1916, and it was reported as almost finished by July 1916.

Dahlgren spent little time in the house. She split her time between the 96th Street house, Newport in Rhode Island, Florence, and Paris. Dahlgren is last recorded as having lived there in 1922. The house was next occupied by Pierre Cartier. As early as 1921, he is recorded as having leased the house from Dahlgren; Cartier ultimately bought it from Dahlgren in 1927. He mainly lived in a 35-room mansion on 19 acres (7.7 ha) of land that he owned in Roslyn Harbor, New York, and used the 96th Street house as an urban pied-à-terre. Cartier hired Francis Verpillerux c. 1931 to renovate the house's interiors; these renovations included modifications to the fourth-floor bedrooms.

=== 1940s to present ===
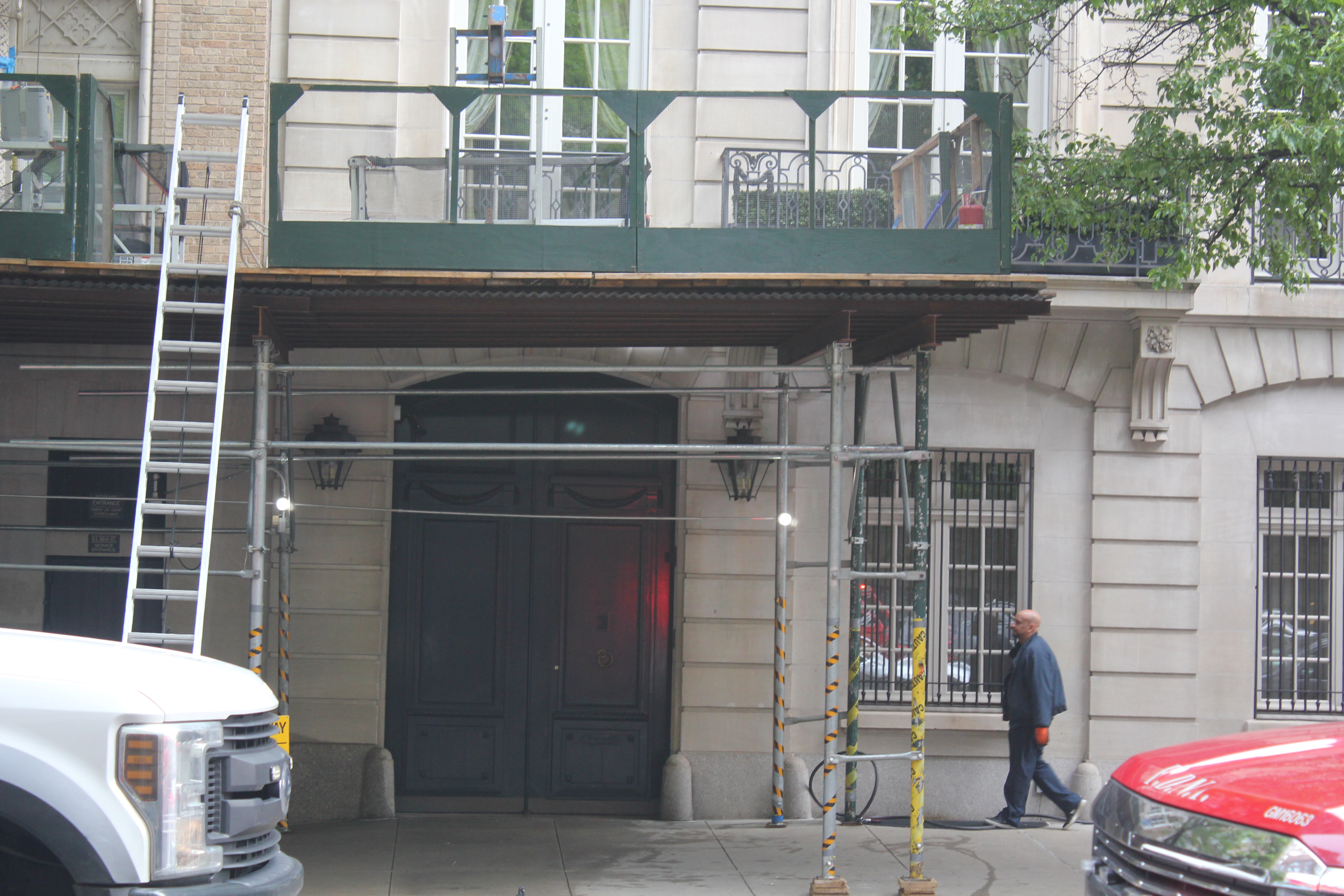
The main entrance

In 1945, on his retirement, Cartier sold the house to the St. Francis de Sales Roman Catholic Church. Cartier, who had sold off his Roslyn Harbor mansion the previous year, relocated to Geneva in upstate New York with his wife. The church used the house as a convent for the nuns who taught at its parochial school.

In 1981, the church sold the house to the businessman Barry Trupin for $3 million. Trupin refurbished its mechanical systems. The businessman Paul Singer bought the house circa 1987 for $5.7 million. Singer began restoring the house with the intention of creating a museum of late 19th- and early 20th-century furniture and objets d'art. Thompson/Robinson/Toraby Architects restored the facade between 1988 and 1989. The three rear bedrooms on the fourth floor were combined as part of this renovation, while the fifth floor was converted into a gallery and offices. After a resale, it was comprehensively restored in 2004. The house remained a private residence in the early 21st century.

The house was designated a New York City Landmark in 1984, and was added to the National Register of Historic Places in 1989. It is located within the Upper East Side Historic District, and has received an award from the Friends of the Upper East Side Historic Districts.

== See also ==
- List of New York City Designated Landmarks in Manhattan from 59th to 110th Streets
- National Register of Historic Places listings in Manhattan from 59th to 110th Streets
