= The Decoration of Houses =

1897 interior design manual by Edith Wharton

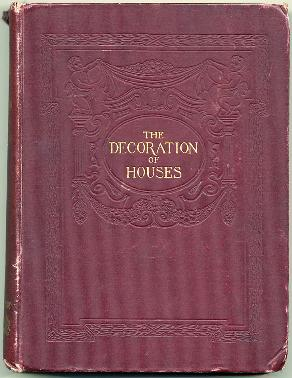
- The Decoration of Houses, 1898 edition
- Author: Edith Wharton
- Language: English
- Genre: Interior design
- Publisher: B. T. Batsford
- Publication date: 1898
- Publication place: United States
- Media type: Print (Hardback)
- Pages: 204
- ISBN: 978-0-8478-2916-3 (2007 Rizzoli reprint)
- OCLC: 86111252
- Dewey Decimal: 747 22
- LC Class: NK2110 .W5 1897a

The Decoration of Houses, a manual of interior design written by Edith Wharton with architect Ogden Codman, was first published in 1897. In the book, the authors denounce Victorian-style interior decoration and interior design, especially rooms decorated with heavy window curtains, Victorian bric-a-brac and overstuffed furniture. They argue that such rooms emphasize upholstery at the expense of proper space planning and architectural design and are, therefore, uncomfortable and rarely used. Wharton and Codman advocated the creation of houses with rooms decorated with strong architectural wall and ceiling treatments, accentuated by well-suited furniture, rooms based on simple, classical design principles such as symmetry and proportion and a sense of architectural balance. The Decoration of Houses is considered a seminal work and its success led to the emergence of professional decorators working in the manner advocated by its authors, most notably Elsie de Wolfe. The book was reprinted by The Mount and Rizzoli and in a hardcover facsimile in 2007.

== Concepts ==
Wharton and Codman wrote 198 pages divided into sixteen chapters. The first few chapters focus on the importance of balance, symmetry and good use of space, while later chapters have to do with the specific use of rooms and how rooms ought to be arranged in order to ensure optimal comfort and usefulness.

Wharton and Codman were very fond of past styles of furniture in comparison with the upstart Victorian furnishings surrounding them. Much preferring simplicity and order in decoration, they warned readers not to mix and match styles of furniture eclectically. They also preferred the use of less detail, looking down on the Victorian love for clutter and busy wallpapers and fabrics.

== See also ==
- The Mount (Lenox, Massachusetts)
- Victorian decorative arts
