= 96th Street station (Second Avenue Subway) =

New York City Subway station in Manhattan

96 Street
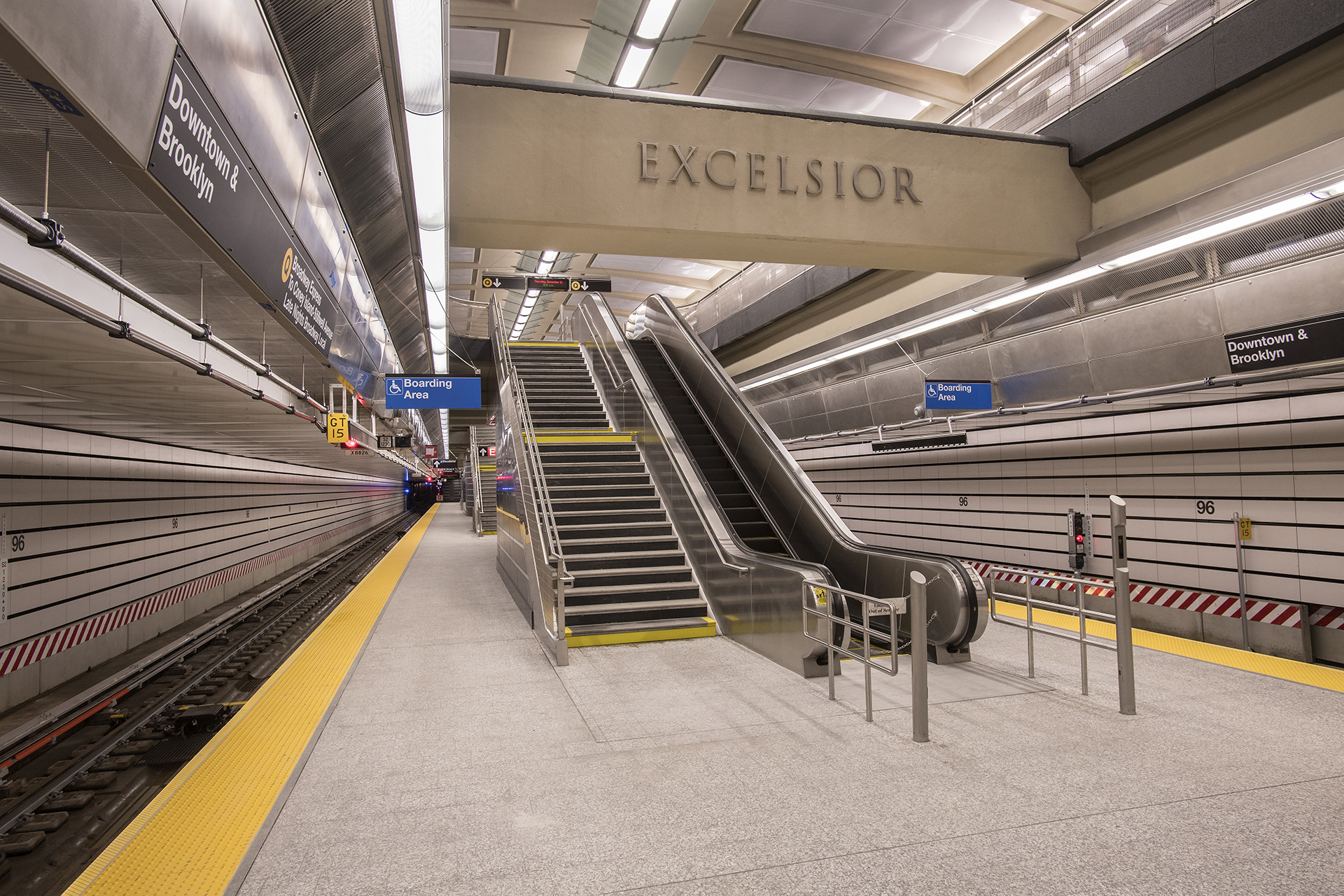
- Platform level

Station statistics
- Address: 96th Street & Second Avenue; New York, New York
- Borough: Manhattan
- Locale: Upper East Side (Carnegie Hill and Yorkville); East Harlem
- Coordinates: 40.7841°N 73.9472°W
- Division: B (IND)
- Line: IND Second Avenue Line
- Services: N (limited rush hour service only); Q (all times); R (one weekday a.m. rush hour trip in the northbound direction only)
- Transit: NYCT Bus: M15, M15 SBS, M96; MTA Bus: BxM1, BxM7, BxM10; NYC Ferry: Soundview route (at East 90th Street and East End Avenue)
- Structure: Underground
- Platforms: 1 island platform
- Tracks: 2

Other information
- Opened: January 1, 2017; 9 years ago
- Accessible: Yes

Traffic
- 2025: 4,421,857 ▲11.1%
- Rank: 73 out of 423
Services
| Preceding station | New York City Subway | Following station |
|---|---|---|
| Terminus | Q (New York City Subway service) | 86th Street N Q toward Coney Island–Stillwell Avenue |
Future services
| 106th Street toward Harlem–125th Street | Q (New York City Subway service) | 86th Street N Q toward Coney Island–Stillwell Avenue |
Location
Location within New York City Subway
Location within New York City
Location within New York
Track layout
Street map
Station service legend
| Symbol | Description |
| Stops all times | Stops all times |
| Stops rush hours only (limited service) | Stops rush hours only (limited service) |
| Stops rush hours in the peak direction only (limited service) | Stops rush hours in the peak direction only (limited service) |
| Stops weekends and weekday evenings | Stops weekends and weekday evenings |

The 96th Street station (also known as the 96th Street–Second Avenue station) is a station on the IND Second Avenue Line of the New York City Subway. Located at the intersection of Second Avenue and 96th Street on the border of the Upper East Side/Yorkville and East Harlem neighborhoods in Manhattan, it is the northern terminus for the first phase of the Second Avenue Line. The station is served by the Q train at all times, as well as limited N trains and one northbound a.m. R train during rush hours; all three routes terminate at the station. There are two tracks and an island platform.

The station was not originally proposed as part of the Program for Action in 1968, but a later revision to that plan entailed building a Second Avenue Subway with one of its stops located at 96th Street. Construction on that project started in 1972, but stalled in 1975 due to lack of funding. In 2007, a separate measure authorized a first phase of the Second Avenue Line to be built between 65th and 105th Streets, with stations at 72nd Street, 86th Street and 96th Street. The station opened on January 1, 2017, as a terminal station, with provisions to extend the line north to Harlem–125th Street in Phase 2. Since opening, the presence of the Second Avenue Subway's three Phase 1 stations has improved real estate prices along the corridor. The 96th Street station was used by approximately 6.2 million passengers in 2019.

The station, along with the other Phase 1 stations along the Second Avenue Subway, contains features not found in most New York City Subway stations. It is fully compliant with the Americans with Disabilities Act of 1990, containing two elevators for disabled access. Additionally, the station contains air conditioning and is waterproofed, a feature only found in newer stations. The artwork at 96th Street is "Blueprint for a Landscape", a mural by Sarah Sze.

== History ==
=== Background ===
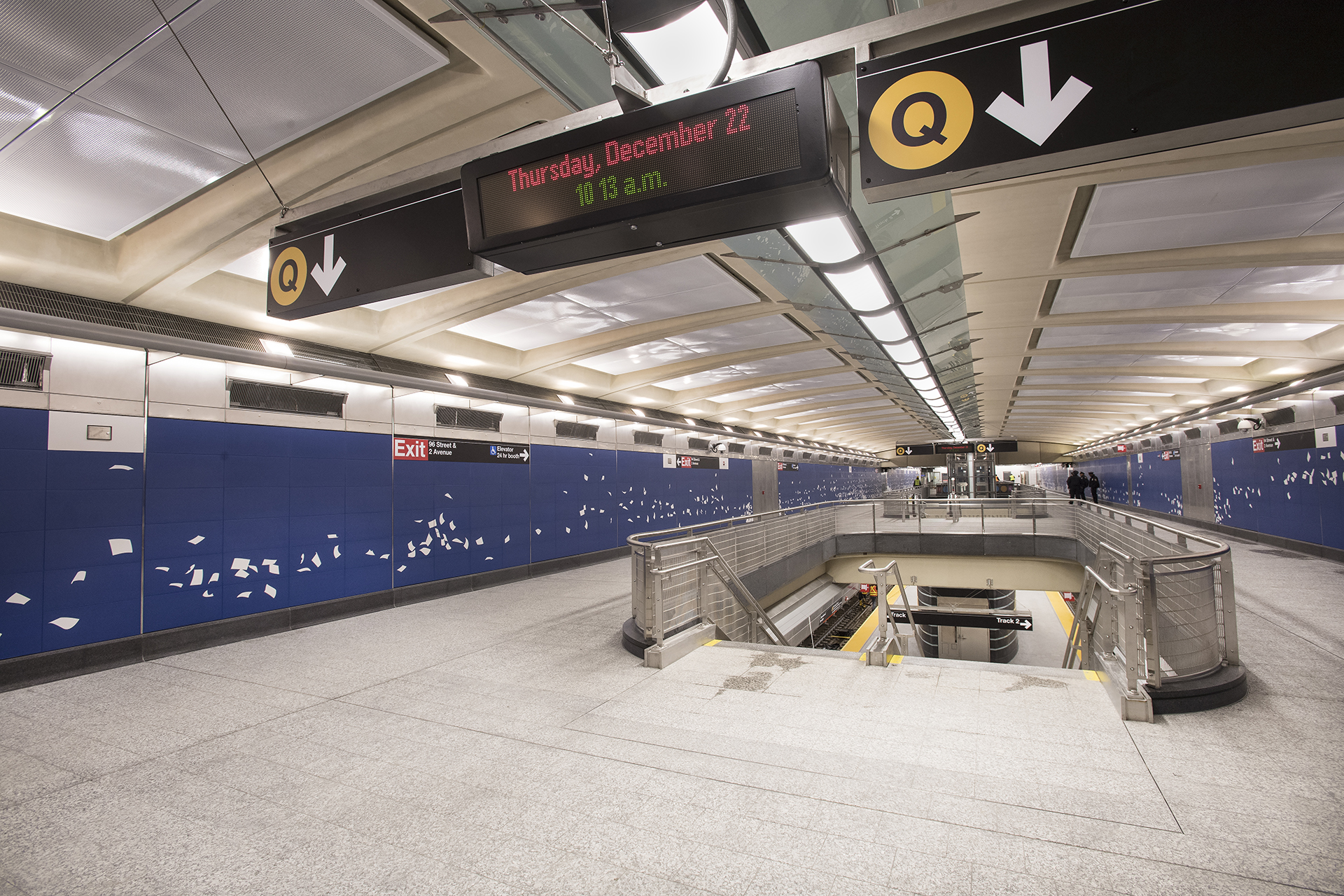
Mezzanine level

The Second Avenue Line was originally proposed in 1919 as part of a massive expansion of what would become the Independent Subway System (IND). Work on the line never commenced, as the Great Depression of 1929 crushed the economy. Numerous plans for the Second Avenue Subway appeared throughout the 20th century, but these were usually deferred due to lack of funds. In anticipation of the never-built new subway line, the Second and Third Avenue elevated lines were demolished in 1942 and 1955, respectively. The Second Avenue Elevated had one station at 92nd Street and another at 99th Street, and the Third Avenue Elevated had a stop on nearby Third Avenue at 99th Street.

=== Unrealized proposals ===
As part of the New York City Transit Authority's 1968 Program for Action, the construction of the full-length Second Avenue Subway was proposed. It was to be built in two phases—the first phase from 126th to 34th Streets, the second phase from 34th to Whitehall Streets. The line's planned stops in Manhattan, spaced farther apart than those on existing subway lines, proved controversial; the Second Avenue line was criticized as a "rich man's express, circumventing the Lower East Side with its complexes of high-rise low- and middle-income housing and slums in favor of a silk stocking route." People protested for almost a year over the lack of stations at 72nd and 96th Streets; while a Lenox Hill (72nd Street) station was added in October 1970, the 96th Street station was still not in the official plans, despite the proximity of the Metropolitan Hospital Center to the proposed station. In response to public outcry, the MTA announced the addition of a station at 96th Street in 1971.

Many community representatives requested that a station, in addition to those already proposed, be constructed in the vicinity of 96th Street and Second Avenue, principally to serve the Metropolitan Hospital which provides medical service to large numbers of low-income patients.
After considering the testimony presented at the hearing, the New York City Transit Authority adopted a resolution providing for the construction of a station at 96th Street at a cost of approximately $10,000,000.

All Second Avenue Subway stations built under the Program for Action would have included escalators, high intensity lighting, improved audio systems, platform edge strips, and non-slip floors to accommodate the needs of the elderly and people with disabilities, but no elevators. Space at each station would have been used for ancillary facilities. The stations were to be made with brick walls and pavers alongside stainless steel, and would have relatively small dimensions, with 10-foot (3.0 m) mezzanine ceilings. Damaz & Weigel received a contract for the design of the 96th Street station.

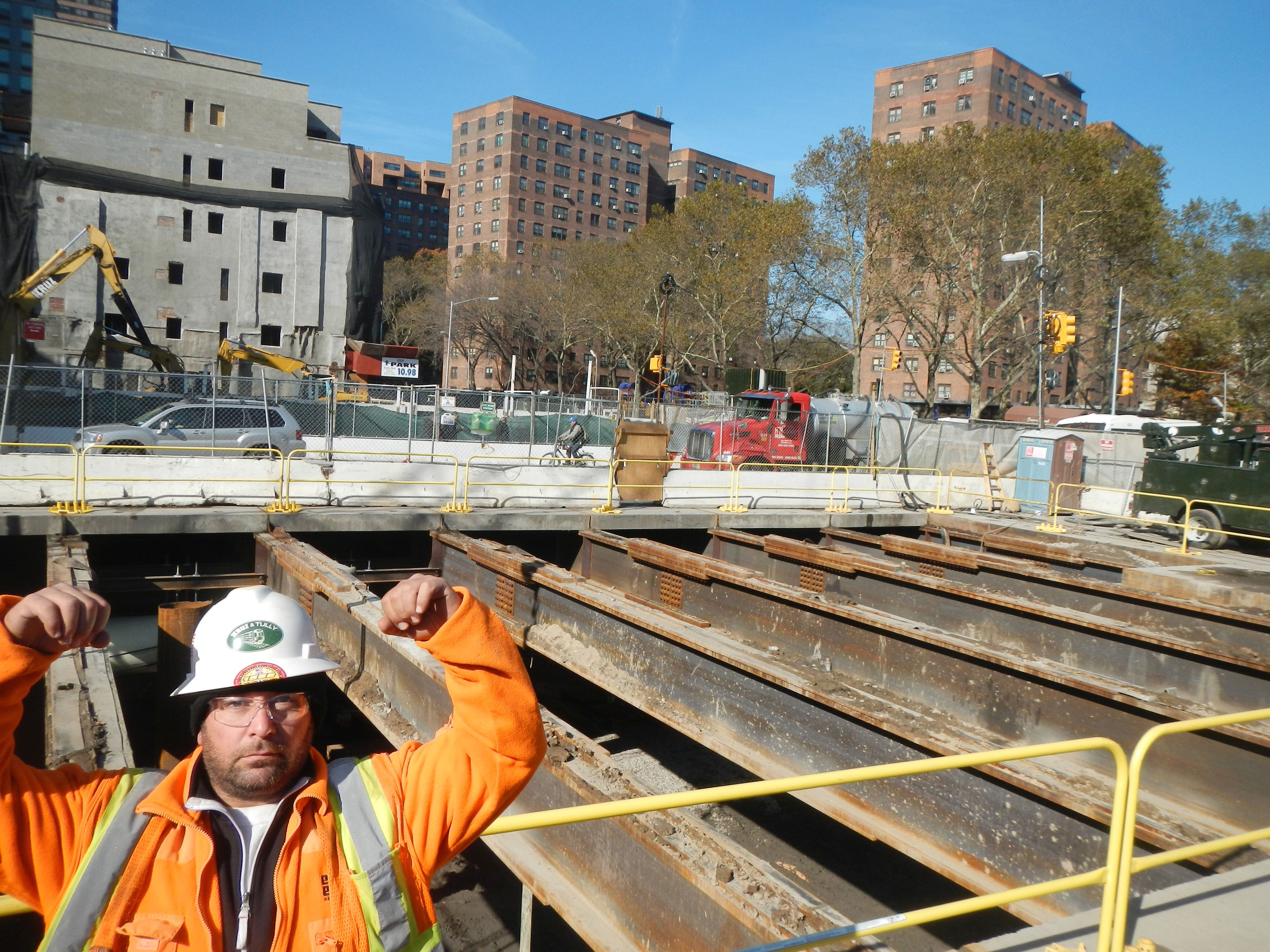
Work above ground, November 2012

A combination of Federal and State funding was obtained, and despite the controversy over the number of stops and route, a groundbreaking ceremony was held on October 27, 1972, at Second Avenue and 103rd Street. Construction began shortly thereafter on what was to be the 99th–105th Streets segment, which was projected to cost $17.48 million (worth about $134,542,000 today). However, the city soon experienced its most dire fiscal crisis yet, due to the stagnant economy of the early 1970s, combined with the massive outflow of city residents to the suburbs, and in September 1975 construction on the line stopped, and the tunnels were sealed. Over the next few decades, the MTA regularly inspected and maintained the tunnel segments (spending $20,000 a year by the early 1990s), to maintain the structural integrity of the streets above, and in case construction would ever resume. Trespassers would often camp in the tunnels until the MTA increased security.

In 1999, the Regional Plan Association considered a full-length Second Avenue Subway, which include 96th Street as one of its planned 31 stations. The station would serve the Metropolitan Hospital at 97th Street and the then-new high-rise buildings south of 96th Street.

=== Construction ===
In March 2007, plans for the construction of the Second Avenue Subway were revived. The line's first phase, the "first major expansion" to the New York City Subway in more than a half-century, included three stations in total (at 72nd, 86th, and 96th Streets), which collectively cost $4.45 to $4.5 billion. Its construction site was designated as being from 105th Street and Second Avenue to 63rd Street and Third Avenue. The MTA awarded a $337 million contract—one that included constructing the tunnels between 92nd and 63rd Streets, building a launch box for the tunnel boring machine (TBM) at 92nd to 95th Streets, and erecting access shafts at 69th and 72nd Streets—to Schiavone Construction, Skanska USA Civil, and J.F. Shea Construction. The line's construction commenced on April 15, 2007, In April 2007, the second round of planning for the station was finalized.

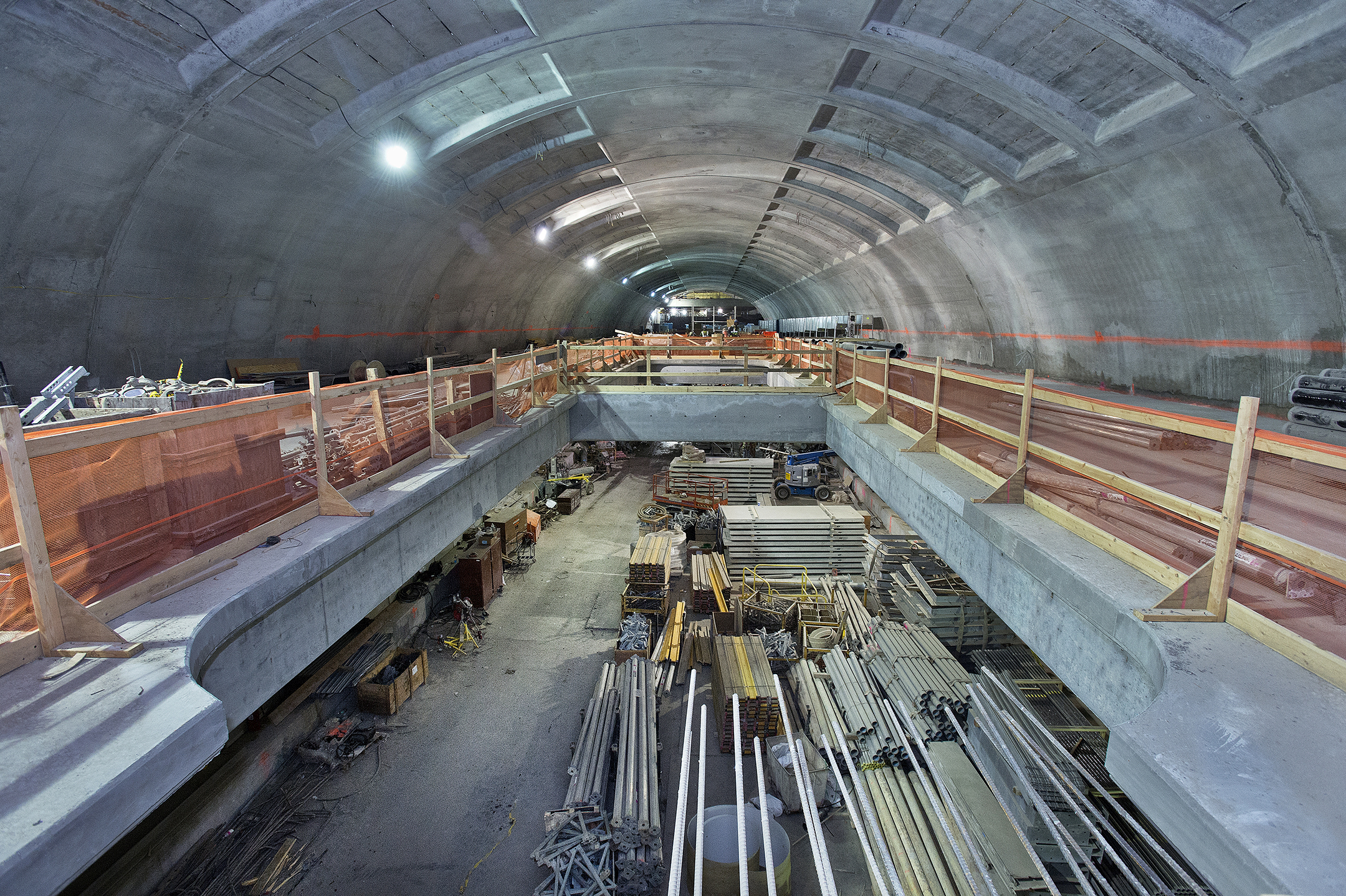
Station cavern construction in December 2014

A ceremonial ground-breaking for the Second Avenue Subway was held on April 12, 2007, three blocks north of the station. The contractor prepared the initial construction site at 96th Street on April 23, 2007. A TBM was originally expected to arrive six to eight months after construction began, but the utility relocation and excavation required to create its "launch box" delayed its deployment from 96th Street down to 63rd Street until May 2010. The forced evacuation of two buildings near the 96th Street station delayed the contractor's plan to use controlled blasting to remove bedrock in the southern section of the launch box. The station itself could not be bored because of the soft soil there. Instead, slurry or diaphragm walls, 1.1 meters (3.6 ft) wide and 6.1 meters (20 ft) long and about 35 meters (115 ft) deep, were built alongside the sections between East 93rd and 95th Streets. Between East 91st and 93rd Streets, where the rock becomes shallower, 1.1-meter-diameter (3.6 ft) secant piles did the same work at shallower depths. Earth excavation was conducted between walls once they were installed, and box structures were built using a bottom-up construction method. Temporary decking constituted the top of the boxes, and the decking both braced the excavation and supported the walls and Second Avenue traffic.

By the beginning of 2012, the slurry wall for the station site was being taken down. On June 25, 2012, a $324.6 million contract was awarded to E.E. Cruz and Company and Tully Construction Company for the station's plumbing, electricity, ancillaries, and entrances. In March 2013, the bulkhead separating the new construction from the 1970s-era tunnel at 99th Street was completed.

On March 19, 2013, a construction worker got stuck in waist-deep muck at the station site; he was extricated after four hours of rescue efforts, but nearly died after the incident.

In mid-2013, work had resumed in the tunnel segment between 99th Street and 105th Street, involving the addition of track and signals, mechanical and plumbing equipment, and upgrading the tunnels to meet modern fire code standards. As of November 2013, the station was 65% excavated. Rails for the line had arrived and were being stored in the station cavern; about one-third of the rails for the line had arrived by then, enough for tracks to be laid from 105th to 87th Streets. By spring 2014, the mezzanine was completed, and roof slabs were being installed; tracks and signal brackets were also installed north of the station. By April 2015, the station was 67% complete, and by April 2016, the station was 91% complete. The station was scheduled to be completed by June 2016, but this was later pushed back to fall 2016.

On December 22 and 23, as part of an open house hosted by the MTA, the public was invited to tour the 96th Street station before it opened, to generally positive acclaim. The station opened on January 1, 2017.

=== Phase Two ===
Phase 2, which does not have a set timetable for construction, is planned to extend service from 96th Street to Harlem–125th Street. During Phase 2, both East Harlem segments, between 99th Street and 105th Street, and between 110th Street and 120th Street will be connected, modified, and used for normal train service. In 2007, the MTA reported that the segments were in pristine condition. Under the approved plan, the MTA estimates to complete Phase 2 between 2027 and 2029, by which the Q and rush-hour N trains will be extended to Harlem–125th Street.

== Station layout ==
The 96th Street station is served by Q trains at all times as well as limited N trains and one northbound a.m. R train during rush hours. This station is the northern terminus of the Second Avenue Subway; the next stop to the south is 86th Street. It has two tracks and an island platform. The station is built so that it is more wide open than most other underground subway stations in the system. Its design was likened to a Washington Metro station by Michael Horodniceanu, President of MTA Capital Construction. The platform is approximately 49 feet (15 m) below ground, making the station the shallowest of the three Phase 1 stations. The platform for the 96th Street station, like the other Second Avenue Subway stations, is 27.8 feet (8.5 m) wide. As with other stations on the first phase of the Second Avenue Subway, it was designed and engineered by a joint venture of Arup and AECOM.

The station has air-cooling systems to make it at least 10 °F (6 °C) cooler than other subway stations during the summer. This requires the station to have large ventilation and ancillary buildings, rather than traditional subway grates. The station is also compliant with current fire codes, whereas most existing stations are not. Additionally, the station is waterproofed with concrete liners and fully drained. In early plans, the Second Avenue Subway was supposed to have platform screen doors to assist with air-cooling, energy savings, ventilation, and track safety, but this plan was scrapped in 2012 as cost-prohibitive. According to an internal study prepared for the MTA in 2020, the 96th Street station could theoretically accommodate half-height platform edge doors. Full-height platform screen doors would be possible but would necessitate the installation of structural bracing and relocation of several mechanical systems.

=== Track layout ===
South of the station, underneath 92nd Street, is a diamond crossover allowing northbound trains from track S2 to terminate on either track, then go into the storage tracks or proceed south on track S1. A section of tunnel north of the station, built in the 1970s between 99th and 105th Streets, was renovated. The tail tracks north of the station, which currently end at 99th Street, can store four trainsets, two on each track.

=== Artwork ===
In 2009, MTA Arts & Design selected Sarah Sze from a pool of 300 potential artists to create the artwork for the station. Her work, which was created by Spanish artisans Alcalagres, consists of blue, violet, and lavender landscapes, as well as depictions of wind blowing things around. The artwork is located on 4,300 porcelain wall panels. The installation is permanent.

The piece is called "Blueprint for a Landscape" and consists of a dark-blue landscape of things being blown around as if by an incoming train. A New York Times reporter described it as "fragmented images of scaffolding, birds, chairs and leaves, digitally collaged." Another piece, in simple blue-and-white colors, consists of depictions of billowing sheets of paper. The work also serves the practical purpose of helping navigation, as the sheets are more closely packed together near the exits than in the middle of the station. The work features familiar objects—sheets of paper, scaffolding, birds, trees and foliage—caught up in a whirlwind. Each entrance features a different shade of blue and a blueprint-style vector line design, a visual theme that is integrated with the architecture.

=== Exits and ancillary buildings ===
There are 3 entrances and exits, comprising 6 escalators and one elevator.

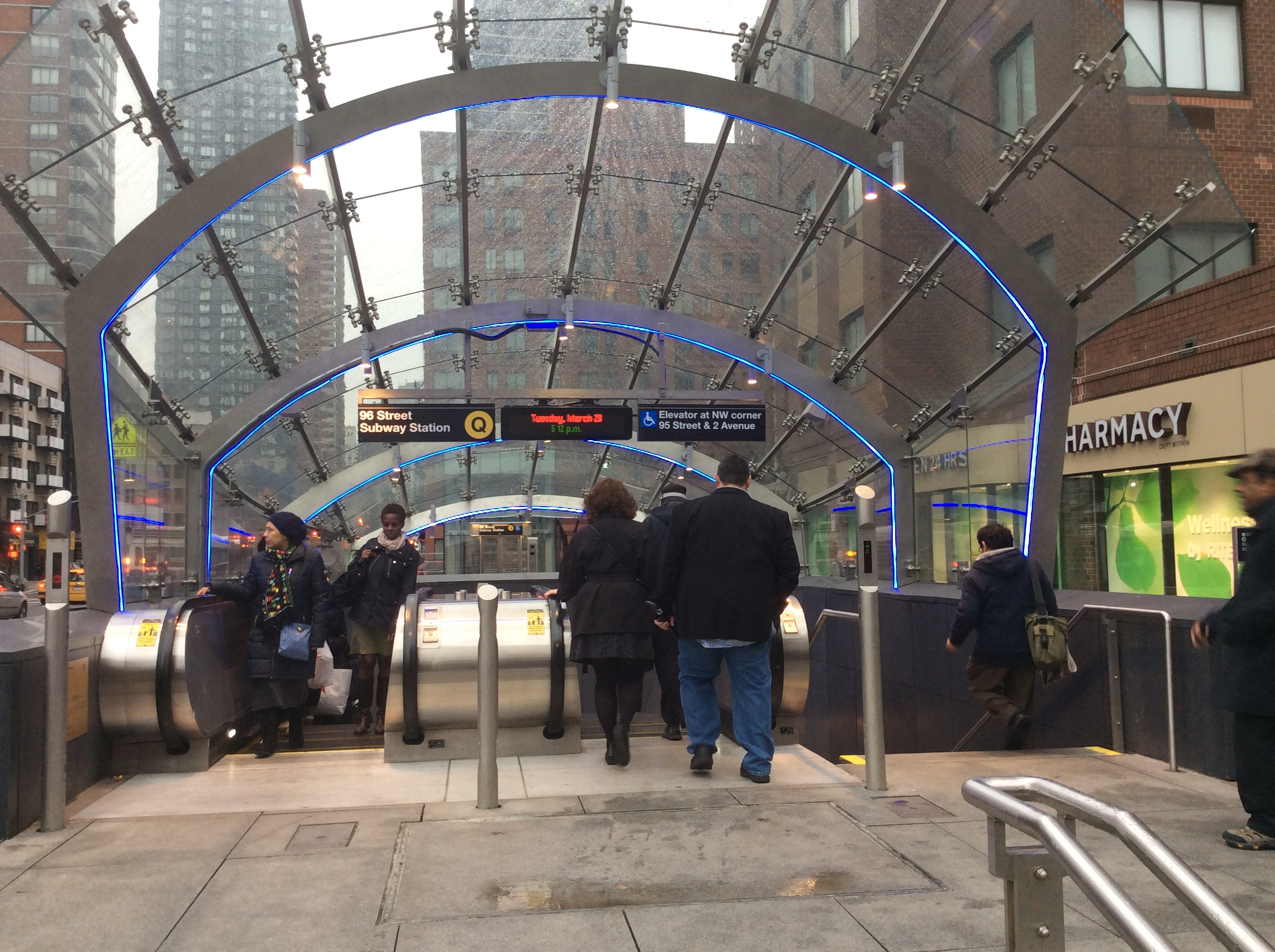
Entrance 3, with blue LEDs lighting up the canopy's supports

| Location | Exit Type | Number of exits |
|---|---|---|
| Entrance 1 Within building, SW corner of Second Avenue and 94th Street | Staircase; Escalator | 1 staircase 1 escalator |
| Entrance 2 Plaza, NE corner of Second Avenue and 94th Street | Escalator | 3 escalators |
| Entrance 3 Second Avenue, west side between 95th Street and 96th Street | Elevator | 1 |
| Entrance 3 Plaza, SW corner of Second Avenue and 96th Street | Staircase; Escalator | 1 staircase 2 escalators |

There are also two ancillary buildings that store station equipment. Ancillary 1 is at the northeast corner of Second Avenue and 93rd Street, while ancillary 2 is at the SW corner of Second Avenue and 97th Street. The Metropolitan Hospital Center is one block to the north of the station's northernmost entrance.

The locations of the station entrances are all south of 96th Street. In 2009, there was a debate over the placement of the location of the street entrances. Because 96th Street divides the neighborhoods of the Upper East Side to the south and East Harlem to the north, some residents of East Harlem stated that their neighborhood was not served by the Second Avenue Subway.

== Effects ==
The surrounding area's real estate prices had been in decline. However, the value of real estate in the area has risen since 2013, with new construction charging a "subway premium." Some businesses near the station's construction site lost profits, but with the opening of the new station, business owners hope to see an increase in patronage.

A writer for The New Yorker called the station area a partially gentrified "traditional dividing line between East Harlem and the Upper East Side". Unlike for the other two Phase 1 stations, rents for buildings in the station area had not reached their maximum. To illustrate the area's transitional condition, the writer stated that the 96th Street station was situated within a few blocks of a high-crime housing development on First Avenue, an old ice-skating rink frequented by "squeegee men" who would demand money from drivers, a tenement where future President Barack Obama lived in the 1980s, the Islamic Cultural Center of New York, as well as the Mayor of New York City's residence at Gracie Mansion.

== Nearby places ==
- Islamic Cultural Center of New York
- Metropolitan Hospital Center
