= The Mount (Lenox, Massachusetts) =

Historic house in Massachusetts, United States

- U.S. National Register of Historic Places
- U.S. National Historic Landmark
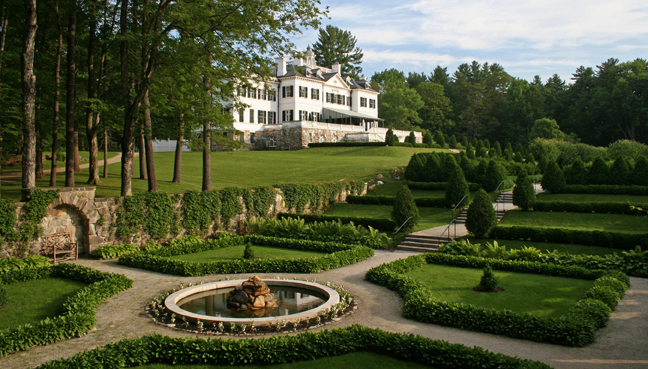
- Edith Wharton's The Mount

- Location within Massachusetts
- Interactive map showing the location for the Mount
- Location: 2 Plunkett Street, Lenox
- Nearest city: Lenox, Massachusetts
- Coordinates: 42.3311°N 73.2820°W
- Built: 1902
- Architect: Ogden Codman, Jr. and Francis L.V. Hoppin
- NRHP reference No.: 71000900

Significant dates
- Added to NRHP: November 11, 1971
- Designated NHL: November 11, 1971

The Mount (1902) is a country house in Lenox, Massachusetts, the home of noted American author Edith Wharton, who designed the house and its grounds and considered it her "first real home." The estate, located in The Berkshires, is open to the public. The property was declared a National Historic Landmark in 1971.

Today, The Mount is a cultural center and historic house museum, welcoming over 50,000 visitors each year. Visitors can explore the property and learn about Edith Wharton by taking tours of the house and gardens and are invited to sit in and interact with the rooms without obstruction. Interpretive exhibits throughout the house explore Wharton and her servants’ lives, as well as her humanitarian efforts and literary legacy. The Mount also presents lectures, dramatic readings, theater, music, storytelling, workshops, outdoor sculptures, films, and literary panels with over 40 local partner organizations.

== History ==
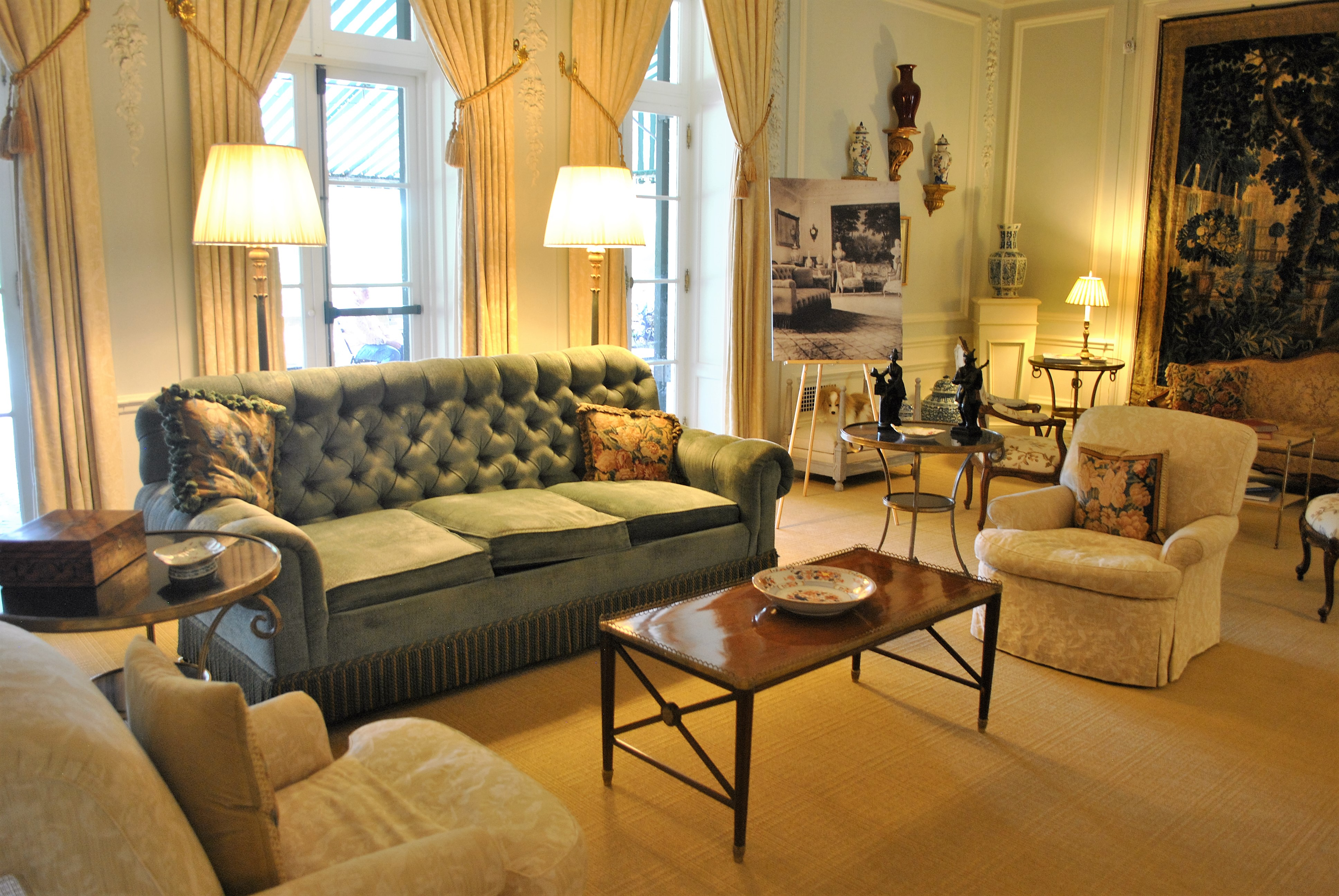
The Mount, Lenox

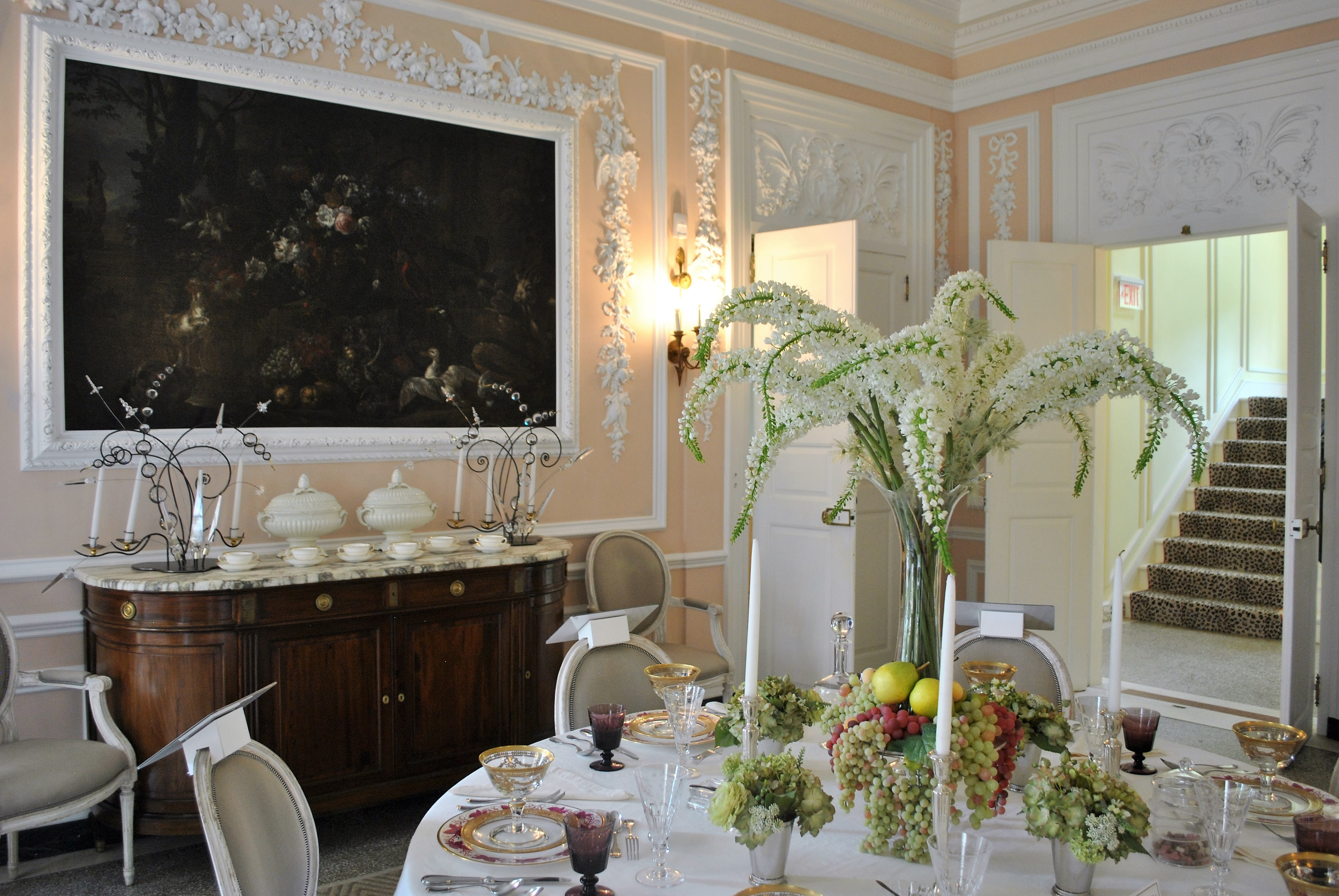
The Mount, Lenox

The Mount's main house was inspired by the 17th-century Belton House in England, with additional influences from classical Italian and French architecture. Edith Wharton used the principles described in her first book, The Decoration of Houses (1897, co-authored with Ogden Codman, Jr.), when she designed the house. She thought that good architectural expression included order, scale, and harmony. Its west (entry) elevation is three stories; on the garden side it is two stories with an opening out to a large, raised, stone terrace overlooking the grounds. The house exterior is a striking white stucco, strongly set off by dark green shutters, and rises from a quasi-rustic foundation of coarse field stone. Clusters of gables and white chimneys rise from the roof, which is capped with a balustrade and cupola. This main house is augmented by Georgian Revival gatehouse and stable, and a beautifully restored Lord and Burnham Greenhouse. Wharton's sometime collaborator, Ogden Codman, Jr., assisted with the initial architectural design and interior decoration, but was eventually dropped because of his "exorbitant" fees. Wharton's niece, the famous garden designer Beatrix Farrand, designed the kitchen garden and the drive.

Edith Wharton and her husband, Edward, lived in the Mount from 1902 to 1911. After the Whartons left, the house was a private residence, a girls' dormitory for the Foxhollow School, and site of the theatre company Shakespeare & Company. It was then bought by Edith Wharton Restoration, which has restored much of the property to its original condition and oversees the running of the property.

The house is situated at the high end of its grounds. The original site was 113 acres (0.46 km^{2}) of farmland, with another 15 acres (61,000 m^{2}) later added. The current estate size is 49.5 acres (200,000 m^{2}). Restored gardens include an Italian walled garden, formal flower garden, alpine rock garden, lime walk, and extensive grass terraces.

Today, in addition to being a historic house, The Mount is a major tourist attraction in the Berkshires of Western Massachusetts. It has been featured in several high-end magazines including an eight-page spread shot by photographer Annie Leibovitz for the fall 2012 issue of Vogue, with a foreword by Colm Tóibín. In recent years, The Mount has become a literary hub, hosting an array of events including readings, book launches, and panel discussions. Author appearances have included: Tom Reiss, Billy Collins, David McCullough, Megan Marshall, Lily Koppel, Adam Gopnik, Kate Bolick, Garrison Keillor, John Berendt.

== Paranormal activity ==
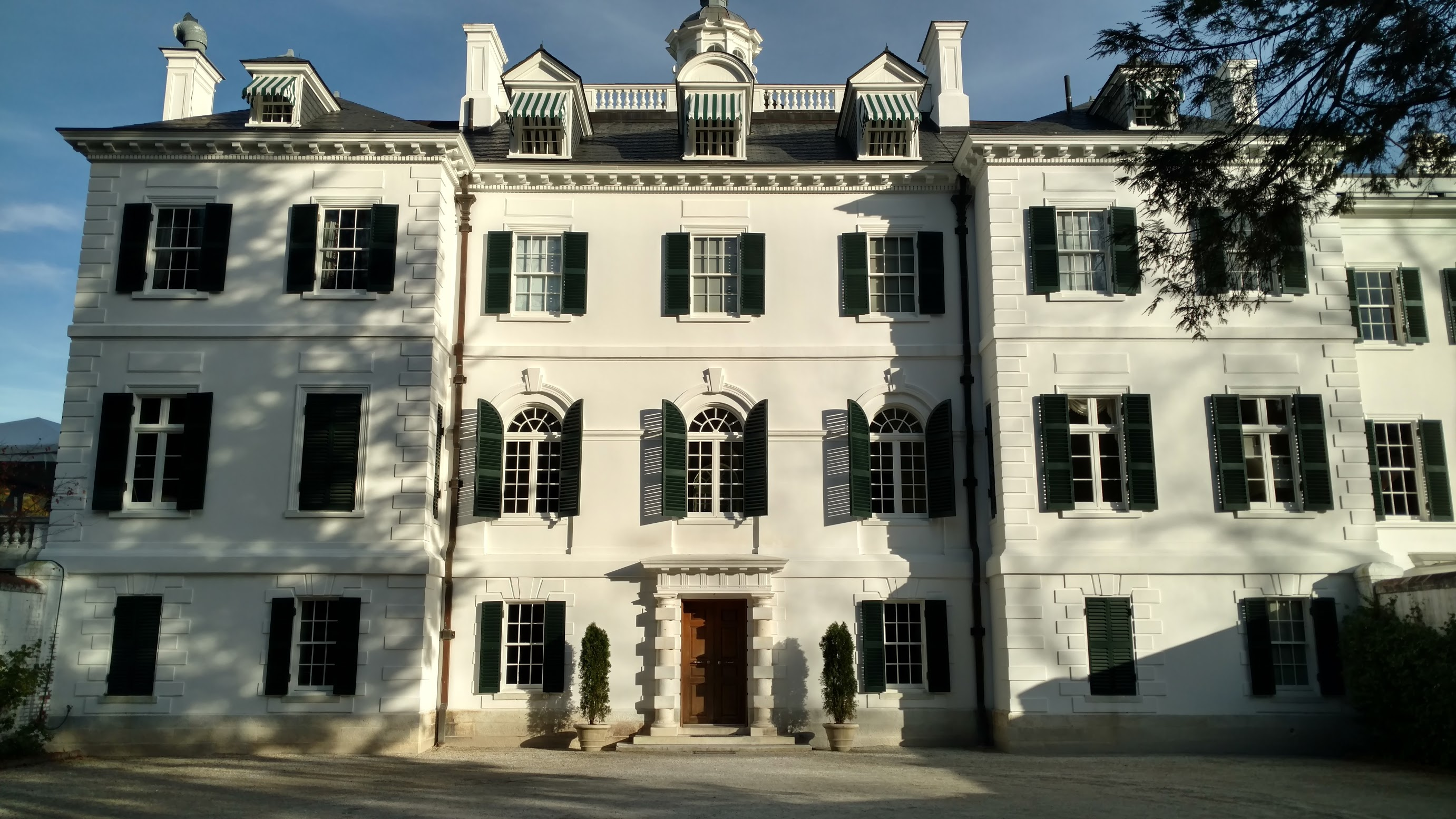
Front Entrance of The Mount, 2017

In 1942 The Mount became part of the Foxhollow School for Girls, and residents reported unexplained noises and experiences in the living areas of the mansion. Following the school's closure in 1976, the mansion remained vacant for several years until Shakespeare & Company used it as a dormitory and performance space. Actors reported the same unexplained sounds and sightings of figures in period dress. In early 2009, the SyFy television show Ghost Hunters filmed an episode at The Mount, and over the course of three days reported audio and visual evidence of activity, such as the sounds of footsteps in an otherwise empty room, and disembodied voices. The show did a follow-up episode in 2015.

== See also ==
- Ventfort Hall Mansion and Gilded Age Museum
- Chesterwood (Massachusetts)
- Naumkeag
- National Register of Historic Places listings in Berkshire County, Massachusetts
- List of National Historic Landmarks in Massachusetts
- List of residences of American writers
- List of Gilded Age mansions
- Steepletop
