= Château de Grégy =

Coordinates: 48°40′1″N 2°37′7″E

The Château de Grègy is a château in Évry-Grégy-sur-Yerre, Seine-et-Marne, France.

The first château was built in 1620 by Antoine de Brennes; two towers remain. Antoine de Clairambault rebuilt the central portion at the beginning of the 19th century, and added wings connecting the tower of a former church to the main building. American decorator and architect Ogden Codman, Jr. owned the château in the 20th century, adding its entry pavilions.

The château is situated along the river Yerres, and is reached via the Pont Saint-Pierre (17th century).
