= Ogden Codman House =

House in Manhattan, New York

Coordinates: 40°47′16″N 73°57′18″W

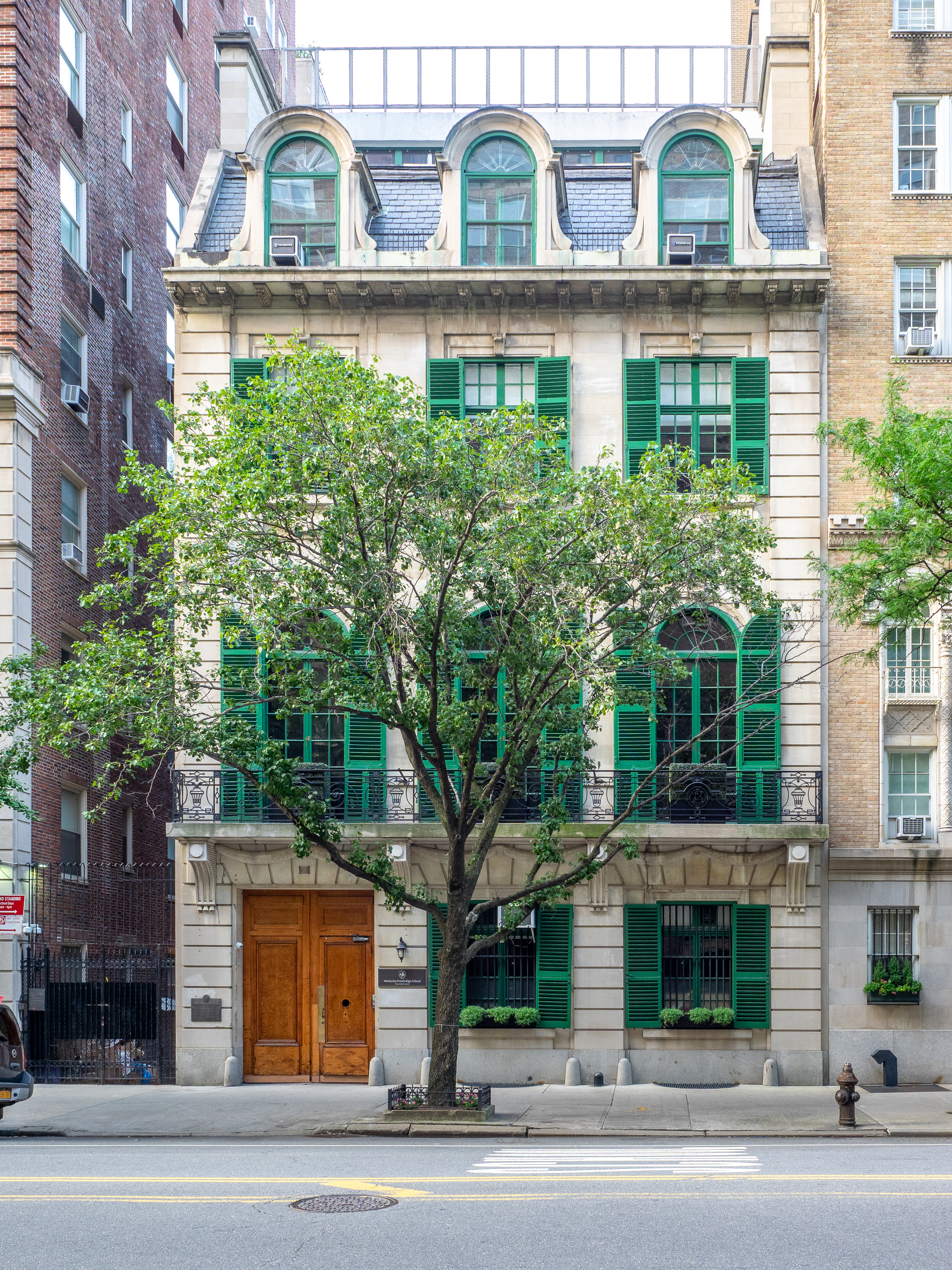
Ogden Codman Jr. House (2019)

The Ogden Codman House at 7 East 96th Street between Fifth and Madison Avenues was built in 1912-13 as a residence for the architect and decorator, Ogden Codman Jr. The building is located on the border between the Carnegie Hill and East Harlem neighborhoods of Manhattan, New York City. Codman designed it himself in the 18th century French Renaissance Revival style. It was formerly the site of the Nippon Club, and later of the Manhattan Country School. Since November 2024, it has been the site of the SAM Elementary School.

Built of limestone, the Codman mansion has been called an "airy frivolity", but the AIA Guide to New York City describes it as "a Parisian townhouse cut down to American 'size'." The building is distinguished by wrought-iron balconies, dormer windows, and a porte-cochère leading to a courtyard and garage.

As one of the last three residences built in the 1910s and still standing in East 96th Street, the building was designated a New York City Landmark on May 25, 1967. It is located within the Upper East Side Historic District.
