= Évry-Grégy-sur-Yerre =

- Commune
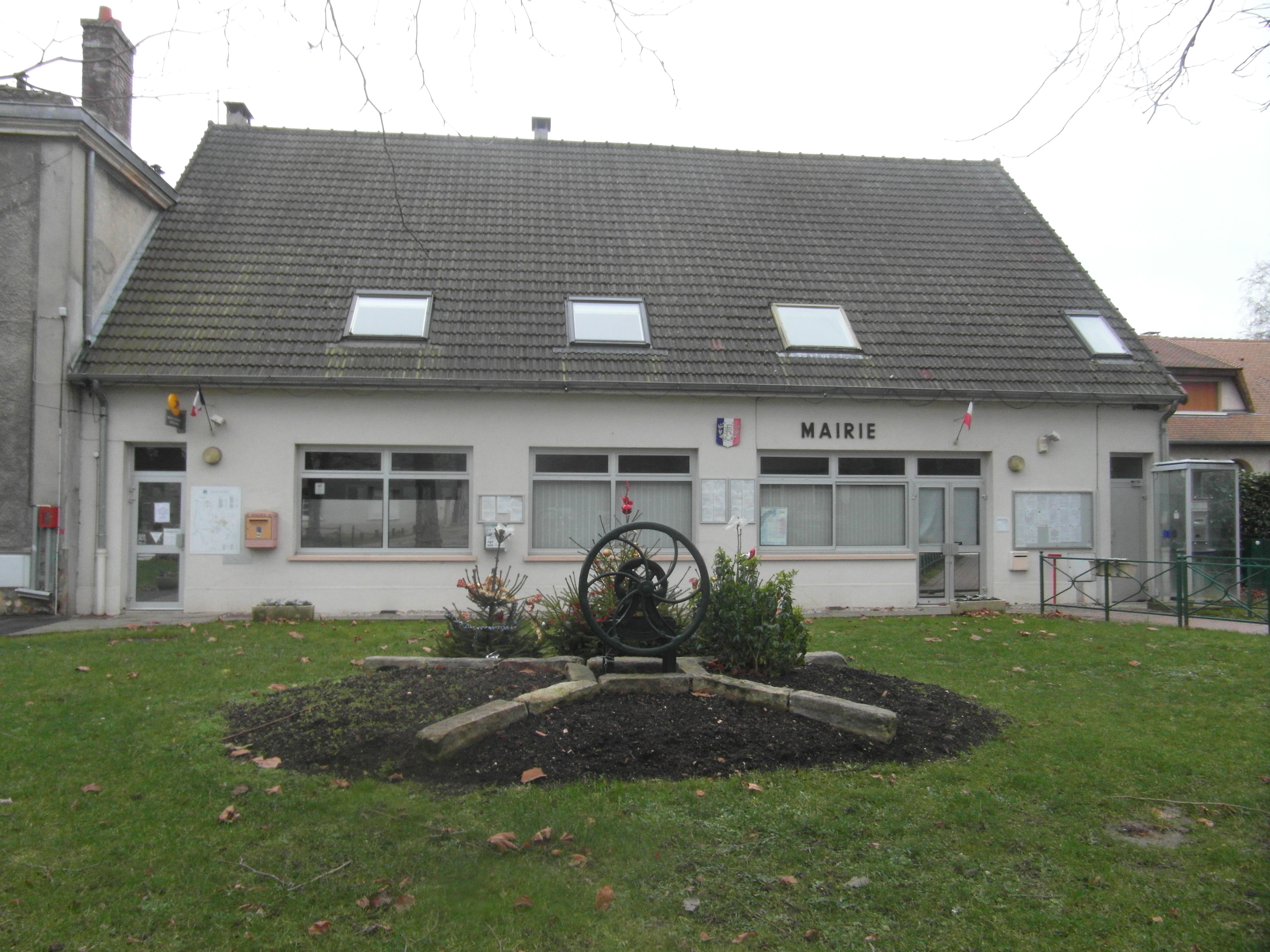
- The town hall

- Coat of arms
- Location of Évry-Grégy-sur-Yerre
- Location within France Location within Île-de-France (region)
- Coordinates: 48°39′06″N 2°37′54″E
- Country: France
- Region: Île-de-France
- Department: Seine-et-Marne
- Arrondissement: Melun
- Canton: Fontenay-Trésigny
- Intercommunality: CC Brie des Rivières et Châteaux

Government
  - Mayor (2020–2026): Daniel Poirier
- Area^{1}: 19.12 km^{2} (7.38 sq mi)
- Highest elevation: 97 m (318 ft)
- Lowest elevation: 50 m (160 ft)
- Population (2023): 3,321
  - Density: 173.7/km^{2} (449.9/sq mi)
- Time zone: UTC+01:00 (CET)
  - Summer (DST): UTC+02:00 (CEST)
- INSEE/Postal code: 77175 /77166
- ^{1} French Land Register data, which excludes lakes, ponds, glaciers > 1 km^{2} (0.386 sq mi or 247 acres) and river estuaries.

Évry-Grégy-sur-Yerre (French pronunciation: [evʁi ɡʁeʒi syʁ jɛʁ]) is a commune in the Seine-et-Marne department in the Île-de-France region in north-central France. It was established on 1 January 1973 from the amalgamation of the communes of Évry-les-Châteaux and Grégy-sur-Yerre.

== Population ==
Historical population
Year	Pop.	±% p.a.
1968	736	—
1975	805	+1.29%
1982	1,605	+10.36%
1990	1,830	+1.65%
1999	2,041	+1.22%
2007	2,262	+1.29%
2012	2,572	+2.60%
2017	2,866	+2.19%
2023	3,321	+2.49%
Source: INSEE

Inhabitants are called Évéryciens in French.

== See also ==
- Communes of the Seine-et-Marne department
- Château de Grégy
