= 96th Street (Manhattan) =

West-east street in Manhattan, New York

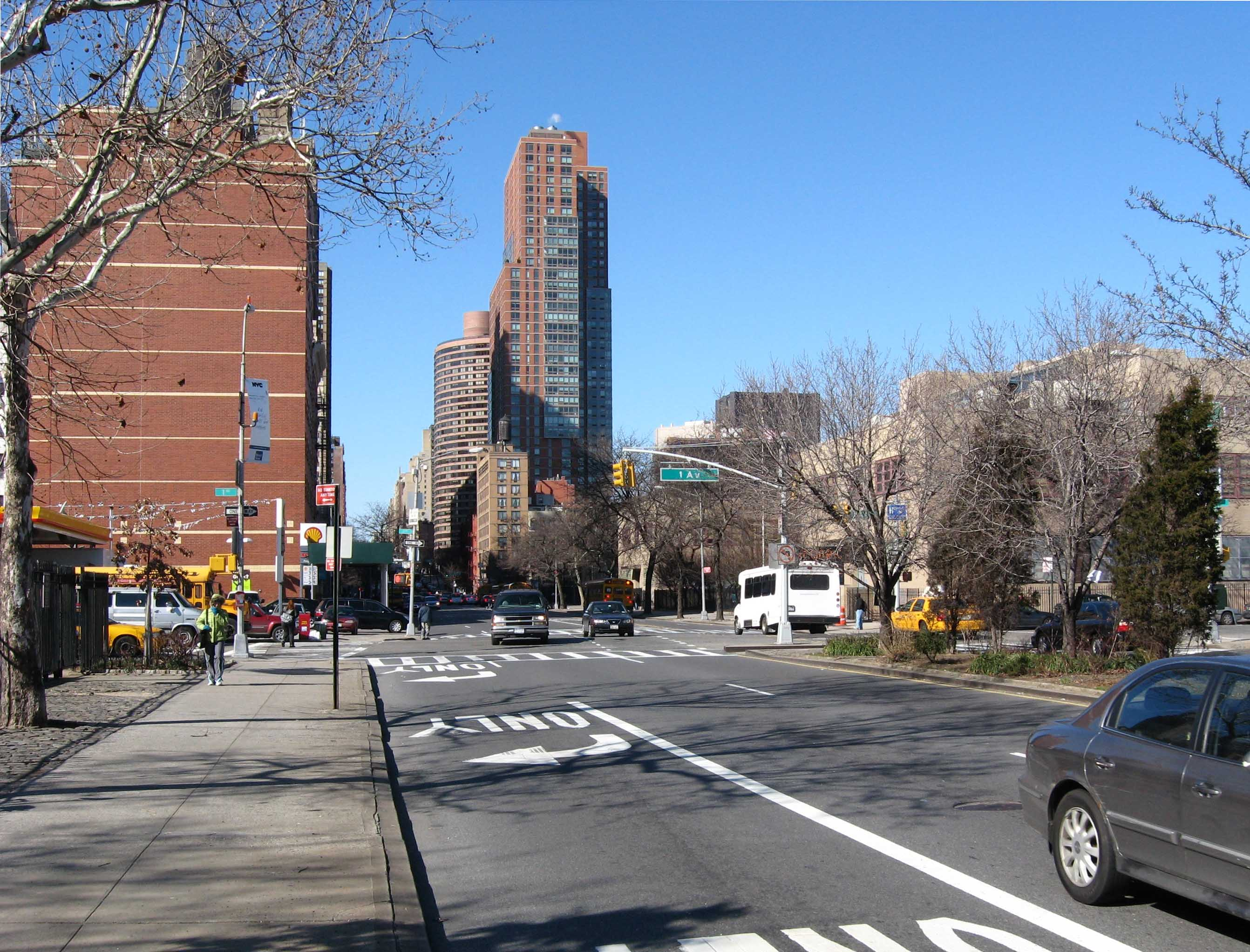
- Crossing First Avenue, looking west
- Owner: City of New York
- Maintained by: NYCDOT
- Length: 1.3 mi (2.1 km)
- Width: 100 feet (30.48 m)
- Location: Manhattan
- Postal code: 10025 (west), 10128 (east)
- Coordinates: 40°47′39″N 73°58′13″W
- West end: NY 9A / Henry Hudson Parkway in Riverside Park
- East end: FDR Drive in East Harlem
- North: 97th Street
- South: 95th Street

Construction
- Commissioned: 1811

96th Street is a major two-way street on the Upper East Side and Upper West Side sections of the New York City borough of Manhattan. It runs in two major sections: between FDR Drive and Fifth Avenue on the Upper East Side, and between Central Park West and the Henry Hudson Parkway on the Upper West Side. The two segments are connected by the 97th Street transverse across Central Park, which links the disconnected segments of 96th and 97th Streets on each side.

96th Street is one of the 15 hundred-foot-wide (30 m) crosstown streets mapped out in the Commissioner's Plan of 1811 that established the numbered street grid in Manhattan. On Manhattan's West Side, 96th Street is the northern boundary of the New York City steam system, the largest such system in the world, which pumps 30 billion pounds of steam into 100,000 buildings south of the street. (The northern boundary on the East Side is 89th Street.)

== East 96th Street ==
From FDR Drive to First Avenue, 96th Street is the northern border of Zone A, a flood evacuation zone. When Hurricane Sandy hit New York City in 2012, residents on neighboring blocks found out they, too, were in a flood zone, and the city revised its zone borders outward. Residents of the public housing projects as well as high rise apartments in the zone were left without power, although it was restored to most of the area after a day or two.

96th Street rises after Second Avenue, and climbs from Third Avenue to Lexington Avenue – called "Carnegie Hill" – before leveling off at Central Park. The street is the traditional dividing line between Yorkville and the Upper East Side to the south and Spanish Harlem or East Harlem to the north.

East 96th Street, particularly near Second and Third Avenues, underwent significant gentrification in the late 1980s. By 2005, a wave of speculation for Harlem real estate pushed a corridor of luxury condos and co-ops up First Avenue from 96th Street as well. The construction of the Second Avenue Subway, which built a station on the street, disrupted lives and businesses along 96th Street, but its opening in January, 2017, was expected to further increase residential and commercial development in East Harlem, as well as increasing housing value in Yorkville.

The Islamic Cultural Center of New York opened at Third Avenue and East 96th Street in 1991. Like all mosques, it is oriented toward Mecca, which required a slight shift in orientation from the neighboring buildings.

The East 96th Street gate to Central Park is called "Woodmans Gate".

East 96th Street is the southern boundary of the area where green taxis may be hailed by passengers.

== West 96th Street ==
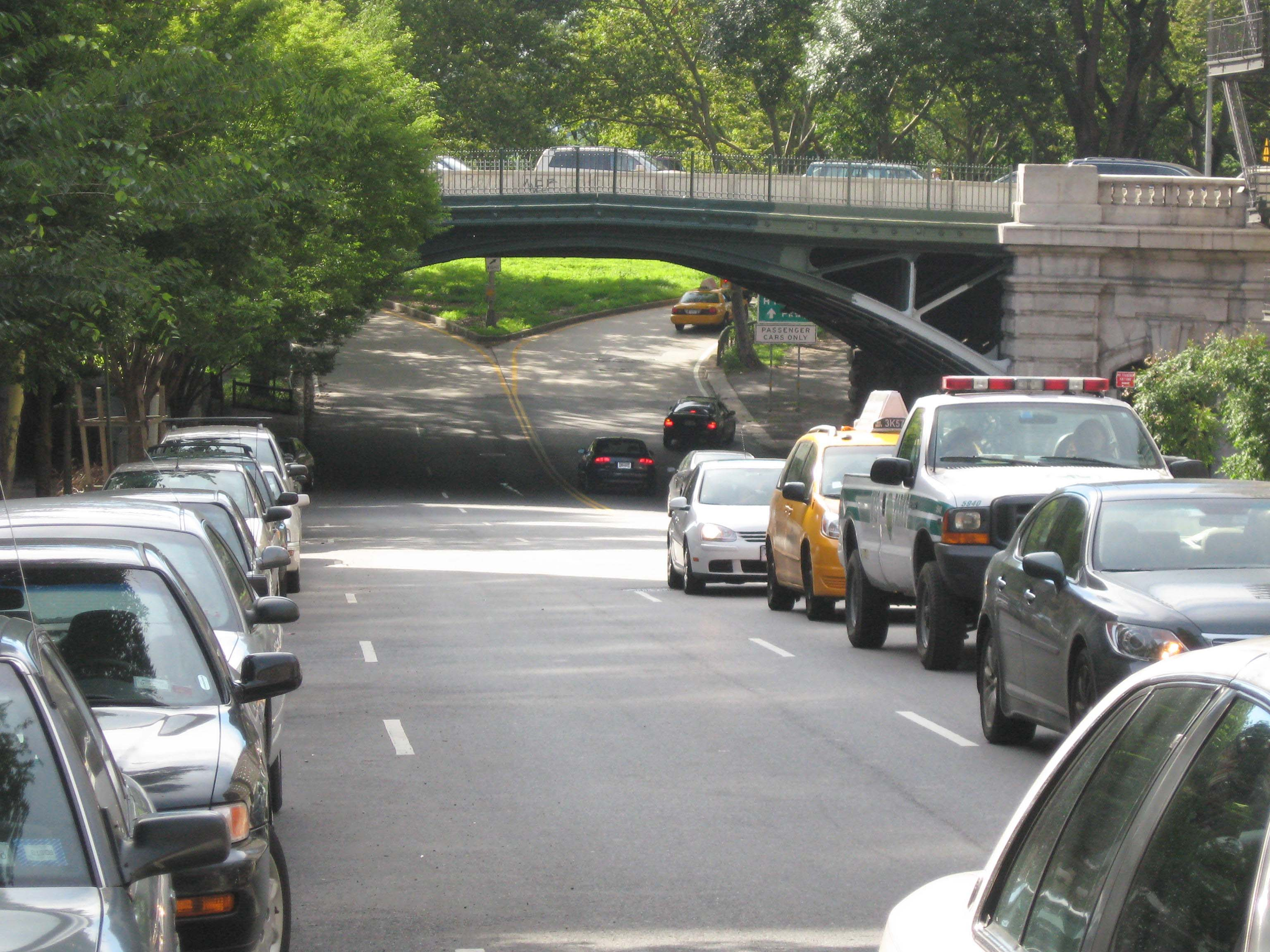
96th Street runs under Riverside Drive near its western end

On the West Side, 96th Street runs through a natural valley passing under Riverside Drive and leading down to the former Stryker's Bay. It is regarded as the southern border of the nearby Manhattan Valley area.

Broadway at West 96th Street was home to two ornate theaters – the Riverside and the Riviera / Japanese Gardens – each designed in the early 20th century, and both gone by 1976.

In the mid 1980s, parts of West 96th Street began to convert from rental units to cooperative housing. At the time, crime remained a problem. As late as the early 1990s, drug dealing was rampant on 96th Street between Broadway and Amsterdam Avenue, and Larry Hogue, a homeless crack addict known as the "Wild Man of 96th Street" terrorized the street for several years until being forced into treatment and extended state custody. In 2009, Hogue escaped from custody and returned briefly to West 96th Street before being found and returned to treatment. The decision by the city to continue locating homeless and frequently drug addicted residents in large former Single Room Occupancy hotels (SROs) within a several block radius of West 96th Street and Broadway continues to be controversial.

The rapid development of Columbus Avenue from 96th to 100th Street around 2009 resulted in a burgeoning concentration of large, national chain stores.

The West 96th Street gate to Central Park is called "Gate of All Saints".

== Gallery ==
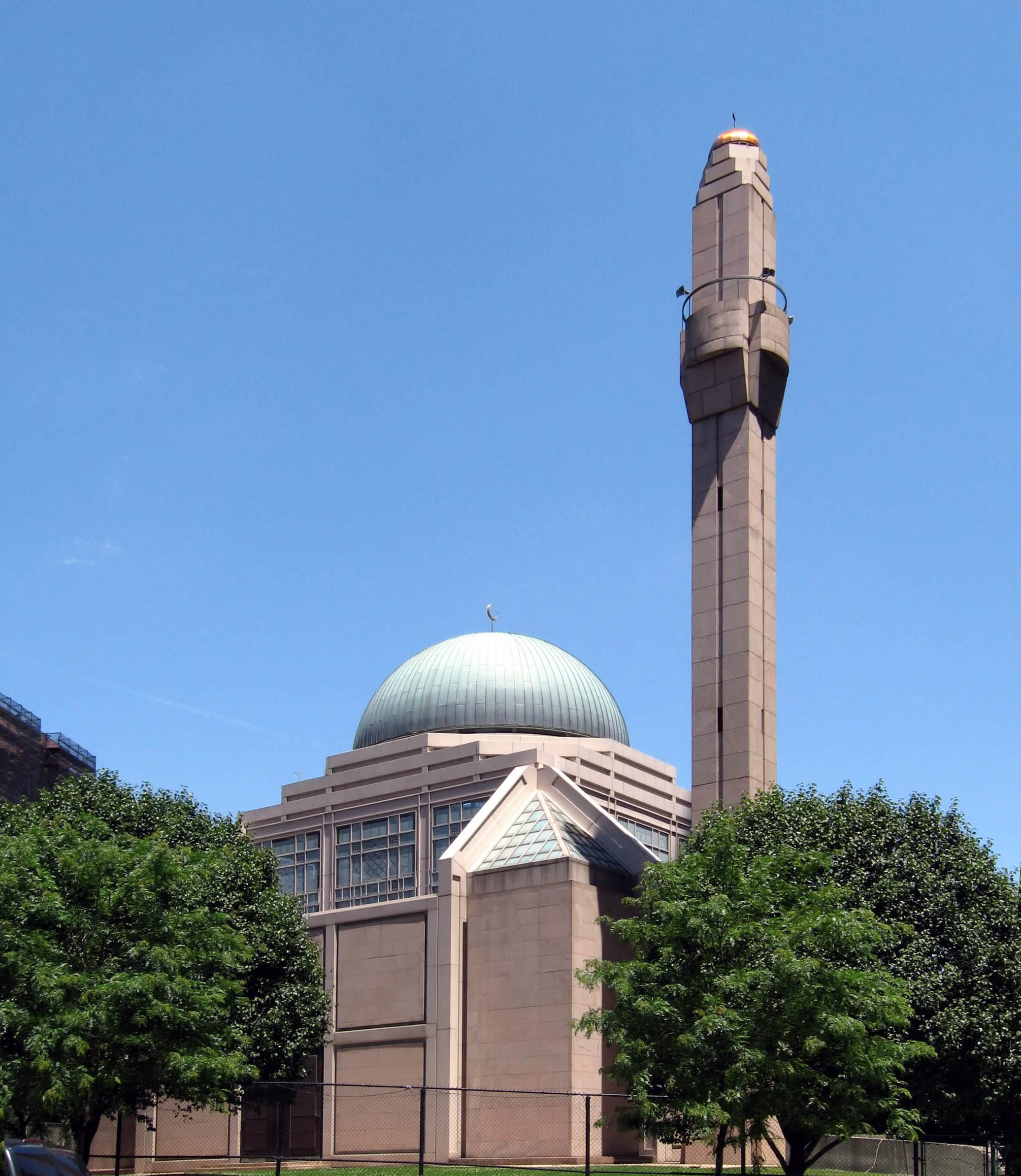
The Islamic Cultural Center at Third Avenue (1991)

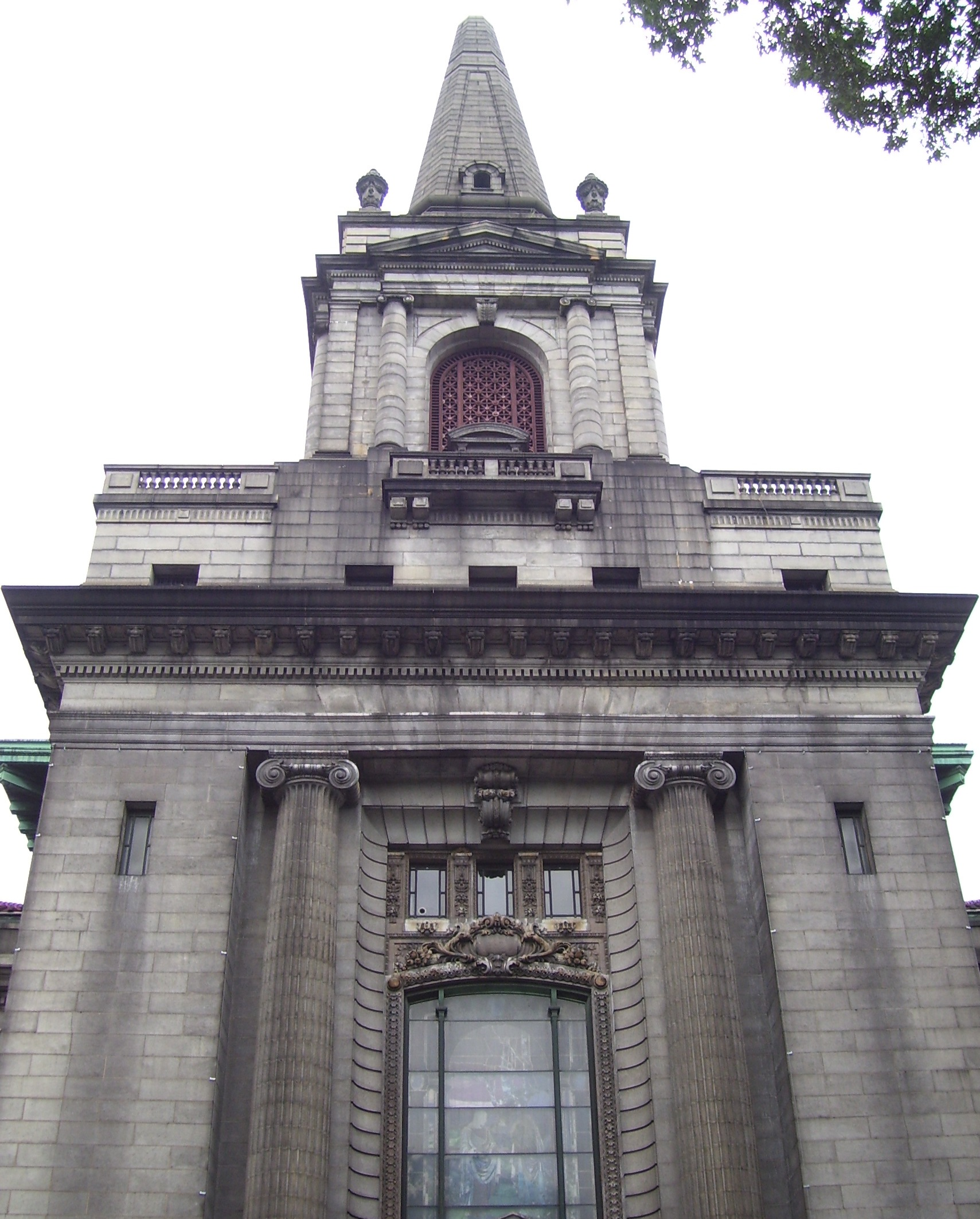
The Crenshaw Christian Center East, formerly the First Church of Christ, Scientist (1899-1903) at 1 West 96th Street and Central Park West

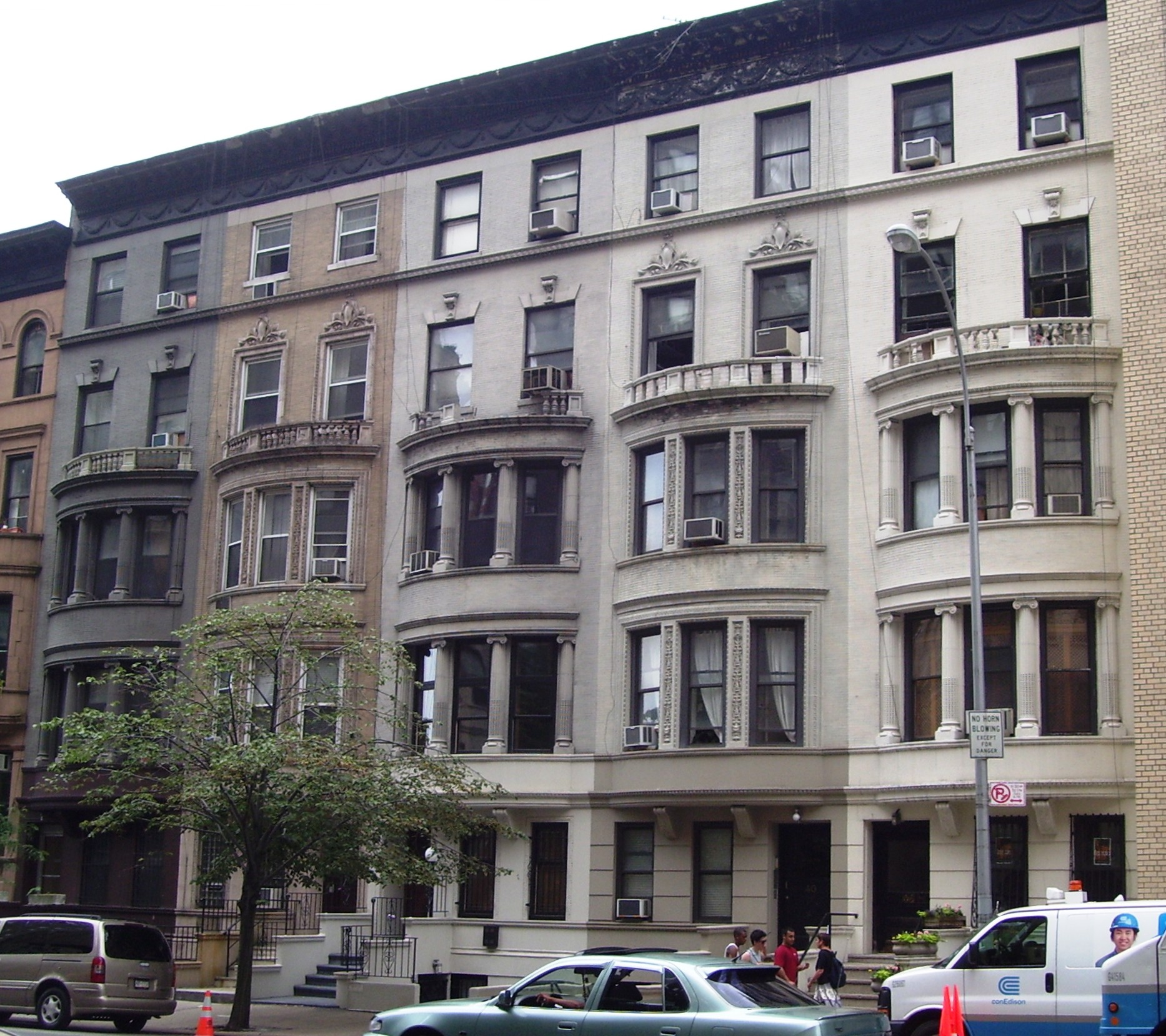
Row houses at 13-42 West 96th Street were built in 1897 and designed by George F. Pelham in the Renaissance Revival style

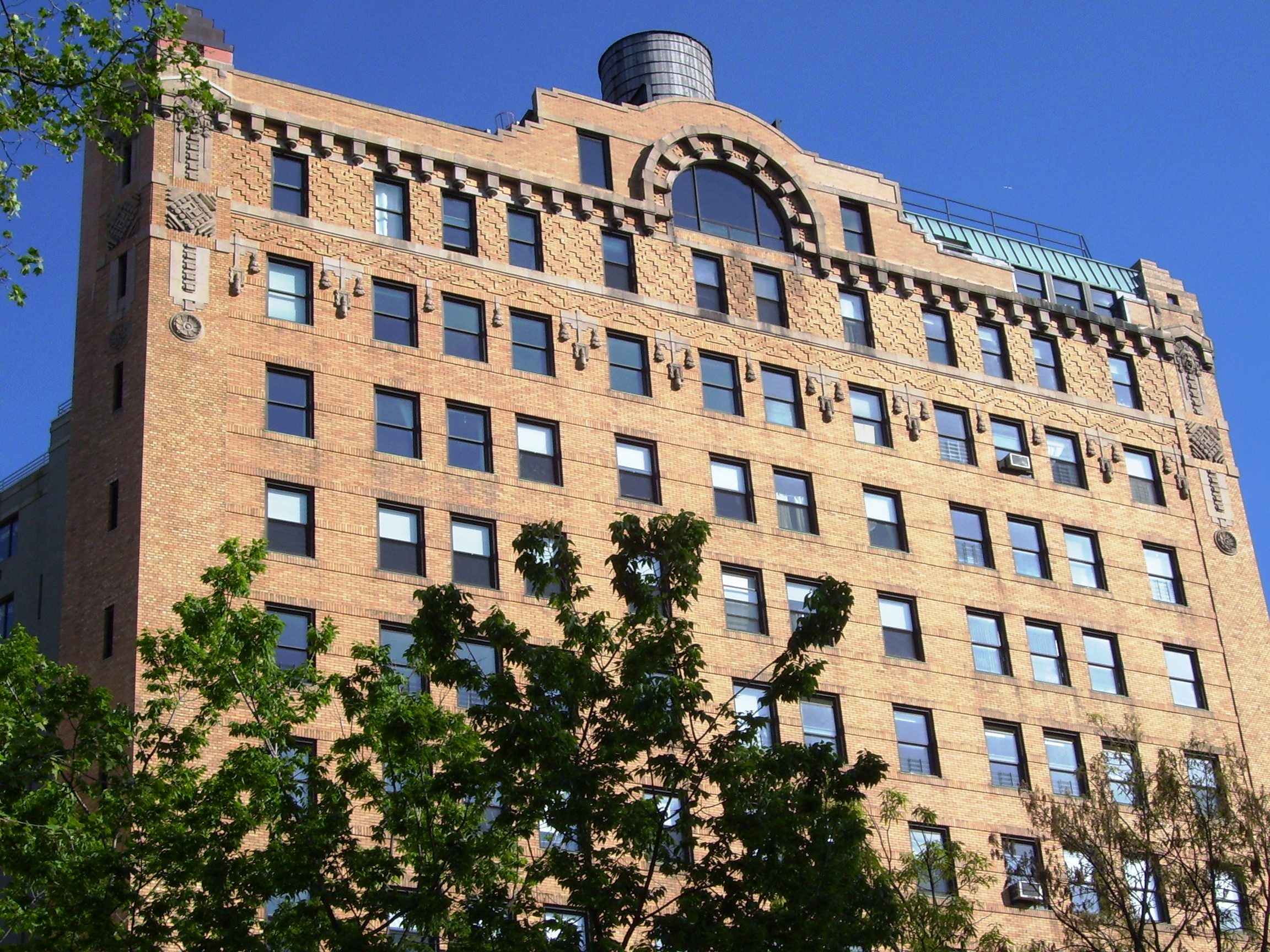
The "Cliff Dwelling", at the intersection with Riverside Drive, was designed by Herman Lee Meader and built in 1914.

== Transportation ==
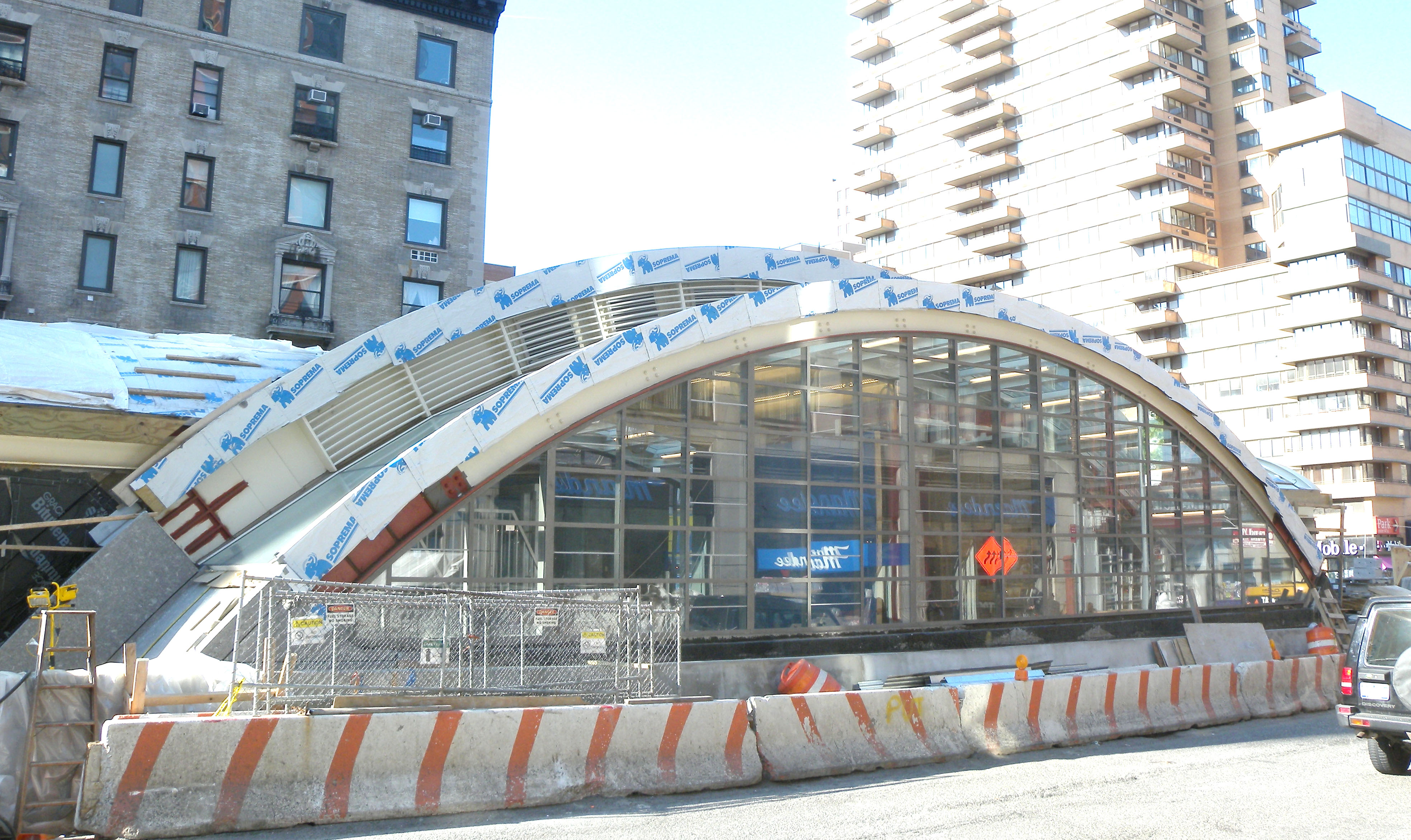
The north entrance to 96th Street station at Broadway

New York City Subway service is available at these stations:

- 96th Street, serving the 1, 2, and 3 trains at Broadway
- 96th Street, serving the B and C trains at Central Park West
- 96th Street, serving the 6 and <6> trains at Lexington Avenue
- 96th Street, serving the Q train at Second Avenue

The M96 bus line serves 96th Street from West End to First Avenues (eastbound) and from Second Avenue to Broadway (westbound). The M106 duplicates service on the western portion of the street and connects with East 106th Street via Madison Avenue eastbound and Fifth Avenue westbound. In September 2024, the New York City Department of Transportation proposed adding an offset bus lane to 96th Street between West End and First Avenues. Upper West Side residents expressed opposition to the addition of bus lanes from Amsterdam Avenue to Central Park West. The NYCDOT began adding bus lanes between West End and Second Avenues that October, and the bus lanes were completed that December. Local residents filed a lawsuit seeking the bus lanes' removal, but the New York Supreme Court rejected the lawsuit in June 2025.

== In popular culture ==
In the 1989 film When Harry Met Sally..., Harry and Sally are seen buying their Christmas tree from The Plant Shed, a long-established neighborhood store on West 96th Street, near Broadway. A year later, no longer a couple, Sally is seen buying her tree there and trudging home alone with the tree dragging behind her.

In the How I Met Your Mother episode "Last Time in New York", Ted references some misspelled graffiti on the intersection of 96th Street and Amsterdam Avenue. The graffiti read, "YOUR A P***S", which Ted then corrects to "YOU'RE A P***S".

In the 2008 musical "In the Heights"' opening song In the Heights, Usnavi references 96th street when he breaks the fourth wall, while describing how to get to Washington Heights, Manhattan.

In the 2019 series “the boys” they mentioned Broadway and 96th street in their finale episode “blood and bone”

In the 1973 movie The Seven-Ups a famous car chase scene with actor Roy Scheider includes a sequence filmed on West 96th Street from Central Park West to West End Avenue. The chase repeats the same intersections on 96th street several times, specifically the dramatic drop from Amsterdam to Broadway and West End Avenue which makes the cars appear to go aloft as they plunge down the hill.

In Saul Bellow's 1969 novel, Mr. Sammler's Planet, Bellow says of the intersection with Broadway "...Ninety-sixth Street tilted at all four corners, the kiosks and movie houses, the ramparts of wire fastened newspaper bundles, and the colors of panic waving."

In the 1979 cult classic film Warriors, the eponymous gang becomes separated at the 96th Street and Broadway station after being pursued by both cops and a rival group, the Baseball Furies. One Warrior, Fox, is killed at the station after falling in front of an oncoming train; compatriots Swan, Cowboy, Ajax, and Snow flee into Riverside Park. Although the events are said to take place at 96th Street, the underground portions were filmed on the defunct platform at Hoyt–Schermerhorn Streets Station in Brooklyn; the street-level scenes were filmed at the 72nd Street Station.
