= Bangkok Art and Culture Centre censorship incident =

The Bangkok Art and Culture Centre (BACC) is a contemporary arts center in Bangkok, Thailand. In July 2025, following the opening of the "Constellation of Complicity: Visualising the Global Machinery of Authoritarian Solidarity" exhibition on authoritarian governments, the BACC was told by the Bangkok Metropolitan Administration (BMA) that in order for the exhibit to remain open, it had to remove or censor material considered offensive to China. These materials included references to China's treatment of ethnic minorities, including the Uyghur Muslims.

On 24 July 2025, the exhibition opened. Three days later, officials from the Embassy of China in Bangkok and representatives of the BMA, "entered the exhibition and demanded its shutdown”, according to Sai, the exhibition's co-curator. Sai subsequently fled Thailand. Several works were described as "problematic".

In a 30 July 2025 email, the BACC noted "Due to pressure from the Chinese Embassy - transmitted through the Ministry of Foreign Affairs and particularly the Bangkok Metropolitan Administration, our main supporter - we have been warned that the exhibition may risk creating diplomatic tensions between Thailand and China." The BACC subsequently obscured the names of Uyghur, Tibetan, and Hong Kong artists.

== Background ==
The BACC opened in 2008, and is primarily funded by the BMA.

The exhibition was curated by the Myanmar Peace Museum, led by Burmese artist Sai. The exhibition featured works from 10 artists from Myanmar, Iran, Russia, Syria, and other diaspora communities, and features artistic critiques of authoritarian regimes. Artists included Uyghur filmmaker Mukaddas Mijit, Tibetan artist Tenzin Mingyur Paldron, and the Hong Kong duo Clara Cheung and Gum Cheng Yee Man.

The exhibition is scheduled to close on 19 October 2025.

== Censorship ==
On 30 to 31 July 2025, the BACC was told by BMA officials the exhibit would need to remove the videoworks by Paldron and any references to Chinese leader Xi Jinping.

Artist names, including Mijit, Paldron, Cheng, and Gum, were subsequently blacked out. A visit by Reuters to the gallery noted video monitors showed a black screen.

On 6 August 2025, officials from the Chinese Embassy visited the gallery again, requesting an additional flyer from Paldron's exhibition be removed, and reminding the BACC to follow the One China Policy.

== Reaction ==
The censorship was condemned by the gallery's co-curator, Sai, who noted "It is tragically ironic that an exhibition on authoritarian cooperation has been censored under authoritarian pressure. Thailand has long been a refuge for dissidents. This is a chilling signal to all exiled artists and activists in the region."

On 27 July 2025, Sunai Phasuk, a researcher on Thailand in Human Rights Watch's Asia division, tweeted "กร่าง! #สถานทูตจีน กดดันหอศิลป์กรุงเทพฯ ให้ปิดนิทรรศการเรื่อง #ฮ่องกง #อุยกูร์ #ทิเบต", translated to "How audacious! The Chinese embassy is pressuring the Bangkok Art and Culture Centre to shut down the exhibition about #HongKong #Uyghurs #Tibet."

Other Human Rights Watch representatives criticized the censorship on Twitter, characterizing it as "Chinese transnational repression".

The Committee for Freedom in Hong Kong Foundation described the incident as "Another blatant example of #CCP censorship" on Twitter.

On 8 August 2025, Clara Cheung, a Hong Kong artist whose name was censored, wrote on Twitter "As a participating artists in this exhibition, I strongly Condemn China's transnational Censorship in Thailand! The painting shown in Reuters article is part of “Anti-Spy Spy Club” installation by C&G Artpartment. Yet its another example showing what China embassy does".

On 9 August 2025, Thai artist and academic Thasnai Sethaseree released a Facebook statement condemning political pressure by the Embassy and criticizing the BMA and Ministry of Foreign Affairs.

On 9 August 2025, Suchart Sawatsi, former national artist of Thailand, wrote "I protest against the Chinese government's interference with freedom of artistic expression in Thailand." in a Facebook post.

On 10 August 2025, Khaosod English senior staff writer Pravit Rojanaphruk published an op-ed titled "Because I don't want Thailand to become a Chinese vassal state, I must record this: Chinese Embassy censoring BACC art exhibition in Bangkok". Pravit advocated that "Thailand is not a colony or a vassal state of China (or any nation). We should look at neighbouring countries for a sobering lesson. The Chinese Embassy has no right to give orders, and we should not allow them to dictate what can and cannot be displayed at a Thai art centre."

On 11 August 2025, China's Foreign Ministry responded to a request from Reuters, and accused exhibition organizers of distorting its polices on Hong Kong, Tibet, and Xinjiang. The Ministry characterized the exhibit as "having promoted the fallacies of so-called 'Tibetan independence', 'the East Turkestan Islamic Movement' and 'Hong Kong independence'," and "undermined China's core interests and political dignity". The Ministry did not confirm or deny that China was responsible for the removal of artwork.

In a December review of Thailand's art scene in the Bangkok Post, Sukontip Nakasem, founder of Warin Lab Contemporary & La Lanta Fine Art said that, "As BACC was under pressure from a higher power, it censored some words and artist names. The censorship aroused curiosity, so many people searched the exhibition on the internet. Thus, the exhibition gained more recognition. I believe that artists who had their names censored understood the situation. They are intellectually mature."

== See also ==
- China–Thailand relations
- Transnational repression by China
