= List of diplomatic missions in Thailand =

This is the list of diplomatic missions in Thailand. The capital city of Thailand, Bangkok hosts 80 embassies and other diplomatic representations. Major cities such as Chiang Mai, Khon Kaen, and Songkhla are host to consular missions.

Honorary consulates are not included in this listing.

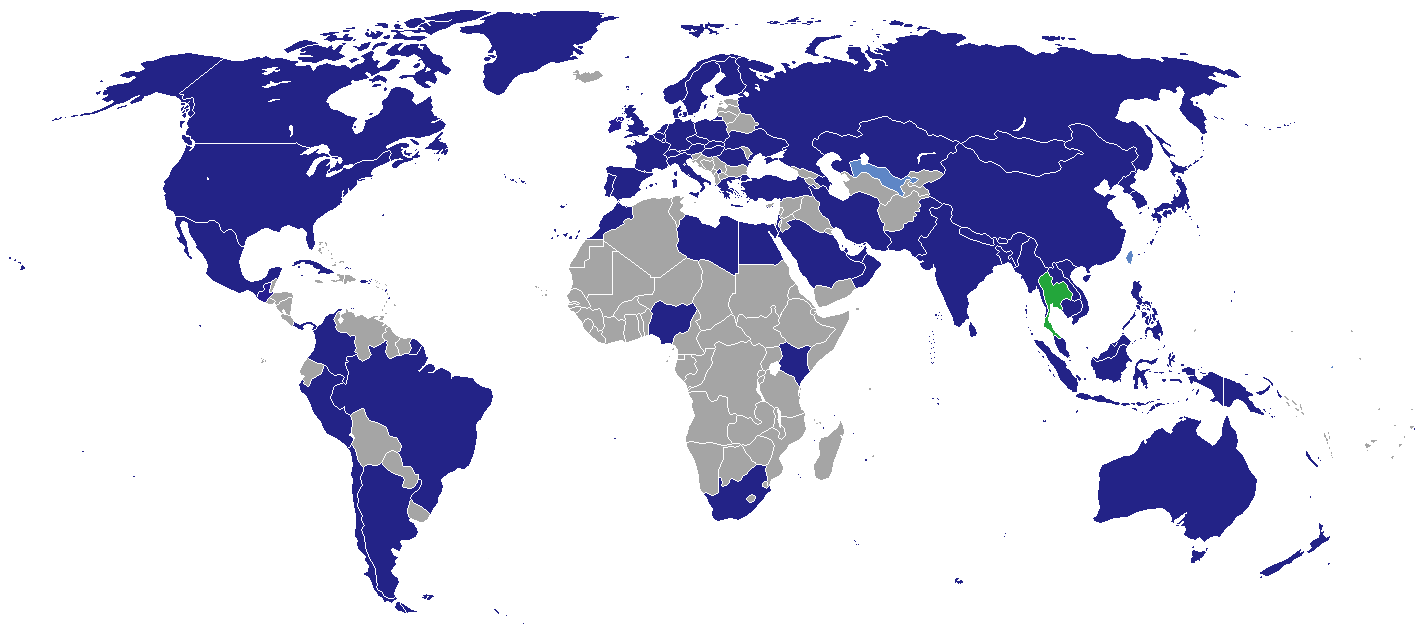
Map of diplomatic missions in Thailand

== Diplomatic missions in Bangkok ==
=== Embassies ===
1. Argentina
2. Australia
3. Austria
4. Azerbaijan
5. Bahrain
6. Bangladesh
7. Belgium
8. Bhutan
9. Brazil
10. Brunei
11. Cambodia
12. Canada
13. Chile
14. China (detail)
15. Colombia
16. Cuba
17. Czechia
18. Denmark
19. Egypt
20. Finland
21. France (detail)
22. Germany (detail)
23. Greece
24. Guatemala
25. Holy See
26. Hungary
27. India
28. Indonesia (detail)
29. Iran
30. Ireland
31. Israel
32. Italy
33. Japan
34. Kazakhstan
35. Kenya
36. Kosovo
37. Kuwait
38. Laos
39. Libya
40. Luxembourg
41. Malaysia
42. Maldives
43. Mexico
44. Mongolia
45. Morocco
46. Myanmar
47. Nepal
48. Netherlands
49. New Zealand
50. Nigeria
51. North Korea
52. Norway
53. Oman
54. Pakistan
55. Panama
56. Papua New Guinea
57. Peru
58. Philippines
59. Poland
60. Portugal (detail)
61. Qatar
62. Romania
63. Russia
64. Saudi Arabia
65. Singapore
66. Slovakia
67. South Africa
68. South Korea (detail)
69. Sovereign Military Order of Malta
70. Spain
71. Sri Lanka
72. Sweden (detail)
73. Switzerland
74. Timor-Leste
75. Turkey
76. Ukraine
77. United Arab Emirates
78. United Kingdom (detail)
79. United States (detail)
80. Vietnam

=== Other missions and delegations ===
1. European Union (Delegation)
2. Hong Kong (Economic & Trade Office)
3. Taiwan (Economic & Cultural Office)
4. United Nations (Resident Coordinator's Office)

== Consular missions ==
The following cities are host to a number of career consular missions; all are consulates-general unless otherwise indicated.

=== Bangkok ===
1. Uzbekistan

=== Chiang Mai ===
1. China (detail)
2. India (Consulate)
3. Japan
4. Myanmar
5. United States (detail)

=== Khon Kaen ===
1. China
2. Laos
3. Vietnam

=== Phuket ===
1. Australia
2. China (Consular Office)
3. Kazakhstan (Consulate)
4. Russia

=== Sa Kaeo ===
1. Cambodia

=== Songkhla ===
1. China
2. Indonesia (Consulate)
3. Malaysia

== Non-resident embassies accredited to Thailand ==
Listed by city of residence.

=== Resident in Beijing, China ===
1. Albania
2. Armenia
3. Barbados
4. Benin
5. Bolivia
6. Comoros
7. Congo-Brazzaville
8. Congo-Kinshasa
9. Equatorial Guinea
10. Estonia
11. Guinea-Bissau
12. Guyana
13. Ivory Coast
14. Jamaica
15. Madagascar
16. Malawi
17. Micronesia
18. Niger
19. North Macedonia
20. Sierra Leone
21. Slovenia
22. Somalia

=== Resident in Hanoi, Vietnam ===
1. Angola
2. Belarus
3. Bulgaria
4. Haiti

=== Resident in Jakarta, Indonesia ===
1. Croatia
2. Mauritania
3. Mozambique
4. Serbia
5. Suriname
6. Tunisia

=== Resident in Kuala Lumpur, Malaysia ===
1. Afghanistan
2. Algeria
3. Bosnia and Herzegovina
4. Eswatini
5. Fiji
6. Ghana
7. Guinea
8. Iraq
9. Jordan
10. Kyrgyzstan
11. Lesotho
12. Mauritius
13. Namibia
14. Palestine
15. Senegal
16. Sudan
17. Tajikistan
18. Tanzania
19. Turkmenistan
20. Uganda
21. Uruguay
22. Venezuela
23. Yemen
24. Zambia
25. Zimbabwe

=== Resident in New Delhi, India ===
1. Burkina Faso
2. Burundi
3. Cyprus
4. El Salvador
5. Eritrea
6. Ethiopia
7. Georgia
8. Lebanon
9. Mali
10. Paraguay
11. Seychelles

=== Resident in Tokyo, Japan ===
1. Botswana
2. Djibouti
3. Honduras
4. Iceland
5. Liberia
6. Marshall Islands
7. Nicaragua
8. Rwanda

=== Resident in other cities ===
1. Belize (Belmopan)
2. Dominican Republic (Seoul)
3. Gabon (Seoul)
4. Lithuania (Singapore)
5. Malta (Valletta)
6. Montenegro (Brussels)
7. Saint Kitts and Nevis (London)
8. Samoa (Canberra)
9. San Marino (City of San Marino)
10. Tonga (Canberra)

== Closed missions ==
Host city	Sending country	Mission	Year closed	Ref.
Bangkok	Bulgaria	Embassy	2011	
Bangkok	Iraq	Embassy	2003	
Bangkok	Lebanon	Embassy	1999	
Bangkok	Nauru	Consulate-General	2025	
Bangkok	Sudan	Embassy	2021	
Bangkok	Syria	Embassy		
Pattaya	United Kingdom	Consulate	2012	
Phuket	Sweden	Consulate-General	2008	

== Missions to open ==
Host city	Sending country	Mission	Ref.
Bangkok	Iraq	Embassy	
Songkhla	Cambodia	Consulate-General	

== See also ==
- List of diplomatic missions of Thailand
- Foreign relations of Thailand
- Visa requirements for Thai citizens
