= Peter Sha-li Lan =

Taiwanese diplomat

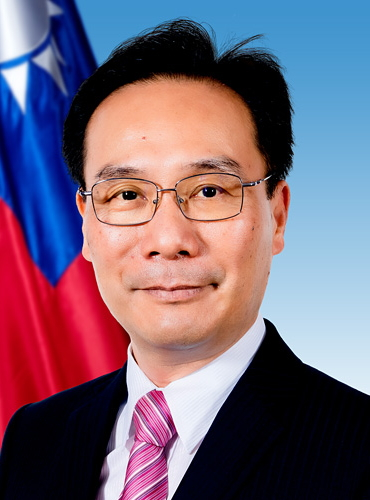

Representative of Taiwan to Thailand
- Incumbent
- Assumed office July 2025
- President: Lai Ching-te
- Preceded by: Chang Chun-fu

Peter Sha-li Lan (Chinese: 藍夏禮) is a Taiwanese diplomat serving as head of the Taipei Economic and Cultural Representative Office in Bangkok since 2025. Lan previously served as head of the Department of East Asian and Pacific Affairs at the Ministry of Foreign Affairs in 2023, and as ambassador to Saint Vincent and the Grenadines from 2021 to 2023.

== Career ==
Lan oversaw the opening of Taiwan-Thailand International Talent Circulation Base office in Bangkok in 2025.

Following alleged attempts by the Chinese Embassy in Bangkok to censor elements of the Taiwan Documentary and Film Festival in Thailand in July 2026, Lan said cultural exchanges between Taiwan and Thailand would continue.
