= Zhang Xinyan (activist) =

Hong Kong pro-democracy activist

Zhang Xinyan (Chinese: 張信燕; Thai: จาง ซิ่น เอียน) is a Hong Kong pro-democracy activist and member of the organization Hong Kong Parliament. Based in Canada since 2026, Zhang is among 19 individuals wanted by the National Security Department for alleged subversion, with a HK$200,000 bounty placed on her in July 2025.

== Career ==
In 2014, Zhang moved to Thailand, claiming persecution as a member of the Falun Gong movement. Her Chinese passport was confiscated and revoked by the Chinese Embassy in Bangkok, and she subsequently obtained refugee status recognition by the UNHCR in 2016.

=== 2026 arrest and detention Thailand ===
On 9 May 2026, Zhang was arrested in Thailand on charges of overstaying her visa and working without a permit.

On 8 July 2026, Zhang was detained by Thai immigration authorities just hours prior to her flight to Canada from Thailand under a refugee resettlement arrangement, and imprisoned at Suan Phlu Immigration Centre. Zhang's lawyers were unable to contact her after her arrest.

On 12 July 2026, People's Party Member of Parliament Sorasak Samonkraisorakit called on the Thai government to release Zhang and allow her to travel to Canada to seek asylum.

On 13 July 2026, Zhang appeared on a Human Rights Watch list of Chinese dissidents in Thailand at risk of being deported back to Thailand, along with Bai Zhaodong, Tan Yixiang, and Zhou Junyi. Human Rights Watch’s senior Thailand advisor Sunai Phasuk described Zhang's arrest as "ongoing transnational repression" to the Hong Kong Free Press.

=== Arrival in Canada ===
In August 2026, the Bangkok Post reported Zhang had arrived in Canada. Toronto-based Chinese activist Sheng Xue published a photo with Zhang at Vancouver International Airport with supporters.

== See also ==
- Transnational repression by China
