= Pravit Rojanaphruk =

Thai journalist

- ประวิตร โรจนพฤกษ์
- Education: University of the Philippines; University of Oxford
- Occupation: Journalist
- Organization: Khaosod English

Pravit Rojanaphruk (Thai: ประวิตร โรจนพฤกษ์; RTGS: Prawit Rochanaphruek) (born 1967) is a Thai journalist who works as a senior staff writer for Khaosod English ('fresh news'). He formerly wrote a regular column for The Nation, an English-language newspaper in Thailand, but was pressured to resign due to his political opinions following the 2014 coup d'état. Before the military coup, he was a prominent champion of democracy and free expression and was consequently investigated several times. Immediately after the coup, he was arrested on a charge of lèse majesté and detained for a week. Since the coup, he has been critical of the ruling junta and its efforts to limit freedom. Pravit has been detained for "attitude adjustment" twice by the ruling junta and as of 2017, has sedition charges against him for Facebook posts he made earlier that year.

Andrew MacGregor Marshall, a former Reuters correspondent, described Pravit in the British newspaper The Independent as "one of the country's best correspondents". In recognition of his critical reporting, Rojanaphruk was awarded the prestigious International Press Freedom Award by the Committee to Protect Journalists in 2017.

== Early life and education ==
Pravit was born into a Thai-Chinese family in Bangkok in 1967. The son of a diplomat, he spent several years of his childhood in Brussels and Manila. He received a bachelor's degree in community development from the University of the Philippines and a master's degree in social anthropology from University of Oxford. His master's thesis was entitled, Tourist and Cultural Authenticity: Anthropological Reflection on the Notion of Cultural Authenticity in Tourism.

== Career ==
After working briefly in business, he began writing for The Nation in 1991. As of 1996, he was working as assistant feature editor of The Nation.

After the 22 May 2014 military coup, Pravit and a fellow journalist, Thanapol Eawsakul, were summoned by the military on 23 May 2014. Before answering the summons, Pravit told the Thai media, "I hope people will not give up the spirit and that General Prayut will be the last dictator of Thailand". He was said to have added: "They can detain me, but can never detain my conscience". He thereupon taped his mouth shut and put his hands over his ears. On the following day he went with a lawyer and representatives of the UN to the headquarters of the National Council for Peace and Order (NCPO). He was questioned for five hours without his lawyer being present and was then taken to an unidentified detention center.

The Foreign Correspondents' Club (FCCT) of Thailand issued a statement expressing its deep concern about the detention of Pravit and Eawsakul, noting that freedom of expression and the right for journalists to work without fear of arrest or harm are core principles of the FCCT. The FCCT urged the new military government to end the detainment of journalists and lift restrictions on the media.

Pravit later explained that he had been detained for a week at a military camp outside Bangkok. He reportedly told the commander that he did not bear any resentment towards him or his men, but on the contrary, explained he was an ardent supporter of democracy and freedom. Upon his release, he later explained, Pravit was forced to sign a conditional agreement in which he promised he would not aid, join, lead, or have any involvement with any anti-junta movement.

Pravit has been outspoken against Chinese government interference in domestic Thai affairs. In August 2026, he published an opinion piece in Nikkei Asia titled "Chinese diplomats must stop telling Thais what to think and do", criticizing China's ambassador to Thailand Zhang Jianwei's encouragement against using the phrase "gray Chinese" to describe Chinese immigrants in Thailand conducting illicit activity. Pravit also highlighted incidences of Chinese censorship in Thailand, including the 2025 Bangkok Art and Culture Centre censorship incident and attempts by the Chinese Embassy in Bangkok to have the 2026 Taiwan Documentary and Film Festival in Thailand remove the logo of the Taiwanese Ministry of Culture from its promotional material.

== 2015 detention ==
Pravit was "detained" by the military for the second time from 13 to 15 September 2015. Pravit's first military detention was in May 2014, two days after the coup d'état, when the junta's National Council for Peace and Order (NCPO) detained him at an army base in Ratchaburi Province for a week. In the second interrogation, after about an hour of questioning, Pravit was taken to an army base where he was asked about his political stance, his affiliations with political groups, and human rights organizations, and his reasons for disagreeing with Article 112, the lèse majesté law. During his interrogation, Pravit found that the military officials were concerned with social media. "They were paranoid about tweets, not even published news in The Nation". After being interrogated at the army base from 15:30-21:00, Pravit was transported in a van for a little over an hour to another location. During the ride, Pravit was blindfolded, so he did not know where he was taken. "Although I wasn't tortured,...I was severely intimidated and infringed upon", said Pravit.

== Resignation from The Nation ==
On 15 September 2015, Pravit resigned from The Nation under pressure from the newspaper due to his political opinions. He said he agreed to quit because he "considered the newspaper to be like his own home, which he didn't wish to destroy". Pravit had been detained on 13 September by soldiers and held incommunicado until 15 September for what the military called "attitude adjustment". He had been an outspoken critic, in newspaper columns and on Twitter, of the junta that has ruled since a military coup ousted a civilian government. It was the second time Pravit was detained by the junta, which summoned large numbers of politicians and potential dissidents in the months after the coup, and resumed a crackdown on dissent. The junta says criticism could destabilize the nation, which it says needs unity after almost a decade of sometimes violent political conflict.

== 2017 sedition charges ==
On 8 August 2017, the Police Technology Crime Suppression Division charged Pravit with sedition and computer crimes for posting comments on his Facebook page criticizing military rule and the National Council for Peace and Order (NCPO) junta's slow response to flooding in northeastern provinces. Sedition in Thailand carries up to a seven year sentence. Thailand's "Computer-Related Crime Act" enables authorities to restrict online speech, spy on users, and censor. The government regards internet criticism of the NCPO as "distorted" and "false", an offense under article 14 of the law. According to the Committee to Protect Journalists (CPJ) the charges carry a sentence of seven to twenty years in prison. The CPJ sent a follow-up letter to the prime minister in September 2019 asking him to fully restore press freedoms and, in particular, to drop sedition charges against Pravit. This happened after the junta was replaced by an elected government.

== Book ==
His 1996 book Wishes and Lies is a collection of articles from The Nation, originally published between 1992 and 1995.

== Honours and awards ==
- Pravit was awarded the 2017 International Press Freedom Award by the Committee to Protect Journalists (CPJ).
- In 1994, Pravit was named "outstanding journalist" by the Sathirakoses-Nagapradipa Foundation.
- In 1995, he became the first Thai to win a grant from the International Center for Human Rights and Democratic Development, which is given to journalists from developing countries.
- Pravit attended the University of Oxford both as a Reuters Institute Fellow and as a Chevening scholar.
- In 2009, Pravit was a recipient of a Katherine Fanning Fellowship for Journalism and Democracy from the Kettering Foundation.
