= Tan Yixiang =

- Born: 1976 or 1977 (age 49–50)

Tan Yixiang (Chinese: 谭翼翔) is a Chinese activist based in Thailand.

== Career ==
Tan is an advocate for Tibetan and Uighur rights.

Tan left China in 2016. While in Cambodia, he lost his passport; upon applying for a new passport at the Chinese embassy, he was told his household registration had been cancelled. While Tan was out of the country, his estranged wife had obtained a death certificate in his name. He is currently a UN-recognized refugee.

=== Detention in Thailand and deportation to China ===
Tan arrived in Thailand in 2022 and was arrested on 5 December. He was released on bail in 2023, but continued to be harassed by Thai authorities for his social media presence. He was re-arrested in February 2024.

Tan was held in an immigration detention center in Thailand, and was seeking asylum from third countries.

On 13 July 2026, Tan appeared on a Human Rights Watch (HRW) list of Chinese dissidents in Thailand at risk of being deported back to China, along with Zhang Xinyan, Bai Zhaodong, and Zhou Junyi. HRW noted the Chinese government had increased pressure on Thailand to deport these activists ahead of Thai Prime Minister Anutin Charnvirakul's visit to China from 16 July 2026 to 20 July 2026.

A Canadian human rights activist, Sheng Xue, later told media that Tan had been repatriated without his lawyer or the UNHCR being informed. Sunai Phasuk, a senior Thailand advisor at HRW, subsequently confirmed to Thai Enquirer that Tan had been deported to China.

== Personal life ==
Tan is Catholic.
