= Germany–Thailand relations =

Bilateral relations

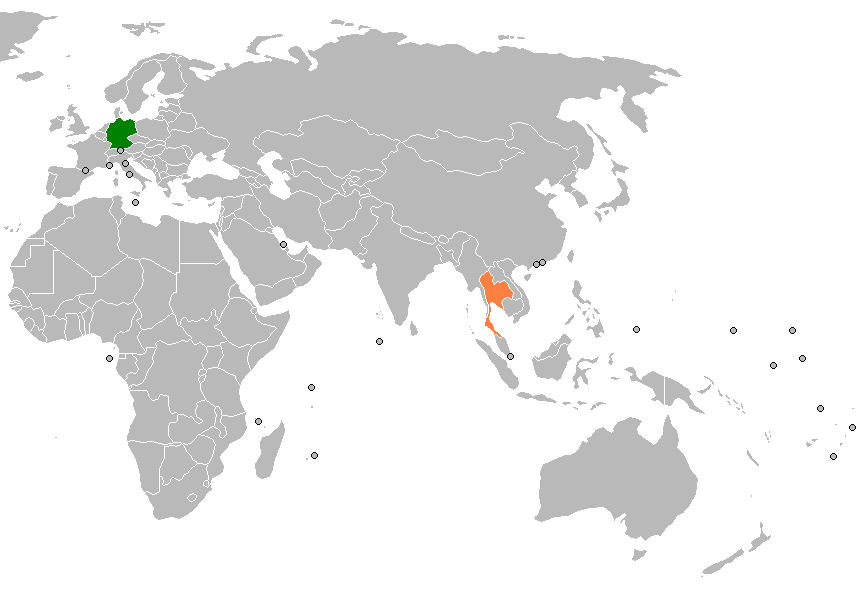

- Germany: Thailand

Diplomatic mission
- Embassy of Germany, Bangkok: Royal Thai Embassy, Berlin

Germany and Thailand share bilateral relations officially dating to 1858. Thailand has an embassy in Berlin, consulate generals in Frankfurt and Munich and Germany has an embassy in Bangkok.

== History ==
=== Origins ===
Early on, Germans were active in Siam and reported on the country and its conditions, for example in the 17th century Engelbert Kaempfer and Johann Jakob Merklein. And already in 1678 a certain Johann Janßen Strauß wrote about "Ayudhya" and portrayed the king as one of the richest men in the world. The young Prince Frederick William IV had read about Siam and jokingly called the Charlottenhof Palace, which he helped design, "Siam."

=== Start of formal relations ===
In 1858, Siam signed a trade treaty with the Hanseatic cities of Hamburg, Lübeck and Bremen through the Hanseatic cities' representative in Singapore. At the same time, a German consul in Bangkok received his authorization from King Mongkut (Rama IV): the German merchant Theodor Thies from Bangkok. However, the first ambassador of a German state, Friedrich zu Eulenburg for the Kingdom of Prussia, arrived in Bangkok only in 1861 and concluded a treaty of friendship with Siam in 1862. No suitable candidate could be found from the Thai side for an ambassadorial post in Germany, so King Mongkut asked John Bowring to serve as Siamese ambassador. The first Siamese diplomat to be sent to Germany was Prince Prisdang Choomsai (1881).

Towards the end of the 19th century, German companies exerted a great influence on Siam's economic life and conquered important areas of the country's infrastructure development: Construction of the telegraph network, development of ports and the country's railroads and railroads. The first trip of a Siamese head led King Chulalongkorn Rama V in 1897 to Europe and also to Germany. After the First World War, however, all German possessions were confiscated under King Vajiravudh (Rama VI).

In 2012, Germany and Thailand celebrated the 150th anniversary of the establishment of diplomatic relations. This anniversary year was used to intensify the exchange of political visitors.

== Economic relations ==
Thailand and Germany are close economic partners. In 2021, German companies exported goods worth 4.9 billion Euro to Thailand. In turn, German imports from Germany stood at 6.9 billion Euro. More than 600 German companies are active in Thailand, who employ more than 200,000 people in Thailand. Before the COVID-19 pandemic around 900,000 German tourists visited Thailand yearly.

The German-Thai Chamber of Commerce promotes bilateral economic relations. The bilateral aviation agreement in place since 1965 is currently being harmonized in accordance with European law. An agreement on investment promotion and protection treaty entered into force in October 2004.

== Cultural relations ==
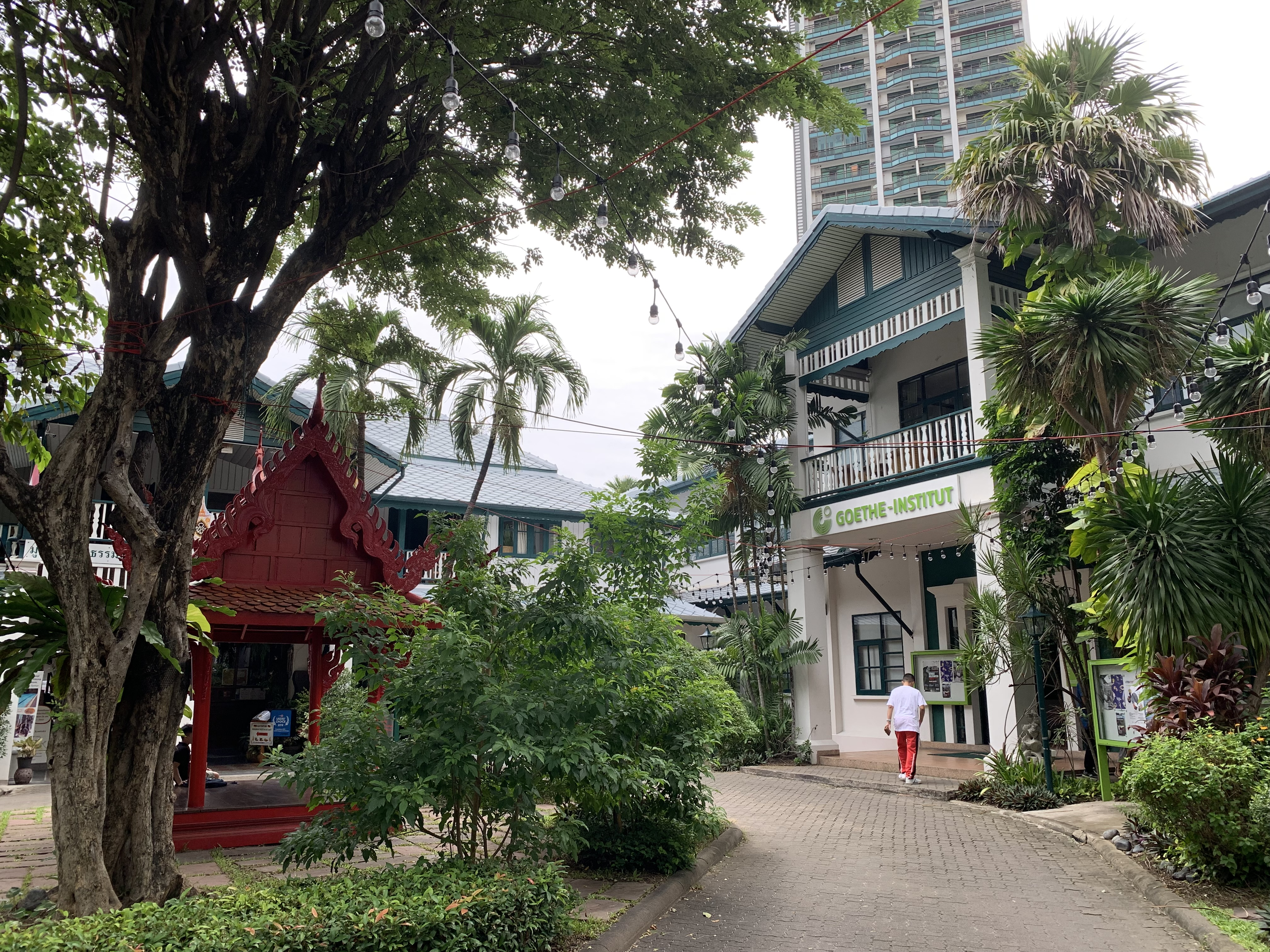
Goethe-Institut, Bangkok

The close relations in the cultural field date back to the agreement of 1984. The Goethe-Institut in Bangkok is an important institution for cultural exchange, especially for the promotion of the German language. Many partnerships between German and Thai universities have developed over time. The German Academic Exchange Service (DAAD) has a student advisory center in Bangkok and offers a large number of scholarships for Thai students to attend international programs leading to bachelor's and master's degrees.

== Resident diplomatic missions ==
- Germany has an embassy in Bangkok.
- Thailand has an embassy in Berlin and a consulates-general in Frankfurt and Munich.

== Literature ==
- Rudolf Baierl: "140 Years Peace : fundamental conditions for the commencement of German-Thai amity". 5th Asia Pacific Forum 2003. Als pdf unter http://public.beuth-hochschule.de/~baierl/Thai/A4Thai_Deut_Peace.pdf (letzter Zugriff am 10. November 2010).
- Manich Jumsai: History of the Thai-German relations (from the files of the Thai Embassy in Bonn and the German Ministry of Foreign Affairs). Bangkok: Chalermnit 1978.
- Catthiyakorn Sasitharamas: Die deutsch-thailändischen Beziehungen in der Zeit der Weimarer Republik bis zum Ende des Zweiten Weltkriegs. Hamburg: Kovac 2012, ISBN 978-3-8300-6361-2.
- Stefanie Rathje (2004), Unternehmenskultur als Interkultur: Entwicklung und Gestaltung interkultureller Unternehmenskultur am Beispiel deutscher Unternehmen in Thailand (in German), Sternenfels: Wissenschaft und Praxis, ISBN 978-3-89673-207-1
- Andreas Stoffers (1995), Im Lande des weißen Elefanten: die Beziehungen zwischen Deutschland und Thailand von den Anfängen bis 1962 (in German), Bonn: Deutsch-Thailändische Gesellschaft, ISBN 3-923387-21-0
- Andreas Stoffers (2012), Sawasdee-150 Jahre Deutsch-Thailändische Freundschaft (in German), Rosenheim: Rosenheimer Verlagshaus, ISBN 978-3-475-54134-6
- Andreas Stoffers (2014), Thailand und Deutschland: Wirtschaft, Politik, Kultur (in German), Wiesbaden: Springer Gable, ISBN 978-3-642-54984-7
- Volker Grabowsky (Hrsg.): Thailand und Deutschland. 150 Jahre Diplomatie und Völkerfreundschaft. Zenos Verlag, Segnitz 2014, ISBN 978-3-931018-40-5.
- Pornsarn Watanangura: Literatur und Sprache: Studien zum deutsch-thailändischen Kulturkontakt. Aragon Verlag, Moers 2015, ISBN 978-3-89535-518-9.
