= Taiwan Documentary and Film Festival in Thailand =

Taiwan Documentary and Film Festival in Thailand เทศกาลสารคดีและภาพยนตร์ไต้หวันแห่งประเทศไทย
- Locations: Bangkok and Khon Kaen, Thailand
- Most recent: 22 - 26 July 2026

The Taiwan Documentary and Film Festival in Thailand (Thai: เทศกาลสารคดีและภาพยนตร์ไต้หวันแห่งประเทศไทย) is an annual film festival held in Thailand.

The festival is organized by the Taiwanese Ministry of Culture, the Taipei Economic and Cultural Office in Thailand, Taiwan Film and Audiovisual Institute, Taiwan Docs, and New Taipei City Government, in cooperation with Thailand's Documentary Club and Movies Matter.

== History ==
=== 2022 ===
The fifth Taiwan Documentary and Film Festival in Thailand was held from 4 to 6 November 2022.

=== 2026 ===
The eighth Taiwan Documentary and Film Festival in Thailand is being held from 22 to 26 July 2026. The 2026 festival features 17 films and documentaries being shown at House Samyan and Century Sukhumvit in Bangkok, and Pratudang Space in Khon Kaen.

==== Attempted censorship by Chinese Embassy ====
In July 2026, Khaosod reported that staff from the Chinese Embassy in Bangkok attempted to pressure festival organizers from removing the logo of the Taiwanese Ministry of Culture from its promotional material. The Embassy also expressed opposition to screening films that were not aligned with the One China policy. Thida Plitpholkarnpim, head of the Documentary Club which co-organized the festival, said that Embassy staffers both called and visited the gallery to demand the removal of the logo.

The organizers did not remove the logo, and the festival proceeded as scheduled. The opening film was "Eat Drink Man Woman," directed by Ang Lee.

On 23 July 2206, Taiwan's Minister of Culture Li Yuan thanked Thai organizers for refusing to remove the logo, saying that, "China is very afraid of Taiwan’s cultural strength."

On 25 July 2026, Member of Parliament and former diplomat Sorasak Samonkraisorakit wrote on social media that China's actions violated diplomatic protocol by failing to go through the Thai Foreign Ministry.
