= Embassy of South Korea, Bangkok =

Embassy of South Korea, Bangkok 주 태국 대한민국 대사관 สถานเอกอัครราชทูตสาธารณรัฐเกาหลีประจำประเทศไทย

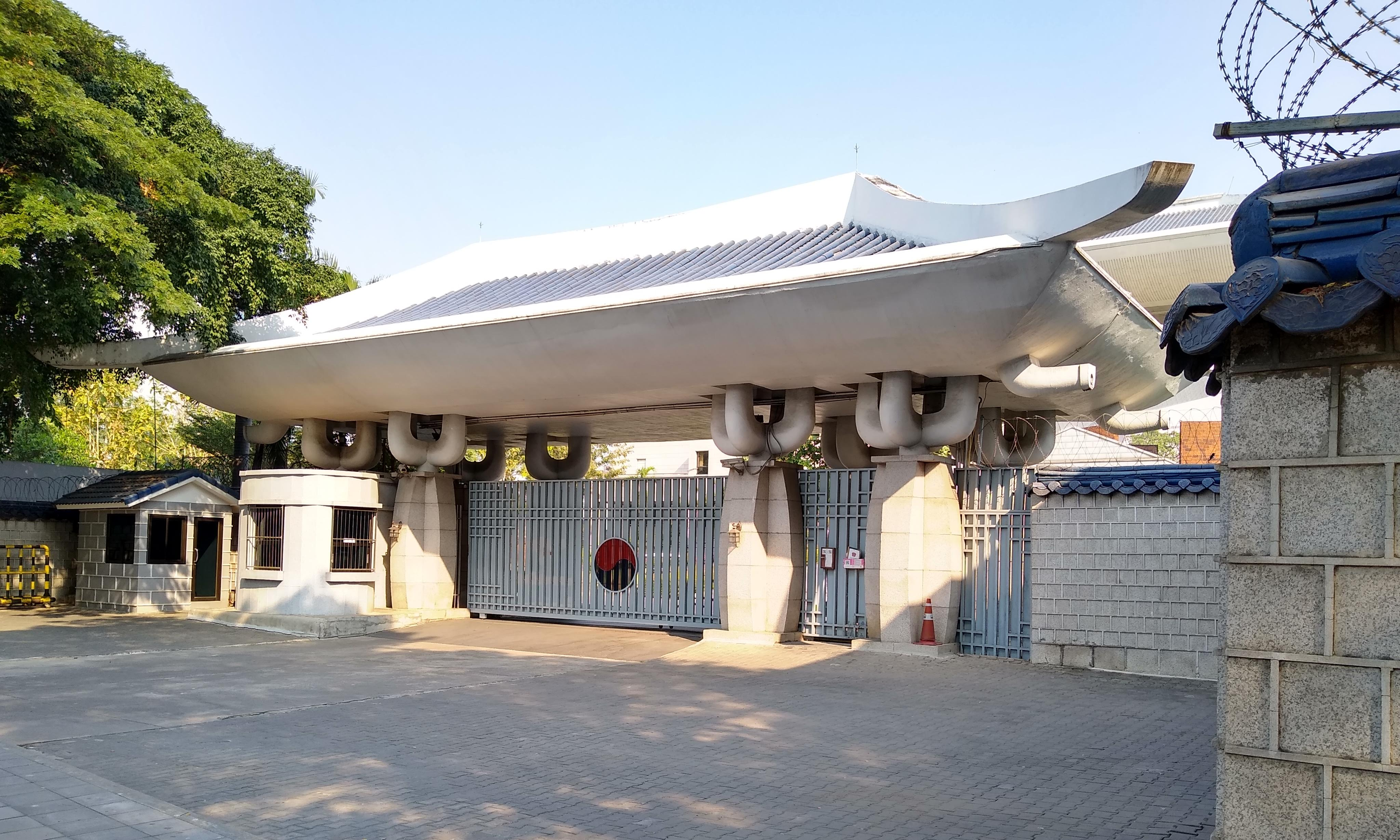
- Location: Huai Khwang district, Bangkok, Thailand
- Address: No. 23 Thiam Ruam Mit Road, Ratchadapisek, Huai Khwang district, Bangkok, Thailand
- Coordinates: 13.767472°N 100.577944°E
- Ambassador: Lee Wook-heon
- Jurisdiction: Thailand
- Website: http://tha.mofa.go.kr

- Embassy of South Korea, Bangkok
- Hangul: 주 태국 대한민국 대사관
- Hanja: 駐泰國大韓民國大使館
- Revised Romanization: Ju Taeguk Daehanminguk daesagwan
- McCune–Reischauer: Chu T'aeguk Taehanmin'guk taesagwan

Embassy of South Korea, Bangkok (Korean: 주 태국 대한민국 대사관; Thai: สถานเอกอัครราชทูตสาธารณรัฐเกาหลีประจำประเทศไทย), a diplomatic mission of the Republic of Korea to the Kingdom of Thailand, is located at No.23 Thiam Ruam Mit Road, Ratchadapisek, Huai Khwang district, Bangkok. The mission was opened as a Legation following the establishment of diplomatic relations between South Korea and Thailand in 1958. After promoted to the status of Embassy in 1960, it changed its location a few times and moved into the current address in 1990. The Korean Embassy, led by an Ambassador extraordinary and plenipotentiary, is divided into several sections tasked with different affairs like politic, economic, culture and defence diplomacy.

== History ==
The formal Korean-Thai relations was established on 1 October 1958, and the two countries issued a joint statement to exchange diplomatic missions on the same day. It was announced on 20 January 1959 that Choe Deok-sin, then Ambassador to Saigon, South Vietnam, would concurrently accredited to Thailand as an Envoy in order to head the new Korean Legation in Bangkok, which was promoted to full status of Embassy on 30 August 1960, with Yu Jae-hung being South Korea's first Ambassador stationed in Thailand. The Embassy was located on 349, Silon Road right after its opening, later it operated on several locations including No. 181, South Sathorn Road and 6th floor, Prapawit Building, No. 28/1 Surasak Road. In 1990, the Embassy finally moved into the new compound on Thiam Ruam Mit Road, within which the structures were built with Korean-style, and the main building was designed by architect Kim Joong-up.

== Offices & Sections ==
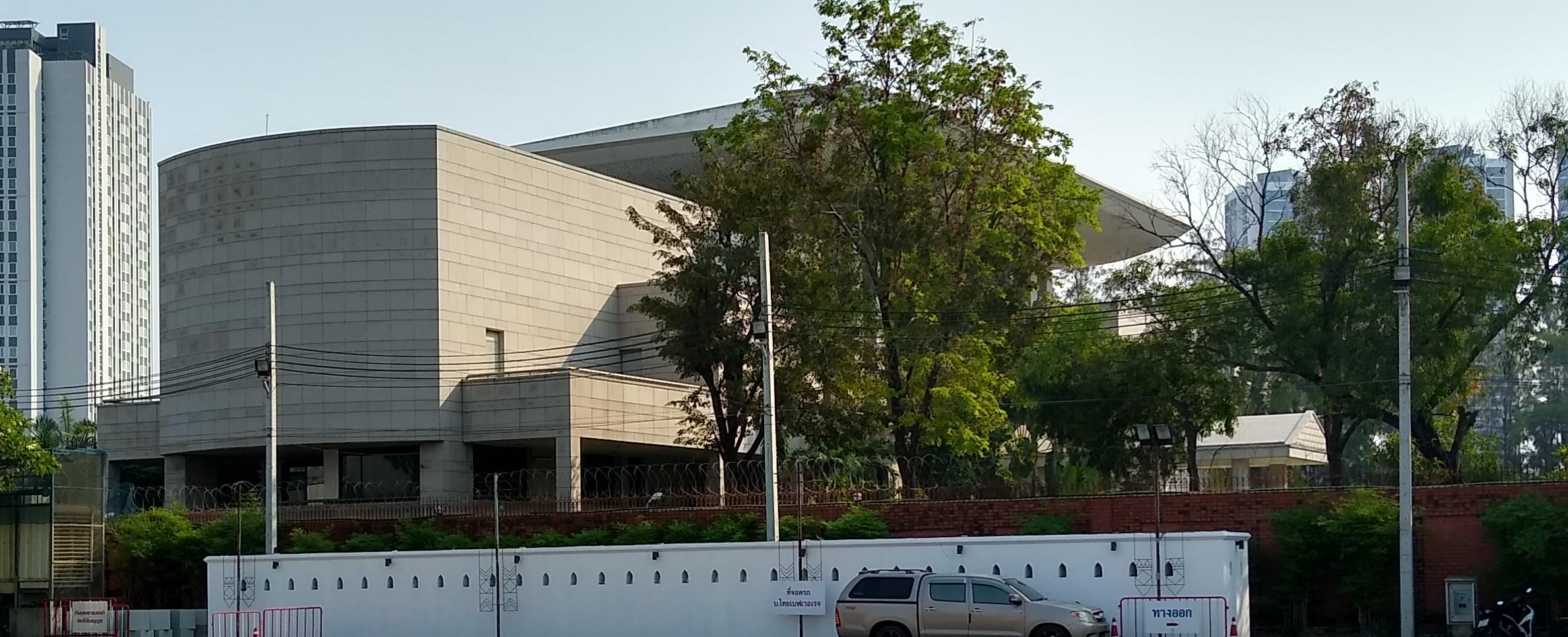
Embassy of South Korea in Bangkok

The South Korean Embassy in Bangkok has subordinate units including the Political Section (정무과), Economic Section (경제과), Consular Section (영사과), Culture and Public Information Section (문화홍보과), General Affairs Section (총무과) and a Defense Attaché Office (무관부). The Political and Economic Sections are responsible to conduct political/economic-related diplomatic negotiations and cooperation with the Thai government, investigating/reporting situations about Thai politics/economy and foreign policies. They also work together with political/economic-related international organizations or investigate/report activities concerning these kinds of organization.

The responsibility of the Consular Section includes the protection for South Koreans abroad, and deals with passport, conscription, consular confirmation, civil affairs and visa services. The Culture and Public Information Section carries out introductions for Korean culture in Thailand, promotion of national image, and the interchange of public opinion between the two countries. The General Affairs Section, acting as the managing department for the Embassy's operation, is in charge of administrative affairs including personnel, budget, paperwork, security and compound managements. Defense Attaché Office enhances the Korean-Thai defence diplomacy, military exchange and cooperation.

== Heads of mission ==
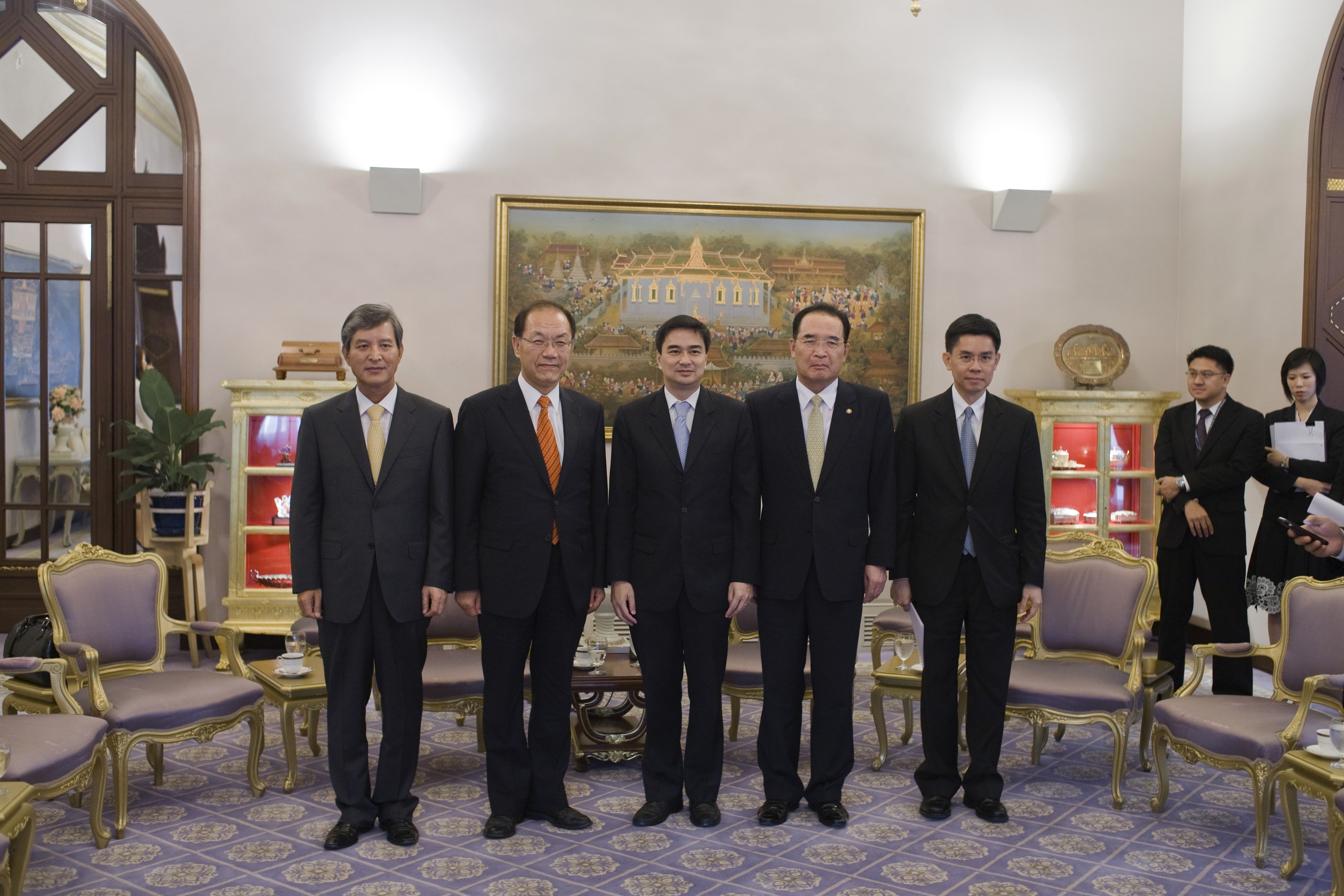
Ambassador Chung Hae-moon, left, met with Thai Prime Minister Abhisit Vejjajiva and other political figures from Korea and Thailand at the Government House of Thailand on 19 July 2010.

Heads of the South Korean mission to Thailand
Names	Names in Hangul/Hanja	Tenure started	Ref
Envoys
Choe Deok-sin	최덕신(崔德新)	20 January 1959	concurrently served as Ambassador to South Vietnam
Ambassadors
Yu Jae-hung	유재흥(劉載興)	30 August 1960	Embassy opened on the same day
Lee Dong-won	이동원(李東元)	26 December 1963	
Chang Sung-hwan	장성환(張盛煥)	21 October 1964	
Han Pyo-wook	한표욱(韓豹頊)	18 March 1968	
Lim Yun-yong	임윤영(林胤英)	10 March 1971	
Cheon Byung-kyu	천병규(千炳圭)	27 April 1974	
Park Geun	박근(朴槿)	2 August 1976	
Kim In-kwon	김인권(金寅權)	20 September 1979	
Kwon Tae-ung	권태웅(權泰雄)	9 February 1981	
Kim Chwa-su	김좌수(金左洙)	8 January 1985	
Chung Choo-nyun	정주년(鄭炷年)	28 February 1989	
Han Tak-chae	한탁채(韓鐸埰)	1 September 1992	
Chung Tae-dong	정태동(鄭泰東)	14 March 1994	
Kim Nai-sung	김내성(金乃誠)	16 March 1997	
Kim Kook-chin	김국진(金國振)	12 March 1999	
Choi Hyuk	최혁(崔革)	5 March 2002	
Yoon Jee-jun	윤지준(尹志峻)	17 January 2004	
Han Tae-kyu	한태규(韓泰奎)	30 March 2006	
Chung Hae-moon	정해문(鄭海文)	8 October 2008	
Lim Jae-hong	임재홍(林栽弘)	30 September 2011	
Jeon Jae-man	전재만(全在萬)	8 October 2012	
Noh Kwang-il	노광일(魯光鎰)	5 November 2015	
Lee Wook-heon	이욱현(李郁憲)	22 November 2018	

== See also ==
- South Korea–Thailand relations
- List of diplomatic missions of South Korea
- List of diplomatic missions in Thailand
