= Bai Zhaodong =

Chinese journalist

Bai Zhaodong (Chinese: 白兆东) is a Chinese journalist based in Thailand.

== Career ==
Bai worked as an investigative journalist in China for 25 years, most recently at Beijing Caijing Magazine and Caixin. Bai focused on reporting on high-level corruption along with the impacts of Xi Jinping's poverty alleviation policies.

=== 2026 detention in Thailand ===
Bai was detained by Thai immigration authorities in January 2026. The Chinese Foreign Ministry subsequently submitted an extradition request to Thailand for Bai.

On 13 July 2026, Bai appeared on a Human Rights Watch (HRW) list of Chinese dissidents in Thailand at risk of being deported back to Thailand, along with Zhang Xinyan, Tan Yixiang, and Zhou Junyi.

On 15 July 2026, Reporters Without Borders (RSF) and Safeguard Defenders issued a statement calling on Thailand to half Bai's extradition, writing, "Following the forceful return of 40 Uyghurs to China last year, the international community must be clear that at stake is not only Bai and others' wellbeing, but Thailand's international image itself."

On 17 July 2026, the Foreign Correspondents' Club of Thailand (FCCT) issued a statement asking the Thai authorities to "disclose the conditions in which Bai Zhaodong is being kept, and not to extradite him to China while there are legitimate concerns over how he will be treated."

On 20 July 2026, the International Federation for Human Rights (FIDH) and the World Organisation Against Torture (OMCT) issued a joint statement against Bai's possible deportation to China.

On 5 August 2026, The Wall Street Journal's editorial board published an opinion criticizing China's detention of Bai, writing that the "Trump Administration can help by raising Mr. Bai’s case with Thailand."

On October 8, 2026, Thailand began extradition proceedings for Bai.

== See also ==
- Transnational repression by China
