= Chang Sung-hwan =

South Korean general and politician (1920–2015)

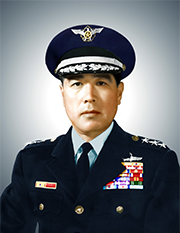
Chang in 1962.

Chang Sung-hwan (Korean: 장성환; Hanja: 張盛煥; October 27, 1920 – January 4, 2015) was a South Korean air force lieutenant general, government minister and diplomat.

== Military career ==
He was the first Korean pilot to fly the North American P-51 Mustang during the Korean War. He was Chief of Staff of the Republic of Korea Air Force from 1962 to 1964.

== Other career ==
Upon his retirement from the military, he served as ambassador to Thailand, transportation minister, and president of the Korea Trade Promotion Corporation (KOTRA).

== Death ==
Chang died in January 2015 of natural causes. He was 94.
