= Sorasak Samonkraisorakit =

Thai politician

- สรศักดิ์ สมรไกรสรกิจ

Member of the House of Representatives of Thailand
- Incumbent
- Assumed office 8 February 2026

Sorasak Samonkraisorakit (Thai: สรศักดิ์ สมรไกรสรกิจ) is a Thai politician serving as a Member of the House of Representatives. He is a party-list MP from the People's Party and former Foreign Ministry official.

== Career ==
Sorasak served as First Secretary of the Royal Thai Embassy in Washington, D.C.

=== House of Representatives ===
Sorasak was elected in 2026.

In July 2026, Sorasak called on the Thai government to release Chinese dissident Zhang Xinyan from immigration detention and allow her to travel to seek asylum in Canada.

On 12 July 2026, Sorasak made a Facebook post writing that Thailand must avoid becoming politically subservient to China. Khaosod reported Sorasak wrote, "Appreciating Chinese culture and commerce does not mean Thailand should submit or become a politically subservient state in international affairs."
