= Zhang Jianwei =

Chinese diplomat

- 张建伟

Chinese Ambassador to Thailand
- Incumbent
- Assumed office 29 July 2025
- Preceded by: Han Zhiqiang

Personal details
- Party: Chinese Communist Party

Ambassador Zhang Jianwei at the Thai Parliament

Zhang Jianwei (Chinese: 张建伟) is a Chinese diplomat, serving as Chinese Ambassador to Thailand since 2025. Zhang previously served as Chinese Ambassador to Kuwait.

== Career ==
In May 2026, Zhang wrote an opinion piece in the Bangkok Post titled "China reunification is an inevitable historical trend", where he appealed to Thai society to "Uphold the One-China Principle and Support China's Reunification".

=== "Grey Chinese" comments ===
In June 2026, Zhang asked Thais to refrain from using the term "grey Chinese" (Thai: จีนสีเทา or ทุนจีนสีเทา) during a meeting with Tourism and Sports Minister Surasak Phancharoenworakul. The term has been used to describe Chinese nationals in Thailand who violate Thai laws. Zhang claimed the term stereotypes and labels all Chinese people, as if the whole counter were blamed for the criminal actions.

Zhang's comments came during a widespread crackdown on illegal businesses, including foreign nationals using Thailand's tourism industry to conduct unlawful activities.

In a 25 June 2026 opinion piece in Khaosod titled "How Far Should Thailand Go to Accommodate China?", Pravit Rojanaphruk criticized the ambassador's comments, writing, "If we allow the situation to continue as it is, one day we may have a dictionary listing terms that should not, or cannot, be used in Thailand when discussing China."

On 10 July 2026, Zhang subsequently urged the public to avoid stereotyping all Chinese business activities in Thailand as "grey" at an seminar titled 'China’s Economic Development Plan and New Energy Hopes for Environmental Sustainability'.

=== Thai foreign minister comments ===
In August 2026, Thailand's Minister of Foreign Affairs Sihasak Phuangketkeow urged Zhang to promote mutual understanding, and not just one-sided protection of Chinese interests. In a statement given at Government House on 5 August 2026, Sihasak said, “I have told the ambassador that on sensitive matters he must come out and explain instead of speaking only to protect Chinese interests," adding, "Understanding must be created. While he is here, the ambassador’s main duty is to promote international relations and good understanding among people."

Sihasak's statements came after an incident at Suvarnabhumi Airport on 29 July, where 22 Chinese travelers were barred from boarding a flight after failing to comply with safety regulations.
