= Clara Cheung =

Hong Kong artist and activist

- 張嘉莉
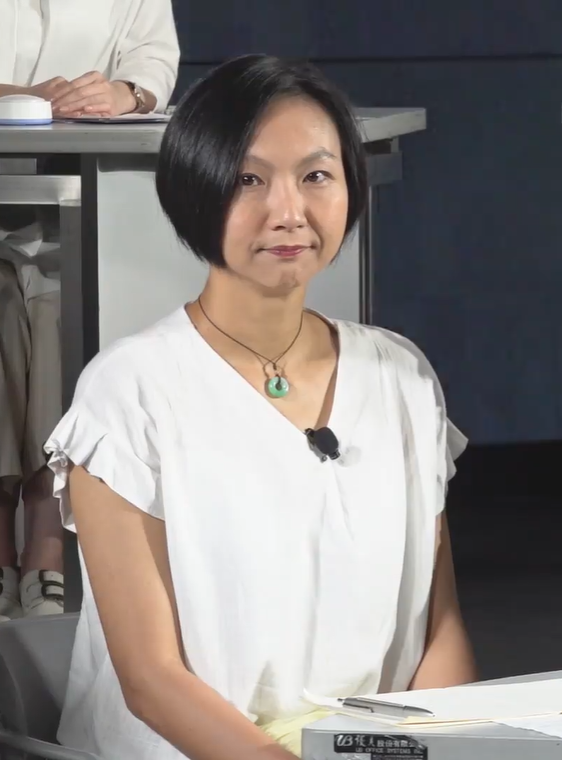

Member of the Wan Chai District Council
- In office 1 January 2020 – 7 July 2021
- Constituency: Happy Valley

Personal details
- Spouse: Gum Cheng Yee Man
- Children: 2

Clara Cheung Ka-lai (Chinese: 張嘉莉) is a Hong Kong artist and activist, co-founder of the C&G Artpartment gallery.

== Career ==
=== C&G Artpartment ===
In 2007, Cheung co-founded C&G Artpartment with her husband, Gum Cheng Yee Man. Located in a tong lau-style apartment building in Mong Kok, the gallery hosted over 80 art exhibitions between 2007 and 2021.

=== Wan Chai District Council ===
In the 2019 Hong Kong local elections, Cheung was elected as a member of the Wan Chai District Council for the Happy Valley Constituency. Cheung was among a number of artists elected to district councils in the election, which were a landslide in favor of Hong Kong's pro-democracy camp.

Cheung from January 2020 until her resignation in July 2021 due to political threats in Hong Kong.

=== Exile ===
Following her resignation, her family went into exile in the United Kingdom, settling in Sheffield.

In 2023, Cheung and Gum launched "Harcourt Road", a community art project comparing the histories of Harcourt Road in Sheffield and Hong Kong.

==== 2025 censorship by China ====
In July 2025, C&G Artpartment's pieces were featured in the "Constellation of Complicity: Visualising the Global Machinery of Authoritarian Solidarity" exhibition at the Bangkok Art and Culture Centre. Following the exhibit's opening, officials from the Chinese Embassy in Bangkok demanded the removal of certain pieces of artwork deemed offensive to China. Cheung and Gum's names were blacked out on the information for the “Anti-Spy Spy Club” installation.
