= Indonesia–Thailand relations =

- Indonesia: Thailand

Diplomatic mission
- Embassy of Indonesia, Bangkok: Royal Thai Embassy, Jakarta

Indonesia and Thailand have officially established diplomatic ties on 7 March 1950. The two countries have since enjoyed a cordial bilateral relationship. Both countries have established embassies in each capitals, Indonesia has their embassy in Bangkok and a consulate in Songkhla, while Thailand has their embassy in Jakarta and honorary consulates in Denpasar, Medan and Surabaya. High rank stately visits has been conducted for years. Both nations are the founders of ASEAN and members of numerous organizations such as the Non-Aligned Movement, APEC, Cairns Group, G20 developing nations and the Indian-Ocean Rim Association. Indonesia is also appointed as observer in the 2008–2013 Cambodian–Thai border crisis.

Following the military takeover of the government in Thailand in May 2014 — without intending to interfere in the internal affairs of Thailand — as part of the ASEAN Community, Indonesia calls for the restoration of democracy in Thailand. Indonesia urged the military and civilian elements in Thailand to work together to quickly restore the political situation in Thailand.

== History ==
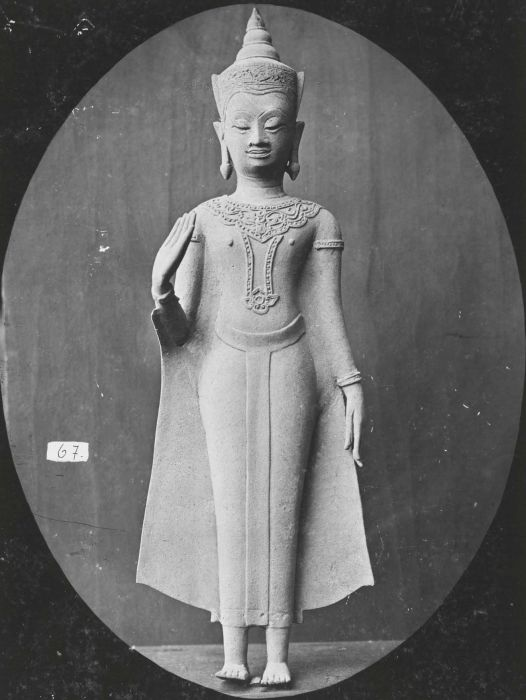
A 16th century Ayutthaya style Buddha bronze statue discovered in Talaga near Kuningan and Cirebon, West Java, suggest trade links between Ayutthaya and Java.

The relations between ancient Thailand and Indonesia dated back to the 8th century during the era of the Srivijaya empire. Parts of Southern Thailand on the Malay Peninsula were under the influence of the thalassocratic Srivijayan empire centered on Sumatra. Srivijayan Buddhist temples could be observed in Chaiya. King Dharanindra (r. 780–800) of Mataram may have brought Shailendras' control on Ligor in the Malay Peninsula. The 14th-century Nagarakretagama Javanese manuscript dated from the Majapahit period has mentioned several states that today are identified to be located in modern Thailand, such as Syangka (Siam), Ayodhyapura (Ayutthaya), Dharmanagari (Nakhon Si Thammarat) in southern Thailand, Rajapura (Ratburi) and Singhanagari (Singhapuri on the branch of the river Menam). The discovery of 16th-century Ayutthayan bronze statuettes at Talaga, a village near Cirebon at the foot of Mount Ciremai, also suggested the ancient relations. Vice versa, the mention of Indonesian places such as Jawaa (Java), Majapahit, Makkasan (Makassar), and Minangkabau can be found in ancient Thai documents.

According to Thai source, during the reign of King Narai in the late 17th century, a few hundred Makassarese fled the city of Makassar and went to Ayutthaya after the Dutch took over their kingdom in the late 1660s. The king gave them a plot of land in the city next to the Malay quarter. The Panji cycle, the tale of love, adventure and bravery of the Javanese prince and his consort, originated from Kadiri and popular in Majapahit era, has made its way to Malay Peninsula, Cambodia, and finally Siam as the tale of Prince Inao (derived from Inu or Hino Kertapati, the other name of the Prince).

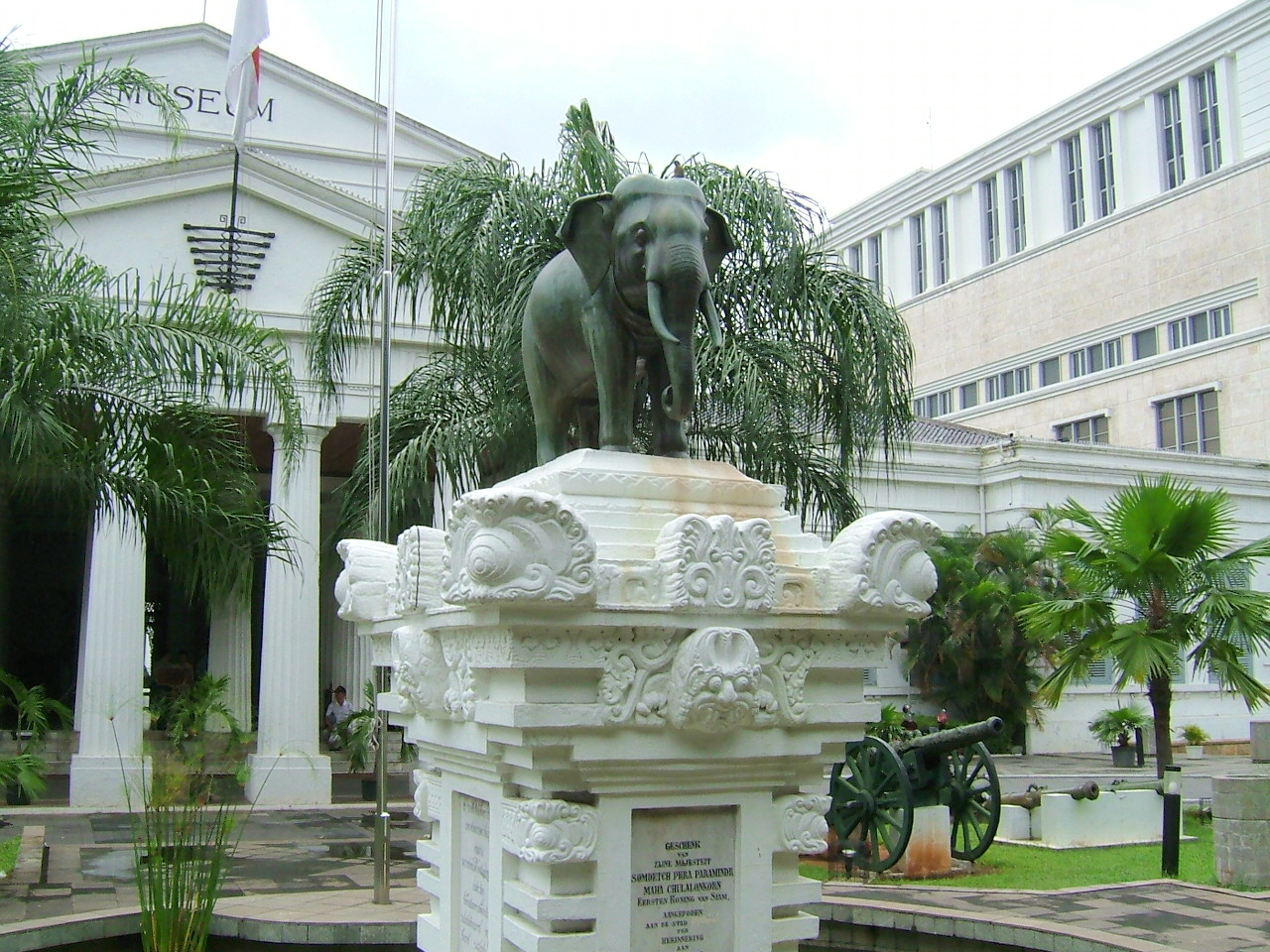
A bronze elephant statue in the front yard of the National Museum.

King Rama V ("King Chulalongkorn") visited Java three times to study Dutch colonial administration and modernization. The King gifted a bronze elephant statue to the city of Batavia (now Jakarta). It still stands in front of the National Museum of Indonesia, which is often called Gedung Gajah (Elephant Building), in response to the King’s interest in Javanese history during his visit. The Dutch established a long-standing colonial presence in the Indonesian archipelago, initially through the Dutch East India Company (VOC) from 1602, with the Dutch government taking direct control in 1800. Their rule focused on a vast network of islands and resources (spices, coffee, sugar). After a joint Franco-Spanish expedition against Vietnam in 1858, French forces captured Saigon in 1859 and broke a subsequent two-year Vietnamese siege in 1861 with reinforcements. The Treaty of Saigon in 1862 ended the war, compelling Emperor Tự Đức to cede three southern provinces to France, creating the French colony of Cochinchina with Saigon as its capital. With the French seeking the protection from Siamese and Vietnamese influence, King Norodom of Cambodia became a French protectorate in 1863. Siam relinquished its suzerainty over Cambodia in the 1867 Franco-Siamese Treaty. France controlled Cochinchina (present day Vietnam) and Cambodia known as French Indochina or the Indochinese Union, established in 1887. The French expansion continued, and following the 1893 Franco-Siamese crisis and the Paknam naval incident, Siam was pressured to sign the Treaty of 3 October 1893. This treaty forced Siam to cede all territories east of the Mekong River, which became the French protectorate of Laos that became part of Indochina. Saigon was the first capital of the Indochinese Union since the establishment in 1887 before it moved to Hanoi in 1902. France designated Indochina as a Colonie d'Exploitation ("Colony of Economic Exploitation"), extracting resources such as rice, coal, and rubber through forced labor and state monopolies on goods like salt and alcohol. While the French introduced some modern infrastructure and a Western education system, these primarily served colonial interests, leading to widespread poverty among the local population and the development of a small, wealthy local class. The French model in Vietnam and the Dutch model in Indonesia shared a common goal of economic exploitation but differed slightly in administrative approach as both systems were characterized by resource extraction, high taxation, and a lack of political freedom for the native populations, profoundly influencing the nature of future national resistance movements between Vietnam and Indonesia. Both colonial powers from Paris and Amsterdam tried to reassert control after World War II, but nationalist movements pushed for full independence movement to declare sovereignty between 17 August and 2 September 1945 which moved quickly that enabled both the Indonesian War of Independence and the August Revolution which subsequently triggered protracted wars against the returning of Dutch and French colonial powers. Following the surrender of Japan by dropping two atomic bombs on Hiroshima and Nagasaki and the end of World War II, France and the Netherlands finally recognized the independence of Vietnam and Indonesia, respectively, in 1949, after these nations had already declared independence in August 1945, leading to prolonged independence struggles. France recognized Vietnam as a "free state" within the French Union in 1946, Thailand (then known as the Kingdom of Siam) promptly established diplomatic relations with the "Republic of Indonesia" in March 1950, shortly after the Netherlands officially recognized Indonesia's sovereignty in December 1949. France also recognized a "free state" within its Union in 1949, while the Netherlands formally transferred sovereignty to Indonesia in December 1949. Both Cambodia and Laos gained their full independence from France in late 1953.

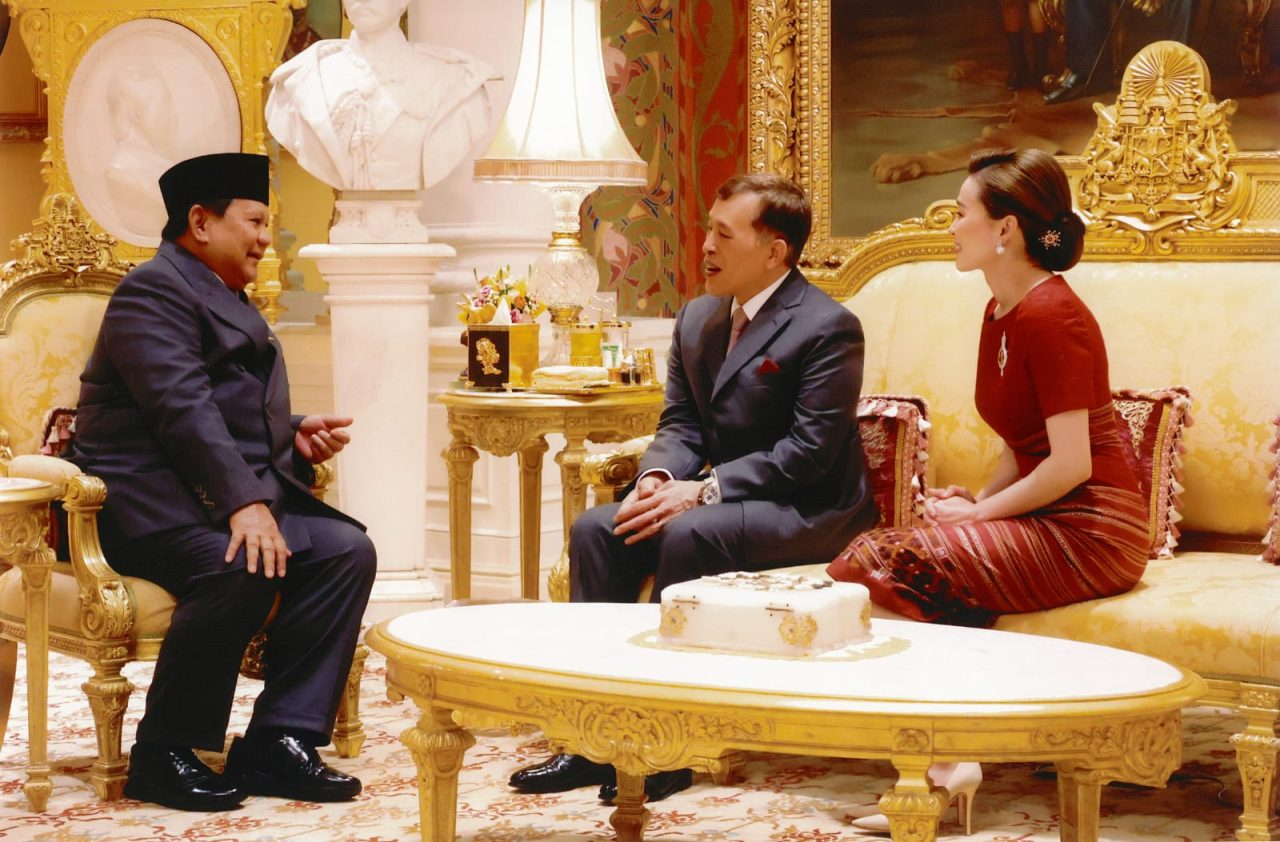
Indonesian President Prabowo Subianto meeting with King Vajiralongkorn and Queen Suthida at the Amphorn Royal Palace.

In 1967, both nations, together with the Philippines, Malaysia and Singapore met in Bangkok to establishes ASEAN to ensure peace and stability in the region. Both nations enjoys close and cordial relationship ever since. Thailand and Indonesia held contrasting positions during the Vietnam War, with Thailand become a major military ally of the United States and South Vietnam, The Indonesian leader Sukarno upgraded diplomatic ties with Hanoi to the ambassadorial level and severed relations with South Vietnam, recognizing the National Liberation Front (Viet Cong) and allowing them to open an office in Jakarta. The People's Army of Vietnam (PAVN) and Viet Cong launched the decisive Spring Offensive from March to April 1975 had led the Fall of Saigon, which marked the end of the "Vietnam War". On 2 July 1976, Hanoi was named the capital of the unified nation, while the former South Vietnamese capital, Saigon, was officially renamed "Ho Chi Minh City" to honor the late revolutionary leader. After the reunification, the government began enforcing socialist policies through nationwide, which included the collectivization of agriculture and the nationalization of private enterprises. The leader of unified Vietnam Lê Duẩn as the General Secretary attempted to transform Vietnam into a modern industrial socialist state using a Soviet-style "big push" model. Bangkok, Jakarta, and Ho Chi Minh City are major Southeast Asian economic hubs, with Singapore leading in wealth per capita with crucial parts of broader production and innovation chains, through powerhouses, driving regional growth through finance, trade, and large markets.

During Indonesian President Prabowo Subianto's visit to Thailand on 19 May 2025, a Memorandum of Understanding on health cooperation was signed between Thailand's Ministry of Public Health and Indonesia's Ministry of Health that aims to improve health financing, prevent and control communicable diseases, strengthen health systems and primary healthcare services, promote health tourism, and ensure the security of pharmaceuticals and medical supplies. The two nations also signed a government-to-government strategic partnership to serve as a foundation for long-term cooperation in a variety of critical sectors, including political and security matters, the fight against illegal gambling and human trafficking, and the development of trade, investment, and tourism ties.

== Trade ==
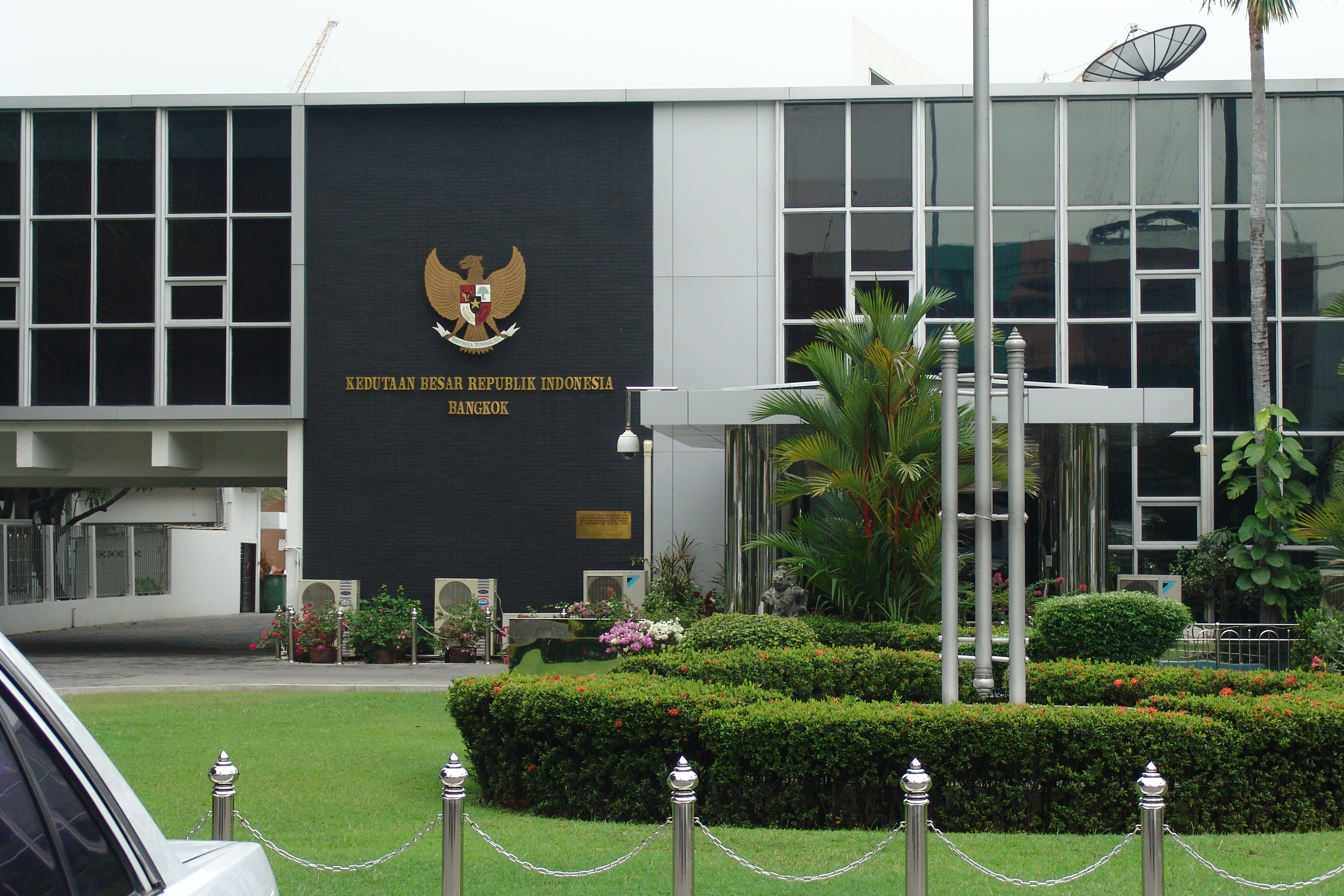
Indonesian Embassy in Bangkok

Indonesia is currently ranked sixth as a global trade partner with Thailand. In 2011, the trade value between Thailand and Indonesia was approximately 17 billion US dollars. Indonesia is Thailand's third-largest trading partner in ASEAN, after Malaysia and Singapore, and the trade volume between Thailand and Indonesia has grown over the years. Indonesia, with its large population, is a huge market for Thailand's agricultural products. Traditionally, Thailand is viewed as the supplier of food for Indonesia; for quite some times Indonesia have imported rice and fruits, especially durian, tamarind, custard apple, guava, pomelo, mango, and longan. On the other hand, Thailand's imports from Indonesia are dominated by energy commodities, such as coal, oil, and gas. However, the trade was unbalanced; Indonesia still recorded quite large trade deficit over the years. For most of the time, Thailand has enjoyed trade surpluses of US$1.2 billion in 2005, US$281 million in 2006 and US$1.2 billion in 2007. However, in September 2009, Indonesia had a trade surplus around US$62.7 million.

Although both nations vow to increase trade volumes and open more trade opportunities between ASEAN members through ASEAN Free Trade Area, nevertheless each countries often applied trade regulations to protect each economic interest. For example, Indonesian glass products in the form of glass blocks exported to Thailand are subjected to 30% trading protection duty for three years starting in 2011, in order to protect similar glass product of Thailand. In December 2017, both countries along with Malaysia launched a framework to allow payments of trade between them in respective local currencies.

== Tourism ==
Thailand is a popular destination for Indonesian tourists with 448,748 Indonesians visiting Thailand in 2012, ranked 16th of its foreign visitors nationalities. On the other hand, there were 141,771 Thai tourists visiting Indonesia in 2011 ranked 13th. Most Indonesians are attracted to popular Thai tourist destinations, such as Bangkok Grand Palace, Thai culture, food and nightlife, and also Phuket. Naturally, as a Buddhist nation, Thai visitors are attracted to Borobudur and also Bali. Borobudur, located in Central Java, is the world's largest Buddhist place of worship. Many visitors to Indonesia from Thailand make this the most popular destination.

== See also ==
- Indonesia–Malaysia–Thailand Growth Triangle
- Indonesia–Thailand border
