= Embassy of Indonesia, Bangkok =

Embassy of Indonesia, Bangkok Kedutaan Besar Republik Indonesia di Bangkok สถานเอกอัครราชทูตอินโดนีเซียประจำประเทศไทย

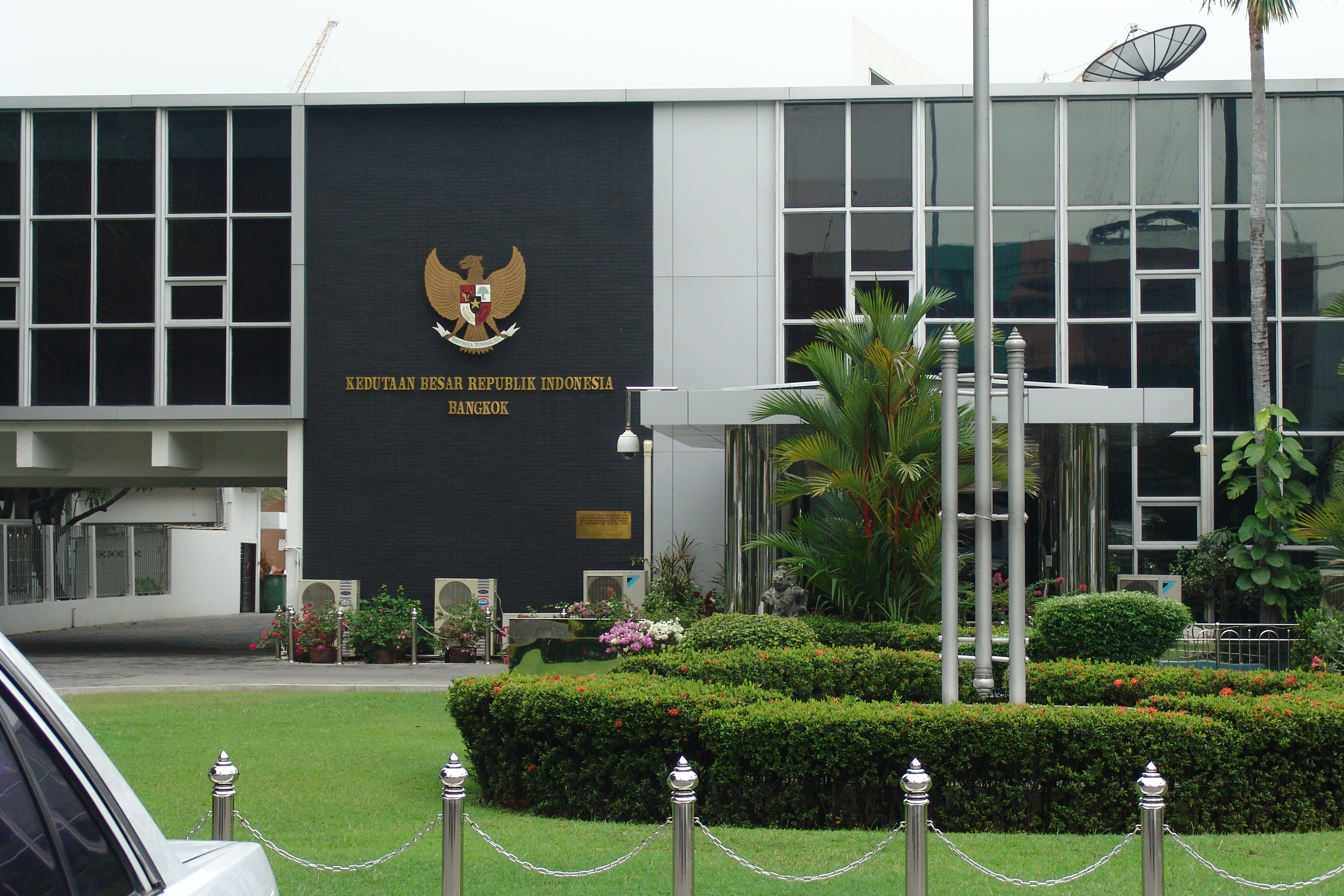
- Chancery of the Indonesian Embassy in Bangkok
- Location: Bangkok, Thailand
- Address: 600-602 Petchburi Road, Ratchathewi, Bangkok, Thailand
- Coordinates: 13.7508055°N 100.5365036°E
- Ambassador: Rachmat Budiman
- Website: indonesianembassybangkok.org

The Embassy of Indonesia in Bangkok (Indonesian: Kedutaan Besar Republik Indonesia di Bangkok; Thai: สถานเอกอัครราชทูตอินโดนีเซียประจำประเทศไทย), a diplomatic mission of the Republic of Indonesia to the Kingdom of Thailand and concurrently accredited to the United Nations Economic and Social Commission for Asia and the Pacific (UNESCAP), is located at 600-602 Petchburi Road, Ratchathewi District of Bangkok. The first Indonesian overseas mission in Bangkok was opened as the Indonesian Office (INDOFF) in 1947, which was promoted to Legation in 1949, and later Embassy in 1956.

== History ==
Indonesia, formerly the Dutch East Indies, first opened its representative mission in Bangkok under the name of INDOFF in 1947, which was located at a small soi beside Si Lom Road and headed by Izak Mahdi. The building of INDOFF acted as a headquarter of Indonesian people's independent movement during the Indonesian National Revolution, and independence activists like Adam Malik, later Vice President of Indonesia, stayed and met here, too. On 27 December 1949, about 1,000 Indonesians gathered at INDOFF to welcome the formal sovereignty transfer from the Dutch to the newly formed Republic of Indonesia, and INDOFF's status was promoted to Legation that year. Since January 1950 it moved a short distance to 349 Si Lom Road, and Malikuswari Muchtar Prabunegara was appointed as the new head of mission at the same year, whereas Mahdi was assigned to Beijing with the task of opening a new Indonesian mission there.

With formal diplomatic relations between Indonesia and Thailand established on 7 March 1950, the Indonesian Legation in Bangkok started to work on its current location in 1952, and the first Indonesian Ambassador to Thailand was appointed on 23 February. After the mission gained full status of Embassy on 1 January 1956, it started the construction of the new chancery on 9 January 1962. Mas Isman, then Indonesian Ambassador to Bangkok, laid the first cornerstone on the ceremony, and the Embassy temporarily rented 75 Phaya Thai Road as office during the construction period. It was not until September 1960 that the staff moved into the newly completed complex, which contained offices for Embassy sections, Ambassador's residence and facilities like meeting room, gymnasium, tennis court, and library. The Embassy-founded Indonesian School of Bangkok (opened on 6 October 1962) was also located inside the Embassy compound on Petchburi Road. The Indonesian Consulate-general in Songkhla, another diplomatic mission of Indonesia to Thailand, was established with the background of Indonesia–Malaysia–Thailand Growth Triangle's formation in 1993.

== See also ==
- Indonesia–Thailand relations
- List of diplomatic missions of Indonesia
- List of diplomatic missions in Thailand
