= Embassy of Germany, Bangkok =

Embassy of Germany, Bangkok สถานเอกอัครราชทูตเยอรมนีประจำประเทศไทย

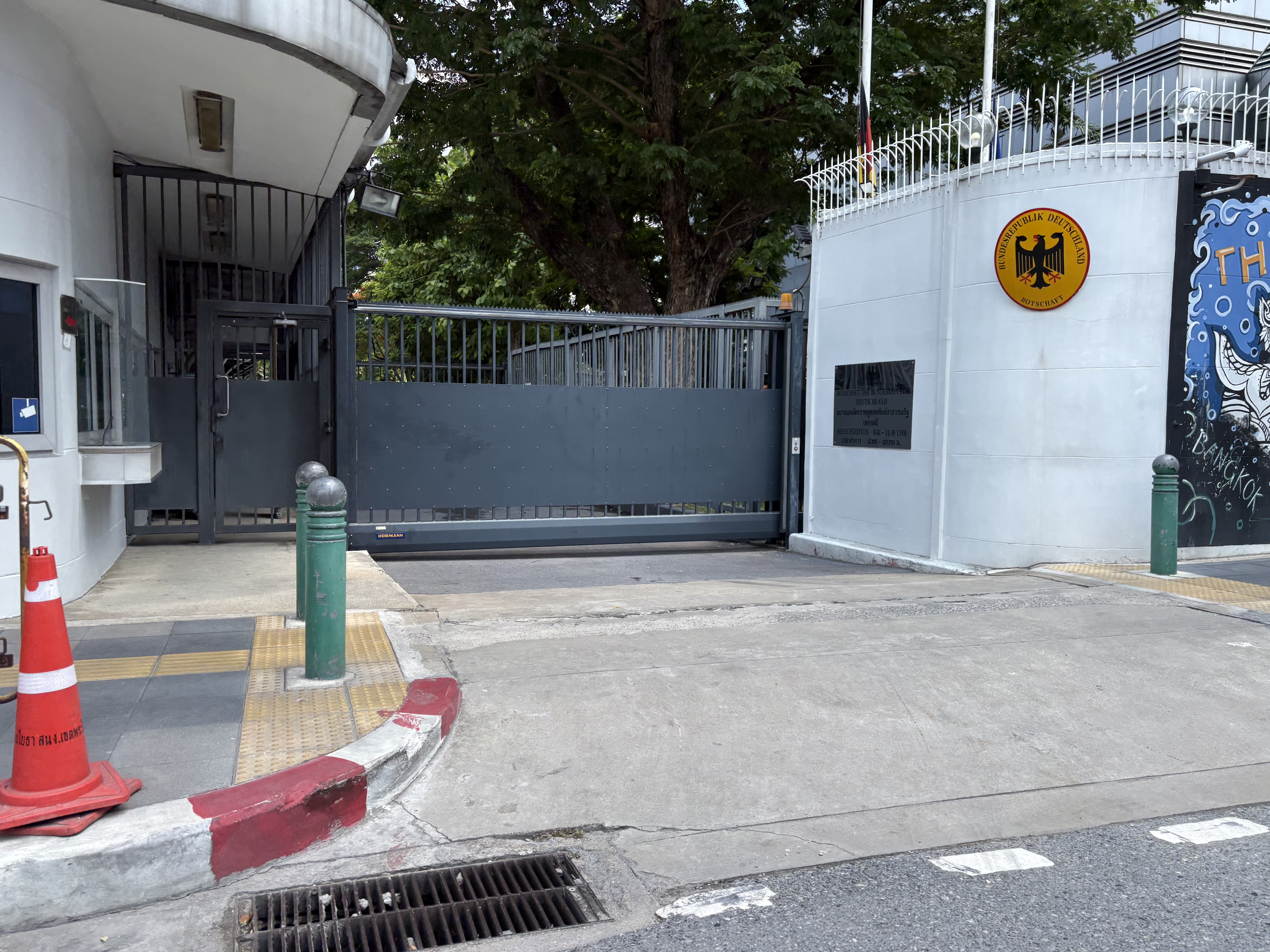
- Location: Bangkok, Thailand
- Address: 9 South Sathon Road, Sathon, Bangkok, Thailand
- Coordinates: 13.724064°N 100.541933°E
- Website: https://bangkok.diplo.de

The Embassy of Germany in Bangkok (German: Deutsche Botschaft Bangkok Thai: สถานเอกอัครราชทูตเยอรมนีประจำประเทศไทย) is the diplomatic mission of the Federal Republic of Germany to the Kingdom of Thailand. The embassy is located in the capital Bangkok (9 South Sathorn Road, Yan Nawa) on an area of c. 28,000m². The building is owned by the Government of Germany.

Current ambassador is Ambassador Michael Reiffenstuel, who took office in September 2026.

There are three Honorary consulates:

- Honorary consulate Northern Thailand in Chiang Mai
- Honorary consulate in South Thailand in Phuket
- Honorary consulate Eastern Thailand in Pattaya

== Organization ==
The embassy consists of seven sections.

- Administration
- Political Affairs (political section)
- Press relations (press office)
- Economic section
- Legal and Consular Affairs with Visa section
- Cultural Affairs
- Military Attaché

== Activities ==
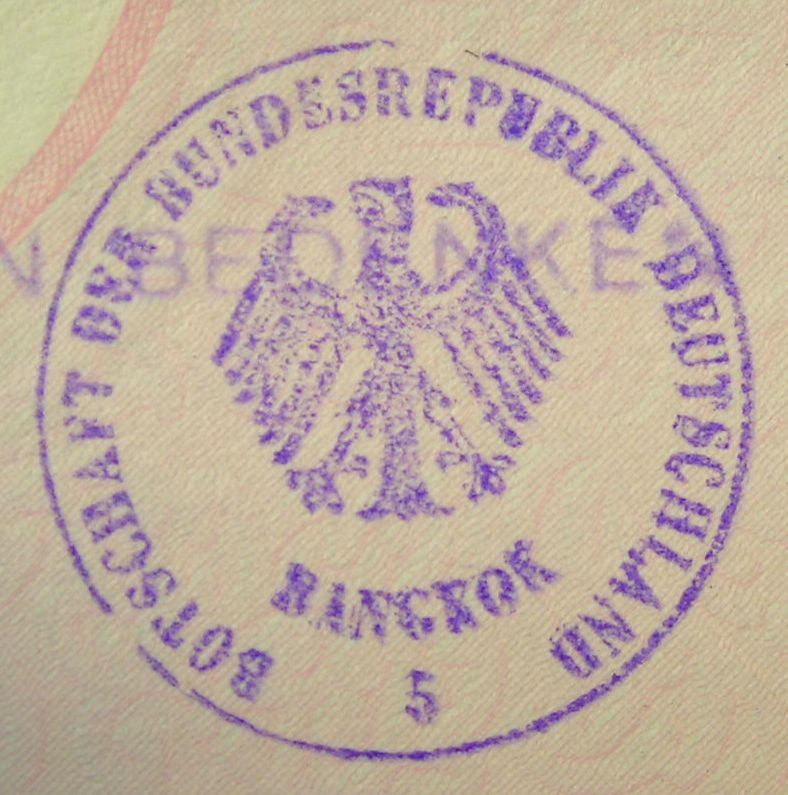
Seal of the embassy.

German nationals can register with the Embassy in order to receive information on consular matters and other Embassy activities. As being part of the German government, it oversees Goethe-Institut Bangkok. The embassy hosts its annual celebration of "Tag der deutschen Einheit" (German Unity Day) in Bangkok, welcoming around 1000 guests each year.

== See also ==
- Diplomatic missions of Germany
- Foreign relations of Germany
- List of diplomatic missions in Thailand
- Germany–Thailand relations
- Thai embassy in Berlin (Diplomatic missions of Thailand)
