= Sai (artist) =

Sai is a Burmese artist known for his works in support of Myanmar's pro-democracy movement.

Sai is the co-founder of Myanmar Peace Museum.

== Early life and education ==
Sai is the son of Linn Htut, a member of the National League for Democracy who served as the 2nd Chief Minister of Shan State from 2016 to 2021.

In 2019, Sai received a Goldsmiths Fellowship from the University of London.

Following the 2021 Myanmar coup d'état on 1 February 2021, Linn was detained. On 28 January 2022, he was charged with four counts of corruption and was sentenced to 16 years in prison. Sai's mother spent several months under house arrest, and now lives under heavy surveillance.

== Career ==
=== Myanmar ===
In the aftermath of the coup, Sai supported the protest movement, making riot shields and infographics on treating teargas exposure and gunshot wounds. Sai subsequently fled Myanmar.

=== Exile ===
In 2022, Sai opened a solo exhibition "Please Enjoy our Tragedies" featuring photography from his escape from Myanmar.

On 29 April 2025, Sai addressed a meeting of the All Party Parliamentary Group on Freedom of Religion or Belief led by Lord Alton of Liverpool.

==== 2025 ====
In July 2025, Sai co-curated an exhibit "Constellation of Complicity: Visualising the Global Machinery of Authoritarian Solidarity” at the Bangkok Art and Culture Centre (BACC). After the exhibit opened on 24 July 2025, the gallery was visited by officials from the Embassy of China in Bangkok, who demanded elements of the exhibit be censored or removed. The BACC was told by the Bangkok Metropolitan Administration the exhibit would be unable to continue if it did not remove elements considered "problematic" by the Chinese embassy, and removed several pieces.

Sai noted that "It is tragically ironic that an exhibition on authoritarian cooperation has been censored under authoritarian pressure. Thailand has long been a refuge for dissidents. This is a chilling signal to all exiled artists and activists in the region." Sai subsequently fled Thailand.
