= Zhou Junyi =

Chinese activist

Zhou Junyi (Chinese: 周俊义) is a Chinese pro-democracy activist based in Bangkok. Zhou is a member of the China Democracy Party, which is banned in China.

== Career ==
Zhou fled China in 2015, arriving in Thailand. On 4 June 2025, Zhou organized a memorial for the Tiananmen Square massacre in Kanchanaburi. He was subsequently arrested in Bangkok on 11 June 2025 for visa offenses.

On 13 July 2026, Zhou appeared on a Human Rights Watch list of Chinese dissidents in Thailand at risk of being deported back to China, along with Zhang Xinyan, Bai Zhaodong, and Tan Yixiang.
