= Tenzin Mingyur Paldron =

Tibetan artist

- Born: 1984 (age 41–42); New Delhi, India

Academic background
- Education: Evergreen State College (BA); University of California, Berkeley (PhD)
- Thesis: Tibet, China, and the United States: Self-immolation and the limits of understanding (2021)

Tenzin Mingyur Paldron (Tibetan: བསྟན་འཛིན་མི་འགྱུར་དཔལ་སྒྲོན, Wylie: bstan 'dzin mi 'gyur dpal sgron; born 1984), also known as Doc Tenzin, is a Tibetan artist, focused on issues of LGBTQ persons and sexual violence within the Tibetan diaspora.

== Early life and education ==
Tenzin Mingyur Paldron was born as a refugee in New Delhi, India, in 1984.

He attended Seattle Central Community College before receiving his Bachelor of Arts from Evergreen State College, and his Doctor of Philosophy in rhetoric from UC Berkeley in the United States.

In 2011, Paldron co-authored a bill proposed by the Berkeley City Council recognizing self-immolation protests by Tibetans in China as a response to Chinese Government oppression.

== Career ==
Paldron's work is focused on issues of LGBTQ persons and sexual violence within the Tibetan diaspora.

He often explores fluidity of gender, including in a 2024 video commission titled "Power, Masculinity and Mindfulness" and displayed in the "Reimagine: Himalayan Art Now" exhibit at the Rubin Museum of Art.

=== 2025 censorship by China ===
In July 2025, Paldron's work was featured in the Bangkok Art and Culture Centre (BACC) exhibit "Constellation of Complicity: Visualising the Global Machinery of Authoritarian Solidarity", including a video of Tibetans carrying Palestinian flags, and a film titled "Listen to Indigenous People". Following a visit to the exhibit by officials from the Chinese Embassy in Bangkok and Bangkok Metropolitan Administration, the Embassy officials demanded the removal of Paldron's work from the exhibit. The BACC complied, leading to condemnation by the human rights and art communities, including Maya Wang, associate China director at Human Rights Watch.
