= Saudi Arabia–Thailand relations =

- Saudi Arabia: Thailand

Diplomatic mission
- Embassy of Saudi Arabia, Bangkok: Embassy of Thailand, Riyadh

Envoy
- Chargé d'Affaires: Chargé d'Affaires

Saudi Arabia–Thailand relations refers to the current and historical relations between Saudi Arabia and Thailand. Saudi Arabia has an embassy in Bangkok and Thailand has an embassy in Riyadh but representation is at the chargé d'affaires rather than ambassadorial level. However, Saudi Arabia and Thailand aim to restore the relations between their two nations. Relations between the two countries were established in 1957 and hundreds of thousands of Thai people went to Saudi Arabia to work. The historically friendly and strategic partnership between Saudi Arabia and Thailand has deteriorated significantly following the Blue Diamond Affair. Although regardless of relation status, Saudi Arabia and Thailand have high trade between two nations (see § Economic Relations). In recent years Saudi Arabia and Thailand have shown intent to repair the relations between the two kingdoms. On 26 January 2022, both countries announced they restored full diplomatic relations and would appoint ambassadors.

== History ==
The two countries have enjoyed warm and cordial relationships even before the establishment of formal diplomatic ties on 1 October 1957 with resident representative in their respective capitals. In 1966 the status of their relation was upgraded to ambassador level, the first Saudi Arabian ambassador to Thailand was H.E. Abdulrahman Al-Omran while H.E. Prasong Suwanpradhes was the first Thai ambassador accredited to Saudi Arabia.

Relations between the two Kingdoms have been further strengthened by the visit to Saudi Arabia in January 1984 of the Thai delegation led by Thai deputy foreign minister Prapas Limpabhandhu and high-ranking officials from the Ministry of Interior, Ministry of Commerce, Ministry of Agriculture and Cooperatives, as well as representatives from the Thai Parliament and the private sector.

According to Thai author Achara Ashayagachat: "Before the downgrade and sanctions, up to 500,000 Thais worked in Saudi Arabia. Now perhaps just 100 are there. Thousands of students once studied in Saudi Arabia, but now only 300 do."

According to the Royal Thai Embassy in Riyadh, Saudi Arabia: "Thailand and Saudi Arabia always share similar views on major regional and international issues, especially those of vital importance to international peace and security. Both countries are working closely and supported each other's position in the United Nations and at other international fora."

== Key Events ==
Date	Key event
1 October 1957	Establishment of diplomatic ties
1966	Exchange of resident ambassador level
1981	Saudi Arabia Fund for Development loaned Thailand US$51.47 million for Lignite Electricity Plant in Mae Moh, Thailand.
1984	Official visit to Saudi Arabia of Thai Deputy Foreign minister Prapas Limprabhan
1985	Official visit to Saudi Arabia of Thai Foreign Minister (ACM Siddhi Savetsila). Islamic Development Bank (IDB) granted Baht 32 million for construction of Islamic College in Yala Province, Southern Thailand.
Late 1990	Official visit to Saudi Arabia of Thai foreign minister Dr. Arthit Urairat.
February 1993	Official visit to Saudi Arabia of Thai deputy foreign minister Dr. Surin Pitsuwan.
1995	Official visit to Saudi Arabia of Thai deputy foreign minister Dr. Surin Pitsuwan with signing an Agreement on "Avoidance of Double Taxation" with Saudi side.
1998–99	Permanent Secretary of Ministry of Commerce of Thailand visited to Saudi Arabia.
1999–2001	The Custodian of the Two Holy Mosques, King Fahd Bin Abdulaziz Al Saud, has sponsored Thai pilgrims to perform Haj over 1,000 persons.
20 April 2004	Official visit to Saudi Arabia of H.E. Dr. Surakiart Sathirathai, Minister of Foreign Affairs of Thailand. The minister was granted an audience with the crown prince Abdullah Ibn Abdul Aziz Al Saud.
8 January 2005	Saudi Government sent a condolence and provided humanitarian assistance to Tsunami affected communities in Thailand worth US$1 million
6 April 2005	The 4th Asia Cooperation Dialogue Ministerial Meeting in Islamabad accepted Saudi Arabia as member with persuasion and great support from Thailand.
8–10 May 2005	Signing MOU for Amendment of Agreement on Air Services in Jeddah.
22–23 May 2005	Visit to Saudi Arabia of Chairman of the Federation of Thai Industries and party.
2 August 2005	The King, Queen and Crown Princess of Thailand sent messages of condolence to Crown Prince Abdullah for the demise of King Fahd.
3 August 2005	Official visit to Saudi Arabia of Kanthathi Suphamongkhon, Minister of Foreign Affairs, in the capacity as the King's and Thai Government's Representative, to attend King Fahd's funeral ceremony. Had an audience with King Abdullah who ascended to the throne on 1 August 2005.
16 November 2005	Official visit to Saudi Arabia of Surakiart Sathirathai, Deputy Prime Minister, who met with Prince Saud Al-Faisal, Minister of Foreign Affairs of Saudi Arabia, to deliver an invitation letter to King Abdullah to attend the Royal Ceremony on the occasion of 60th Anniversary of Accession to the Throne of King Bhumibol Adulyadej of Thailand.
19–24 November 2005	Five members of the Shoura Council (Saudi Consultative Council) attended the 6th General Assembly of the Association of Asian Parliament hosted by the Thai Parliament.
25–26 January 2022	Thailand's prime minister Prayut Chan-o-cha makes an official two-day visit to Saudi Arabia at the invite of the crown prince of Saudi Arabia. This marks the first high-level visit in three decades between the two countries.
28 February 2022	Saudia resumes direct passenger flights to Thailand after a gap of around 32 years.
17-19 November 2022	Saudi crown prince Mohammed bin Salman visited Thailand and met with Thai king Maha Vajiralongkorn and Thai prime minister Prayut Chan-o-cha on the sidelines of the APEC forum.

== Economic relations ==
Thailand imported mainly crude oil, petrochemical products and fertilizer while exporting to Saudi Arabia motor cars auto part and accessories, air conditioning machine, refrigerators, prepared or preserved fish, woven fabrics, washing machines, machinery, garments, rice etc.

== Thai labour in Saudi Arabia ==
Pre-Gulf War (1990) Saudi Arabia was the largest market for Thai oversea workers with its number over 200,000.. At present, according to the statistic provided by the Ministry of Foreign Affairs of Saudi Arabia, 10,000 Thais remain in the kingdom.

== Hajj and Islamic affairs ==
Thailand, with its nearly 3 million Muslim population ascribes considerable importance to events in the two holy cities. The historical links between Thailand and Saudi Arabia could be traced back to the early days of the establishment of the Kingdom of Saudi Arabia. The number of Thai pilgrims performing the fifth pillar of Islam each year number approximately between 9,000 and 10,000.

In 2005, the number of Thai pilgrims performing religious rituals in the holy cities of Makkah and Madinah reached 10,124.

== Blue Diamond Affair fallout ==
The Blue Diamond Affair was a series of events triggered by the 1989 theft of gems belonging to the Saudi royal family by a Thai employee. Mohammad al-Ruwaili, a Saudi Arabian businessman close to the Saudi royal family traveled to Bangkok to investigate the case, but was abducted and killed. Three months later, three officials from the Saudi Embassy were also shot to death in Bangkok. The murders remained unsolved as of 2006. The affair soured relations between Saudi Arabia and Thailand. In response Saudi Arabia stopped issuing working visas for Thais and discouraged its citizens from visiting the country.. Although there is a ban on travel, many Saudis violate it and travel to the Kingdom of Thailand, Elias Siyaman, a tourist company representative, said there is clear growth in the number of Saudi tourists, who come in fourth place among Gulf tourists. They travel via the closest airports to Bangkok. A large percentage of Saudi nationals come for tourism. Diplomatic missions were downgraded to chargé d'affaires level. The number of Thai workers in Saudi Arabia fell from more than 200,000 in before the theft to around 10,000 in 2008.

According to Arab News:

It is to be recalled that the negligence of Thai authorities to investigate a number of security cases, where some Saudi citizens were victims, led to the deterioration of relations between the Kingdom and Thailand for more than 20 years. The Kingdom clearly asked Thailand to achieve justice in these cases in accordance with international treaties and conventions. Since then, the Saudi Embassy in Thailand has spared no efforts in urging Thai officials for an end to all such cases in order to restore diplomatic and business relations between the two countries.

The fifth charge d'affaires since the 1990 diplomatic downgrade said many Thais and Saudis want to see warmer ties. "My mission is to communicate and see to the final resolution of this court case. The ball is in the Thai court now and Saudi Arabia is ready to celebrate together," he said as Riyadh awaits the verdict from the Court of Appeal, following last year's ruling by the Court of First Instance. The Ruwaili family petitioned the King and appealed to the Appeal Court. "We will proceed through to the end [the highest court]. "I'm amazed and am wondering why Thai authorities can find culprits for [the murders of] British nationals but not for us," he said, adding the Ruwaili case was the only remaining chance for justice. "Whether we can restore good ties between us relies solely on this case." I believe the Thai government has good intentions to normalise relations. But the restoration will have to be done without the rights of our citizens being infringed upon," Mr Alsheaiby said. Several businesses are keen to invest in Thailand, but they have been prohibited because of economic sanctions, he said. The Saudi low-cost airline, Flynas, is keen to launch a route between Jeddah and Bangkok to tap the market for tourists and Haj-Umrah pilgrims. Currently, most flights between Saudi Arabia and Southeast Asia are via the Philippines and Indonesia as they supply workers to the Saudis. "Once relations are restored the Saudi private sector would like to hire Thais rather than other nationals," Mr Alsheaiby said.

== Restoration of diplomatic relations ==
Relations between Saudi Arabia and Thailand were severely strained following the 1989 Blue Diamond Affair, after which Saudi Arabia downgraded diplomatic relations and restricted ties with Thailand. The dispute affected tourism, trade and labour relations between the two countries for decades. Relations began to improve in the 2010s and were formally restored in 2022, when the two countries resumed full diplomatic relations after more than 30 years of strained ties..

Since the restoration of diplomatic relations, Saudi Arabia and Thailand have sought to strengthen bilateral cooperation, particularly in tourism, trade and investment. The renewed relationship has also led to increased travel between the two countries, with Thailand seeking to attract more Saudi tourists and Saudi Arabia promoting closer economic and commercial ties with Thailand.

== Resident diplomatic missions ==
- Saudi Arabia has an embassy in Bangkok.
- Thailand has an embassy in Riyadh and a consulate-general in Jeddah.

== See also ==
- Foreign relations of Saudi Arabia
- Foreign relations of Thailand
