= South Korea–Thailand relations =

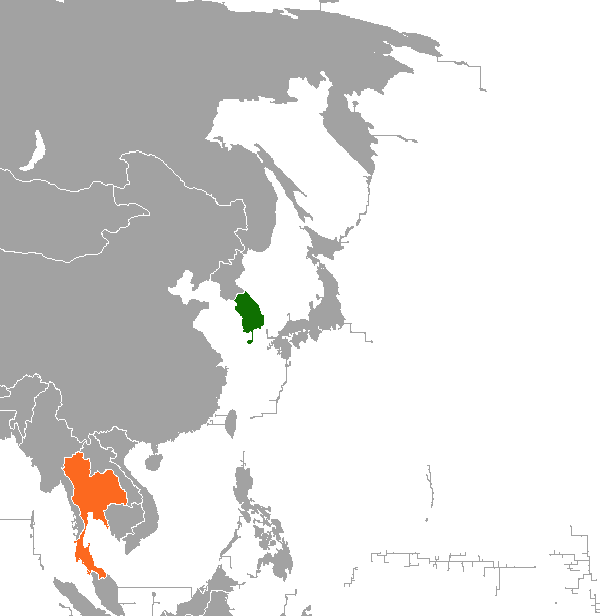
- South Korea: Thailand

Diplomatic mission
- Embassy of South Korea, Bangkok: Embassy of Thailand, Seoul

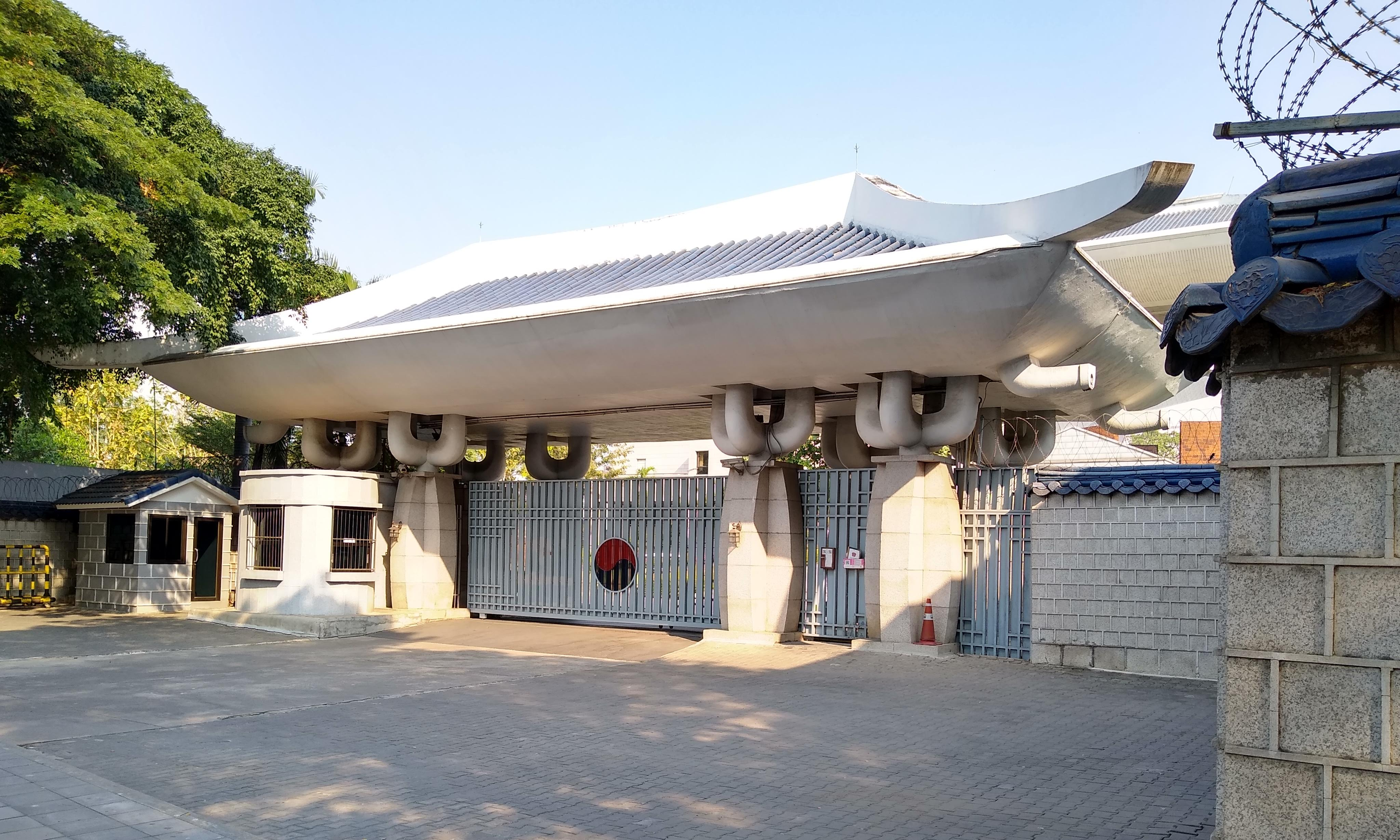
South Korean embassy in Bangkok

South Korea–Thailand relations are the bilateral relations between Republic of Korea and Kingdom of Thailand. The two countries established diplomatic relations on 1 October 1958.

During the Korean War, Thailand was the second nation to send troops—a total of over 10,000—to support South Korea, just after the United States. Thai casualties included 137 dead and more than 300 wounded.

The Industry Ministry reported that Thailand and South Korea had trade value of US$11.7 billion in 2017. As of 2020, 400 South Korean companies have invested in Thailand, and trade between Thailand and South Korea stands at around US$15 billion (470 billion baht) annually.

== Cultural relations ==
Since 2015, Korean pop groups and television dramas have surged in popularity in Thailand, to the extent that a phrase, "Korean wave" Thai: กระแสเกาหลี; RTGS: krasae kaoli) has been coined to explain the phenomenon. K-pop in particular has influenced Thai food, fashion, and interest in cosmetic surgery.

== Resident diplomatic missions ==
- South Korea has an embassy in Bangkok.
- Thailand has an embassy in Seoul.

== See also ==
- Foreign relations of South Korea
- Foreign relations of Thailand
