= Taipei Economic and Cultural Office, Bangkok =

Representative office of the Republic of China in Thailand

Taipei Economic and Cultural Office in Thailand 駐泰國台北經濟文化辦事處
- สำนักงานเศรษฐกิจและวัฒนธรรมไทเปประจำประเทศไทย

Agency overview
- Formed: 1975 (as Office of the Representative of China Airlines); 1980 (as Far East Trade Office); 1991 (as Taipei Economic and Trade Center); 1992 (as Taipei Economic and Trade Office); 1999 (as Taipei Economic and Cultural Office)
- Jurisdiction: Thailand; Myanmar; Bangladesh
- Headquarters: Bangkok
- Agency executive: Peter Sha-li Lan, Representative
- Website: Taipei Economic and Cultural Office in Thailand

The Taipei Economic and Cultural Office in Thailand (Chinese: 駐泰國台北經濟文化辦事處; pinyin: Zhù Tàiguó Táiběi Jīngjì Wénhuà Bànshì Chù) (Thai: สำนักงานเศรษฐกิจและวัฒนธรรมไทเปประจำประเทศไทย RTGS: Samnakngan Setthakit Lae Wattanatham Taipe Pracham Prathet Thai) is the representative office of Taiwan in Thailand, which functions as a de facto embassy in the absence of diplomatic relations.

The Office has joint responsibility for Bangladesh with the Taipei Economic and Cultural Center in India in New Delhi. Between 2004 and 2009, affairs with Bangladesh were handled by the Taipei Economic and Cultural Office in Bangladesh in Dhaka.

Its counterpart body in Taiwan is the Thailand Trade and Economic Office in Taipei.

== History ==
Until 1975, Taiwan, as the Republic of China, had an embassy in Bangkok, but this was closed after Thailand established full diplomatic relations with the People's Republic of China, leading to its replacement in September of that year by the Office of the Representative of China Airlines in Thailand.

It was renamed the Far East Trade Office in 1980. The office was upgraded in 1991, and renamed the Taipei Economic and Trade Center, before being renamed again as the Taipei Economic and Trade Office in 1992. It adopted its present name in 1999.

The Office jointly organizes the Taiwan Documentary and Film Festival in Thailand with the Thailand-based Documentary Club, the New Taipei City Government and the Taiwan Film and Audiovisual Institute. In July 2026, Khaosod reported the Chinese Embassy in Bangkok attempted to pressure festival organizers to remove the logo of Taiwan's Ministry of Culture from the festival. Organizers did not comply.

== Representatives ==
- Kelly Hsieh (2015–2017)
- Tung Chen-yuan (2017–2020)
- Lee Ying-yuan (2020–2021)
- Chuang Suo-hang (2022–2023)
- Chun-Fu Chang (2023–2025)
- Peter Sha-li Lan (2025–)

== See also ==
- List of diplomatic missions of Taiwan
- Taipei Economic and Cultural Representative Office
