= Blue Diamond Affair =

International incident between Saudi Arabia and Thailand

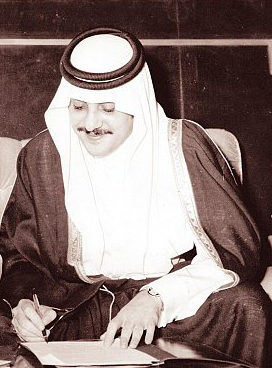
Faisal bin Fahd (1978)

The Blue Diamond Affair was an international incident between Saudi Arabia and Thailand triggered by the 1989 theft of gems belonging to the House of Saud by a Thai employee. The affair has soured relations between the two nations for over 30 years.

== Theft ==
In 1989, Kriangkrai Techamong, a Thai worker, stole 91 kg (200 pounds) of jewellery and other valuable gems from the palace of Prince Faisal bin Fahd, where he was employed as a servant. Kriangkrai had access to the prince's bedroom and hid the stolen jewelry in a vacuum cleaner bag at the palace. It included a valuable 50 carat blue diamond and other gems, which Kriangkrai then shipped to his home in Lampang Province, Thailand. The jewels proved difficult to dispose of. He began selling items for a pittance. A Bangkok jeweller, Santhi Sithanakan, learned of the sales and bought most of the gems from Kriangkrai at a fraction of their value.

== Recovery ==
A Royal Thai Police investigation headed by Lieutenant-General Chalor Kerdthes led to Kriangkrai's arrest, Santhi's interrogation and the recovery of most of the stolen jewellery. Kriangkai was sentenced to seven years in prison, but he was released after three years as he cooperated with the police and had confessed.

Chalor's team flew to Saudi Arabia to return the stolen items. However, the Saudi authorities discovered that the blue diamond was missing and that about half of the gems returned were fake.

In Bangkok, rumours spread in the local press that charity gala photos captured a number of government officials' wives wearing diamond necklaces resembling those stolen from the Saudi palace. This fuelled Saudi Arabian suspicions that Thai police and VIPs had taken the jewels for themselves.

== Investigation ==
Mohammad al-Ruwaili, a Saudi Arabian businessman close to the Saudi royal family, travelled to Bangkok to investigate on his own. He went missing on 12 February 1990 and is presumed to have been murdered. Prior to his disappearance, on 4 January 1989, a Saudi diplomat was murdered in Si Lom, Bang Rak District, Bangkok. On 1 February 1990, three more Saudi diplomats were murdered in Thung Mahamek in Bangkok's Yan Nawa District. The murders remain unsolved, and no connection to the jewellery theft has been established, despite the Saudi government's view "...that the Thai government had not done enough to resolve the mystery surrounding Al-Ruwaili's assassination and that of three other Saudi diplomats."

Lieutenant-General Chalor was later charged and convicted of ordering the 1995 murder of the wife and son of a gem dealer allegedly involved in the affair, and he was sentenced to death. The Supreme Court of Thailand upheld the judgment and sentenced Chalor to death on 16 October 2009. However, Chalor's sentence was reduced to fifty years imprisonment by King Bhumibol Adulyadej on the King's 84th birthday. Chalor received a royal pardon and was released in August 2015.

Six other policemen were also convicted of involvement in the murders. One of those involved, Police Lieutenant-Colonel Pansak Mongkolsilp, was sentenced in 2002 to life in prison. The term was upheld on appeal in 2005, but he was released in 2012.

== Diplomatic and economic repercussions ==
Relations between the two countries worsened further following the murders. Saudi Arabia stopped issuing work visas for Thais and discouraged its own citizens from visiting Bangkok. Diplomatic missions were downgraded to the chargé d'affaires level. The number of Thais working in Saudi Arabia fell from 150,000-200,000 in 1989 to just 10,000 in 2008. The cost to Thailand was about 200 billion baht (US$5.6 billion) in remittances, as fewer Thai workers were permitted to work in Saudi Arabia. On 25 January 2022, country officials decided to restore full diplomatic relations.

== Aftermath ==
On 17 March 2016, Kriangkrai Techamong, then 65, told reporters at his home in Lampang that he would become a monk for the remainder of his life to repent for his dishonest actions. He had spent nearly five years in Thai prisons for his theft. Kriangkrai said he believed the missing Blue Diamond was cursed and said its theft had brought a series of calamities on himself and his family.

Chalor Kerdthes was granted a royal pardon and was released in August 2015. He was present at Kriangkrai's ordination ceremony.

On 22 March 2019, Thailand's Supreme Court acquitted five police officers charged with the abduction and murder of Saudi businessman Mohammad al-Ruwaili in 1990. The court cited lack of evidence. Over the years, charges against the men were repeatedly thrown out. A criminal court dismissed the case in 2014, a ruling upheld by an appeals court the following year.

== Related topic ==
- Saudi Arabia–Thailand relations
