= Mukaddas Mijit =

Uyghur artist and ethnomusicologist

Mukaddas Mijit is a Uyghur artist and ethnomusicologist based in France, known for her documentary films about Uyghur culture.

== Early life and education ==
Mukaddas was born in 1982 in Ürümqi, capital of the Xinjiang Uyghur Autonomous Region, China. She studied classical piano and dance at the Ürümqi Institute of Arts, and in 2003 moved to Paris to study ethnomusicology at the University of Paris-Ouest Nanterre.

== Career ==
Mijit co-directed the 2024 film Nikah with Bastien Ehouzan, set in Xinjiang in 2017, the fictional film follows a young woman experience Chinese government surveillance and detention of her community members. The film was positively received by critics, who cited its depiction of Uyghur culture as "both alive and vulnerable", and the subsequent "shattering" of the culture.

=== 2025 censorship by China ===
In July 2025, Mijit's work was featured in the Bangkok Art and Culture Centre (BACC) exhibit "Constellation of Complicity: Visualising the Global Machinery of Authoritarian Solidarity". Following a visit to the exhibit by officials from the Chinese Embassy in Bangkok, Mijit's name, along with the names of Hong Kong artists Clara Cheung and Gun Cheng Yee Man from Hong Kong, Tibetan artist Doc Tenzin, were blacked out.

== Filmography ==
- Moman, The Great Woman (2012)
- “Morning Feeling” and Perhat Tursun (2021)
- Nikah (2024)
