= Bangkok Art and Culture Centre =

Contemporary art centre in Thailand

Coordinates: 13°44′48″N 100°31′48″E

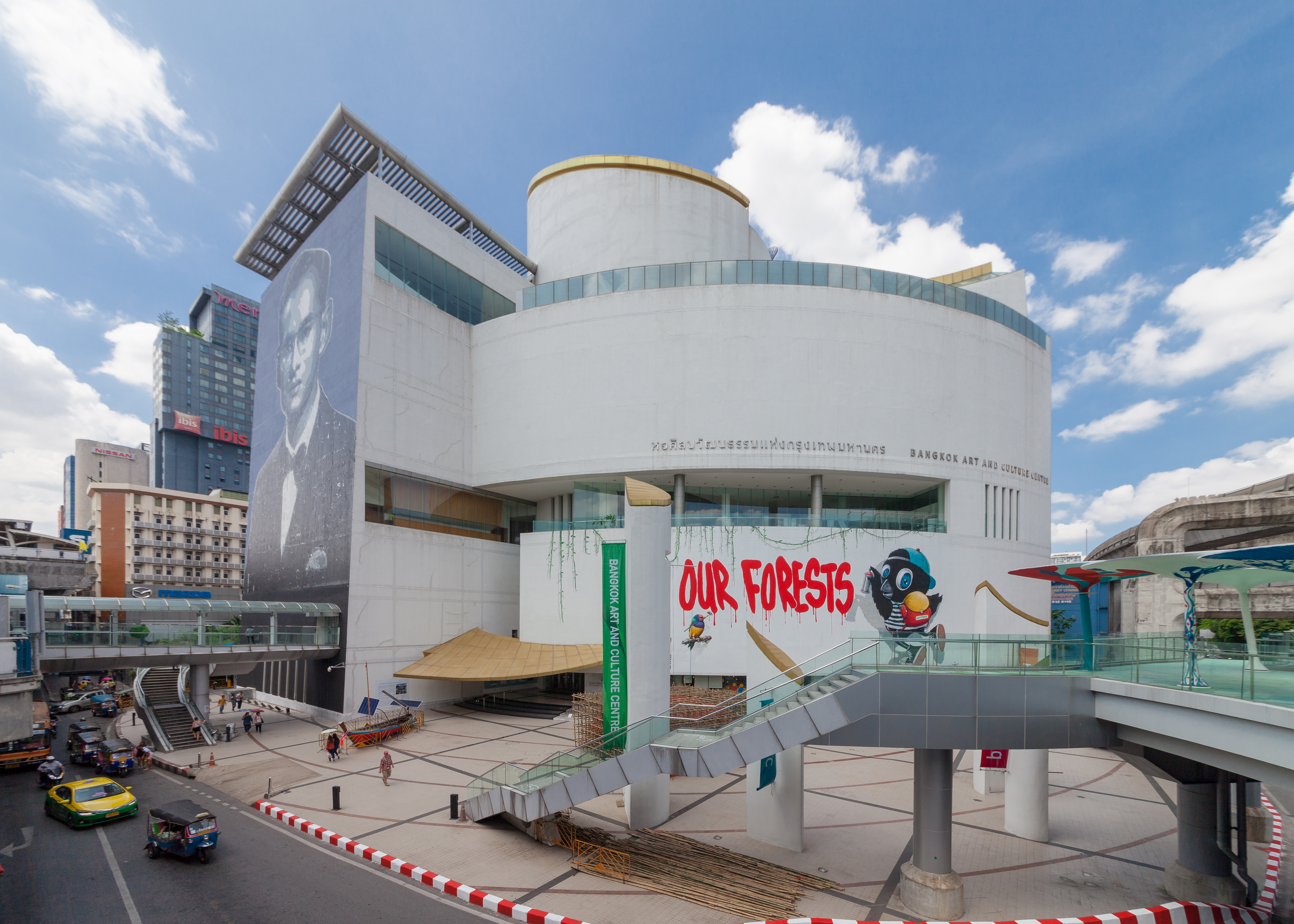
- Former name: Art Centre
- Established: 29 July 2008
- Location: 939 Rama 1 Road, Wangmai, Pathum Wan, Bangkok 10330
- Type: Contemporary Art, museum
- Director: Pawit Mahasarinand
- Website: www.bacc.or.th

Bangkok Art and Culture Centre (BACC; Thai: หอศิลปวัฒนธรรมแห่งกรุงเทพมหานคร) is a contemporary arts centre in Siam area, Bangkok, Thailand. Art, music, theatre, film, design and cultural/educational events take place in its exhibition and performance spaces. The centre includes cafes, commercial art galleries, bookshops, craft shops, and an art library. It is intended as a venue for cultural exchange, giving Bangkok an operational base on the international art scene. The number of visitors has risen from 300,000 in BACC's first year in 2007 to 1.7 million visitors in 2017. It is served by the National Stadium BTS station on the Silom Line.

== History ==
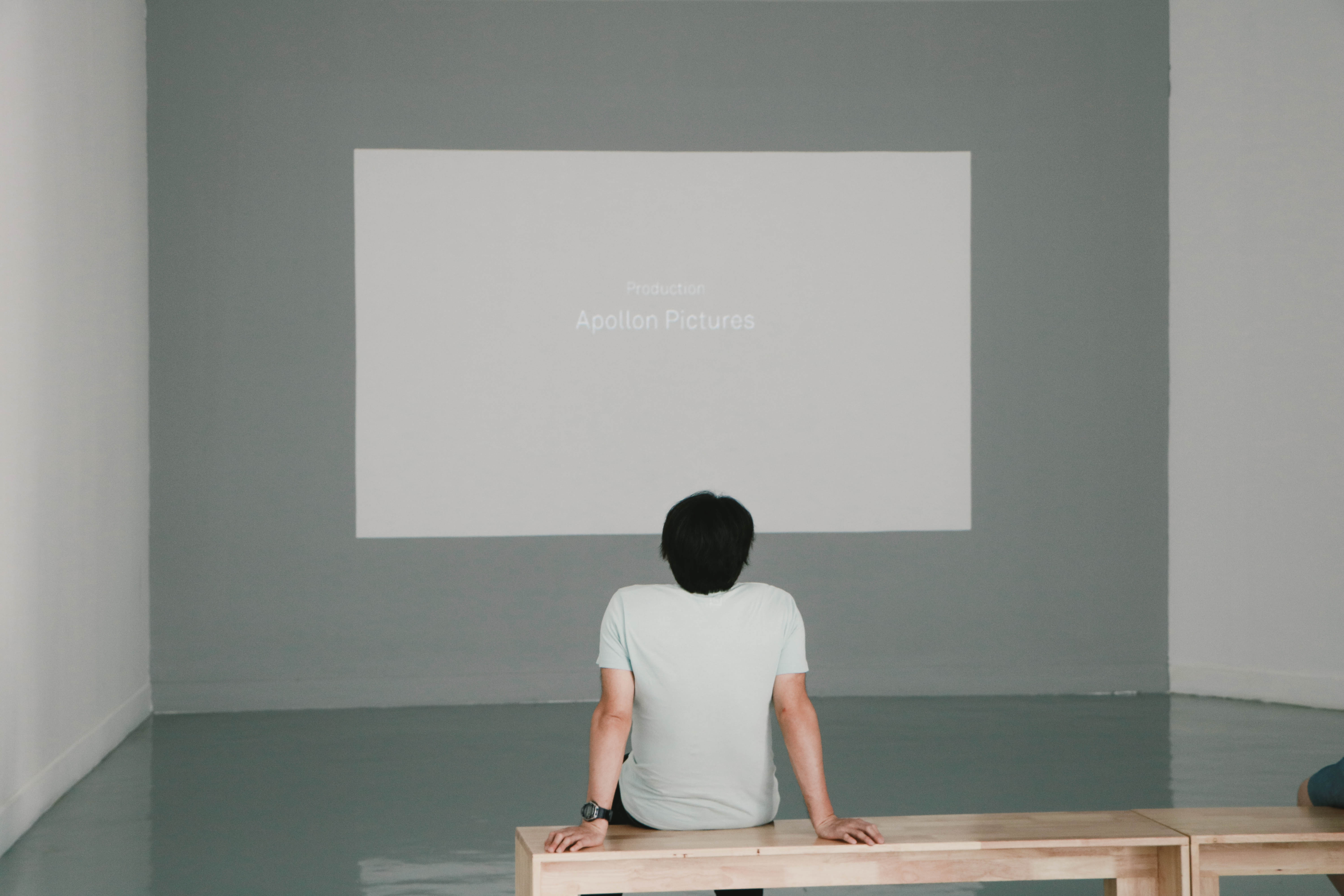
Inside BACC

In 1995, Bangkok Governor Dr. Bhichit Rattakul began a project called "the art centre". After agreement that The Bangkok Contemporary Art Centre should be near Pathumwan junction, the project was stopped in 2001 when Samak Sundaravej became the new governor. He wanted a commercial retail space and private investors. Cultural organizations, artists, students, and media joined to oppose the suspension. In 2004, Apirak Kosayodhin became Bangkok Governor. The project was presented again and the governor agreed to the original project that the art centre should be designed following the original plan.

On 19 August 2005 a "Declaration of Cooperation in the Fields of Art and Culture by Bangkok Metropolitan Administration (BMA) and Allied Organizations in the Fields of Art and Culture" was signed at Benjasiri Park. On 29 July 2008 the Bangkok Art and Culture Centre opened after many delays.

=== 2025 censorship of artwork critical of China ===
On 24 July 2025, the BACC opened the "Constellation of Complicity: Visualising the Global Machinery of Authoritarian Solidarity" exhibition on authoritarian governments, including materials critical of China's treatment of Hong Kong and ethnic minorities. The exhibition was organized by the Myanmar Peace Museum.

On 27 July 2025, staff from the Embassy of China in Bangkok entered the exhibit along with Bangkok Metropolitan Administration (BMA) officials and demanded its shutdown.

On 30–31 July 2025, the BACC was told by BMA officials the gallery could only continue if it removed any reference to Chinese leader Xi Jinping and works by Tibetan artist Tenzin Mingyur Paldron. The gallery subsequently removed works or obscured the names of works by Paldron, Hong Kong artists Clara Cheung and Gum Cheng Yee Man, and Uyghur artist Mukaddas Mijit.

On 6 August 2025, an additional visit by Chinese Embassy officials reminded the gallery to comply with the One China Policy and requested the removal of an additional flyer from Paldron's installation.

Sai, the gallery's Burmese co-curator, described the removal as, "It is tragically ironic that an exhibition on authoritarian cooperation has been censored under authoritarian pressure. Thailand has long been a refuge for dissidents. This is a chilling signal to all exiled artists and activists in the region." Sai subsequently fled Thailand.

Phil Robertson, deputy director of Human Rights Watch's Asia Division, characterized the move as "Chinese transnational repression - in the form of censorship this time" on Twitter.

A Bangkok Post editorial criticized the BACC, noting that "For the BACC, which has remained tight-lipped over what has occurred, this incident has inarguably hurt its reputation. The centre is expected to stand by the artists and to provide space for artists dedicated to certain values, such as challenging authoritarianism and dictatorship."

== Aims ==
BACC walkway

The BACC aims to create a meeting place for artists and the public, to provide cultural programmes for the community giving importance to cultural continuity from past to present. It aims to blaze new paths for cultural dialogue, networking, and to create new cultural resources from both the public and the private sectors. The main aim of BACC is to become a place for cultural exchange.

== Finances ==
The Bangkok Metropolitan Administration (BMA) under Governor Apirak Kosayodhin started the BACC project with a 509 million baht construction budget in 2005. The goal was to make Bangkok a city of culture. The BMA continues to support the BACC with a 40 million baht allocation yearly (except for the years 2009, 2010, and 2017 when the BMA failed to assign funds to the BACC). Forty million baht falls far short of BACC's operating budget, which ranges from 75 million baht to 90 million a year. The shortfall is raised from donors and corporate sponsors. In 2018, the ongoing 40 million baht expenditure displeases Bangkok Governor Police General Aswin Kwanmuang, who says, "Each year the city supports the BACC with 40 million baht. If we could manage this money ourselves, we could develop the center in appropriate ways." He want on to say, "As the BMA annually provides Bt40 million in funding to the foundation, it is better that BMA officials operate the city centre,...We will lease the ground floor area in order to earn more money so as to cut the losses. We will convert the exhibition floors into a new learning centre." Aswin was installed as Bangkok governor by the NCPO after his elected predecessor was tainted by a corruption scandal. Apparent moves by the Bangkok governor to take control of the BACC for financial reasons has drawn criticism. Some question the ability of the BMA to manage a cultural venue given its poor performance maintaining Bangkok infrastructure. Many believe the BMA want to make a profit from the space. The BACC is in one of the Bangkok's prime shopping areas, near the MBK Center and Siam Square shopping complexes.

After protests from the art and cultural community, the governor deferred any changes to BACC's governance structure until 2021 when the current BMA–BACC Foundation contract expires.

== Architecture ==
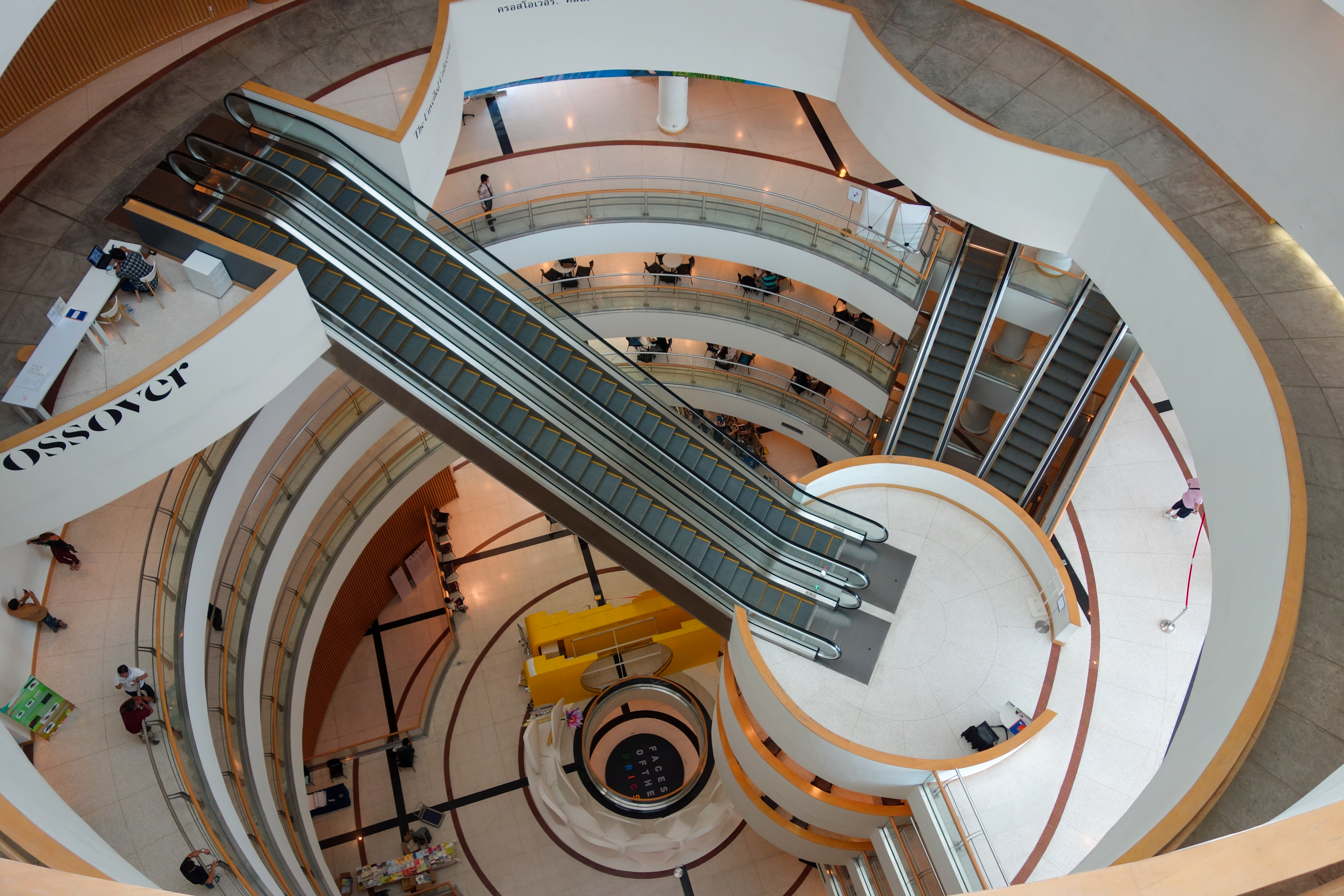
The central atrium

The BACC building was designed by Robert G. Boughey and Associates around four criteria:

1. Flexible space
2. Honor Thai architecture and culture
3. High, airy spaces
4. Natural but controlled lighting

Multi-Function Room is on the 1st floor for supporting various of activities for instance banquet, press conference, meeting etc. Multi-Function Room have a capacity for 250-300 people and the room's size is 280 square metres (3,000 sq ft). The building was built to have high spaces to accommodate the art, and the central atrium serves as a symbol of the building and sets the tone for the rest of the interior.

== Working Hours ==
Bangkok Art and Culture Centre closed on Monday and opened from 10.00 a.m. to 9.00 p.m. on Tuesday to Sunday. There is no admission charge.

== See also ==
- Tourism in Thailand
