= Consulate-General of China, Chiang Mai =

Consulate-General of China, Chiang Mai 中华人民共和国驻清迈总领事馆
- Consul General: Chen Haiping

The Consulate-General of the People's Republic of China in Chiang Mai (Chinese: 中华人民共和国驻清迈总领事馆) is the diplomatic mission of China to Chiang Mai and Northern Thailand. The current consul-general is Chen Haiping.

== History ==
On 6 July 2026, a protest was held outside the Consulate over alleged toxic metal contamination in Thailand by Chinese mining companies. Demonstrators clashed with police forces, leading to two injured protesters.

Law enforcement action at the Consulate protest was subsequently condemned in a 8 July 2026 protest at the Chinese Embassy in Bangkok, organized by the NGO Coordinating Committee on Development (NGO-COD) and civil society groups.

In response to the protests at the Consulate-General and Embassy, the Embassy later released a statement on Facebook calling for a joint Thailand-Myanmar probe into heavy metal contamination in the Mekong River tributaries.
