= Consulate General of the United States, Chiang Mai =

Consulate General of the United States, Chiang Mai สถานกงสุลใหญ่สหรัฐฯ เชียงใหม่
- Location: Chiang Mai, Thailand
- Opened: 1950
- Consul General: Lisa A. Buzenas

The Consulate General of the United States, Chiang Mai (Thai: สถานกงสุลใหญ่สหรัฐฯ เชียงใหม่) represents the interests of the United States government in Chiang Mai, Thailand. The consulate reports to the ambassador at the U.S. Embassy in Bangkok. Lisa A. Buzenas is the current Consul General in Chiang Mai.

Opened in 1950, the consulate oversees relations with 15 provinces in Northern Thailand. In 2020, the United States broke ground on a $284 million new building for the consulate on the city's superhighway. The expansion, designed by Ennead Architects, is expected to open in 2024.
