= Khaosod =

Thai daily newspaper

- Type: Daily Newspaper
- Format: Print, online
- Owner: Matichon Publishing Group
- Founded: 9 April 1991
- Political alignment: Center-left, Liberalism
- Language: Thai
- Website: www.khaosod.co.th

Khaosod (Thai: ข่าวสด, RTGS: Khao Sot, pronounced [kʰàːw sòt]; literally meaning 'fresh news' or 'live news') is a Thai daily newspaper with national circulation. Its online version is Khaosod Online. Khaosod is the youngest paper of the Matichon Publishing Group which also operates two other daily news publications, Matichon and Prachachat.

== Description ==
Khaosod is more mass-oriented and upcountry-focused in style than its sister newspapers in the Matichon Group. Its circulation records show 950,000 copies sold per day. Despite heavy features on crimes, local affairs, and entertainment like other major national newspapers (such as Thairath and Daily News), the newspaper also remains keen on political and social issues similar to its sister newspapers Matichon and Prachachat. Khaosod is managed by Kanchai Boonparn, who also oversees the Matichon Group as a whole.

Khaosod is currently the third-bestselling newspaper in Thailand. Additionally, the online edition of the newspaper experienced a 98 percent rise in number of visits in 2010.

Khaosod first came to prominence in 1994 for its extensive coverage of the cover up murders of a Thai gem dealer's wife and her son. Details later emerged, partially due to Khaosod's reporting, that Lieutenant-General Chalor Kerdthes of the Royal Thai Police ordered the pair abducted and subsequently murdered after failing to extract information concerning the fate of the Saudi Blue Diamond from the pair. Initially reported by many newspapers as a roadside accident, Khaosod insisted otherwise from early on. Lieutenant-General Chalor and several other police officers were arrested, found guilty, and sentenced to death (the sentences were later reduced to 50 years of imprisonment). Khaosod was awarded Best News Feature from the Isra Amanantakul Foundation in that year for its coverage of the incident.

== Khaosod English ==
Khaosod English is a news website operating as Khaosod's English-language arm. It was launched on 9 April 2013, and is known for its liberal standpoint and its criticism of the 2014 military government; the Union of Catholic Asian News has described it as "a beacon of independent journalism in Thailand". Its most prominent staff writer is Pravit Rojanaphruk, who publishes a weekly column and is an outspoken critic on regional conflicts such as the 2025 Cambodian–Thai border crisis and 2026 Iran war. Khaosod English has a more focused target group than its parent, and has about 475,000 followers on facebook. The site republishes reports from the Associated Press and Kyodo News.

In August 2019, the site was criticized in Foreign Policy for a deal (made together with its parent) to republish content from the Chinese state-run news agency Xinhua.
