= Embassy of China, Bangkok =

Embassy of China, Bangkok 中华人民共和国驻泰王国大使馆
- Address: 57 Ratchadaphisek Rd, Din Daeng, Bangkok 10400, Thailand
- Ambassador: Zhang Jianwei

The Embassy of the People's Republic of China in the Kingdom of Thailand (Chinese: 中华人民共和国驻泰王国大使馆, Thai: สถานเอกอัครราชทูตสาธารณรัฐประชาชนจีนประจำราชอาณาจักรไทย) is the official diplomatic mission of the People's Republic of China to the Kingdom of Thailand, located in Bangkok. The Embassy is located on Ratchadaphisek Road in Din Daeng district.

The current ambassador is Zhang Jianwei, who took office in July 2025.

== History ==
Following the disappearance of Chinese actor Wang Xing in January 2025, the Embassy assisted with the search efforts.

Thailand and China celebrated 50 years of diplomatic relations in 2025 with a series of events hosted by the Embassy across Bangkok.

Following the deportation of 40 Uyghur asylum seekers held in Thailand to China in February 2025, the Embassy confirmed the deportation.

=== 2025 censorship of artwork critical of China ===
On 27 July 2025, embassy staff members visited the "Constellation of Complicity: Visualising the Global Machinery of Authoritarian Solidarity” at the Bangkok Arts and Culture Centre (BACC) and demanded the removal of materials critical of China.

The gallery later removed the materials, and in an 30 July 2025 email explained "Due to pressure from the Chinese Embassy - transmitted through the Ministry of Foreign Affairs and particularly the Bangkok Metropolitan Administration, our main supporter - we have been warned that the exhibition may risk creating diplomatic tensions between Thailand and China."

=== 2026 protest ===
On 8 July 2026, a group of activists organized by NGO Coordinating Committee (NGO-COD) and civil society groups protested outside the Embassy, urging China to address cross-border pollution, and calling for an investigation into the use of police during a previous protest at the Consulate of China in Chiang Mai.

In a statement issued by NGO-COD on 8 July 2026, the protest was to "draw attention to transboundary pollution affecting the Kok, Sai, Ruak and Mekong rivers in Chiang Mai and Chiang Rai provinces," along with calling on the Thai government to immediately halt the use of force against peaceful protestors. The Embassy also reached out to several Thai news outlets, including Thai public broadcaster Thai PBS, to censor photos of the protests.

On 20 July 2026, members of the opposition People's Party, including People’s Party leader and party-list MP Natthaphong Ruengpanyawut, accompanied by Chiang Mai MP Pattharapong Leelaphat met with Embassy officials to present evidence of the pollution.

=== 2026 attempted censorship of Blood Copper documentary ===
In July 2026, Pravit Rojanaphruk wrote in Khaosod that a source confirmed that the Embassy of China in Bangkok asked Thailand’s Ministry of Foreign Affairs to stop a showing of Blood Copper held by the Foreign Correspondents' Club of Thailand on 15 June 2026. The Thai government declined to intervene, and the screening was held as scheduled. The documentary used open-source intelligence to document the relationship between the Burmese military and a Chinese state-owned company operating the Letpadaung copper mine in Myanmar.

=== 2026 Taiwan Documentary & Film Festival ===
In July 2026, Khaosod reported on allegations that Chinese Embassy staff in Bangkok attempted to pressure organizers of the eighth edition of the Taiwan Documentary and Film Festival in Thailand to remove the name and logo of Taiwan’s Ministry of Culture from promotional materials for the festival. The festival was jointly organized by the Taipei Economic and Cultural Office in Thailand, the Thailand-based Documentary Club, the New Taipei City Government and the Taiwan Film and Audiovisual Institute. Organizer Thida Philtpolkarnpim rejected the demands.
