= Foreign relations of Thailand =

The foreign relations of Thailand are handled by the Ministry of Foreign Affairs of Thailand.

Thailand participates fully in international and regional organizations. It has developed close ties with other ASEAN members—Indonesia, Malaysia, the Philippines, Singapore, Brunei, Laos, and Vietnam—whose foreign and economic ministers hold annual meetings. Regional cooperation is progressing in economic, trade, banking, political, and cultural matters. In 2003, Thailand served as APEC host. Dr. Supachai Panitchpakdi, the former Deputy Prime Minister of Thailand, served as Secretary-General of the United Nations Conference on Trade and Development (UNCTAD) from 2005 until 31 August 2015. In 2005 Thailand attended the inaugural East Asia Summit.

Since the military coup of May 2014, Thailand's global reputation has plunged, according to Professor Thitinan Pongsudhirak of Chulalongkorn University. He maintains that, "When the fourth anniversary of Thailand's coup comes to pass later this month [May 2018], Thailand's foreign relations will be one of the many costs to be counted from the military government....Instead of moving ahead in its relations with the outside world, Thailand has regressed to a standstill.

== Disputes ==
Parts of the border with Laos are undefined. A maritime boundary dispute with Vietnam was resolved in August 1997. Parts of the maritime border with Cambodia are disputed. Sporadic conflict with Myanmar over alignment of border.

== Diplomatic relations ==
List of countries which Thailand maintains diplomatic relations with:

#	Country	Date
1	United Kingdom	18 April 1855
2	France	15 August 1856
3	Denmark	21 May 1858
4	Portugal	10 February 1859
5	Netherlands	17 December 1860
6	Sweden	18 May 1868
7	Italy	3 October 1868
8	Spain	23 February 1870
9	United States	23 October 1882
10	Belgium	21 July 1883
11	Japan	26 September 1887
12	Russia	3 July 1897
13	Norway	30 November 1905
14	Switzerland	28 May 1931
15	India	1 August 1947
16	Myanmar	24 August 1948
17	Philippines	14 June 1949
18	Indonesia	7 March 1950
19	Cambodia	19 December 1950
20	Laos	19 December 1950
21	Pakistan	10 October 1951
22	Germany	28 May 1952
23	Australia	19 December 1952
24	Afghanistan	23 April 1953
25	Austria	2 July 1953
26	Finland	17 June 1954
27	Israel	23 June 1954
28	Egypt	27 September 1954
29	Serbia	12 November 1954
30	Argentina	2 February 1955
31	Iran	9 November 1955
32	Sri Lanka	20 November 1955
33	Syria	10 January 1956
34	New Zealand	26 March 1956
35	Iraq	24 May 1956
36	Guatemala	7 March 1957
37	Malaysia	31 August 1957
38	Saudi Arabia	1 October 1957
39	Lebanon	3 February 1958
40	Turkey	12 May 1958
41	Cuba	19 May 1958
42	Greece	26 May 1958
43	South Korea	1 October 1958
44	Brazil	17 April 1959
45	Luxembourg	16 June 1959
46	Nepal	30 November 1959
47	Canada	8 November 1961
48	Chile	9 October 1962
49	Nigeria	1 November 1962
50	Paraguay	17 December 1962
51	Bolivia	1 February 1963
52	Kuwait	14 June 1963
53	Ethiopia	10 April 1964
54	Cameroon	20 July 1965
55	Singapore	20 September 1965
56	Peru	10 November 1965
57	Ivory Coast	30 June 1966
58	Jordan	10 November 1966
59	Liberia	2 February 1967
60	Tunisia	2 February 1967
61	Kenya	25 July 1967
62	Dominican Republic	18 September 1969
63	Democratic Republic of the Congo	14 February 1969
—	Holy See	26 April 1969
64	Bangladesh	5 October 1972
65	Poland	14 November 1972
66	Fiji	15 December 1972
67	Romania	1 June 1973
68	Hungary	24 October 1973
69	Costa Rica	14 December 1973
70	Mongolia	5 March 1974
71	Czech Republic	15 March 1974
72	Bulgaria	10 August 1974
73	Ireland	27 January 1975
74	North Korea	8 May 1975
75	Iceland	18 June 1975
76	China	1 July 1975
77	Mexico	28 August 1975
78	Nicaragua	24 November 1975
79	Algeria	6 December 1975
80	United Arab Emirates	12 December 1975
81	Gabon	1 April 1976
82	Papua New Guinea	19 May 1976
83	Uruguay	15 June 1976
84	Vietnam	6 August 1976
85	Mauritania	24 August 1976
86	Bahrain	17 January 1977
87	Libya	16 March 1977
88	Grenada	16 May 1977
89	Samoa	15 November 1978
90	Colombia	20 January 1979
91	Mauritius	22 January 1979
92	Maldives	21 June 1979
93	Ecuador	15 January 1980
94	Cyprus	5 May 1980
95	Oman	30 July 1980
96	Qatar	7 August 1980
97	Senegal	9 August 1980
98	Benin	5 October 1980
99	Tanzania	30 December 1980
100	Mali	15 September 1981
101	Sudan	15 June 1982
102	Niger	30 July 1982
103	Panama	20 August 1982
104	Venezuela	27 August 1982
105	Vanuatu	21 September 1982
106	Albania	30 September 1982
107	Sierra Leone	24 December 1982
108	Yemen	5 April 1983
109	Guinea	15 April 1983
110	Guinea-Bissau	6 December 1983
111	Brunei	1 January 1984
—	Sovereign Military Order of Malta	4 September 1984
112	Jamaica	10 September 1984
113	Somalia	1 November 1984
114	Malta	17 December 1984
115	Gambia	15 February 1985
116	Uganda	15 February 1985
117	Zimbabwe	4 April 1985
118	Burkina Faso	12 July 1985
119	Morocco	4 October 1985
120	Ghana	25 October 1985
121	Botswana	29 November 1985
122	Honduras	16 December 1985
123	Trinidad and Tobago	22 January 1986
124	Djibouti	1 April 1986
125	Solomon Islands	2 May 1986
126	Togo	7 May 1986
127	Comoros	15 July 1986
128	Haiti	30 October 1986
129	Cape Verde	2 December 1986
130	Saint Vincent and the Grenadines	9 December 1986
131	Saint Kitts and Nevis	16 January 1987
132	Suriname	24 February 1987
133	São Tomé and Príncipe	7 May 1987
134	Malawi	1 June 1987
135	El Salvador	24 September 1987
136	Central African Republic	30 October 1987
137	Rwanda	30 October 1987
138	Zambia	9 November 1987
139	Guyana	17 December 1987
140	Seychelles	19 July 1988
141	Burundi	20 July 1988
142	Republic of the Congo	25 August 1988
143	Barbados	22 November 1988
144	Saint Lucia	4 April 1989
145	Lesotho	17 April 1989
146	Mozambique	19 April 1989
147	Bhutan	14 November 1989
148	Chad	28 September 1990
149	Namibia	6 November 1990
150	Madagascar	30 November 1990
151	Eswatini	17 January 1991
152	Equatorial Guinea	15 February 1991
153	Latvia	19 March 1992
154	Federated States of Micronesia	20 March 1992
155	Estonia	27 April 1992
156	Ukraine	6 May 1992
157	Uzbekistan	6 May 1992
158	Kazakhstan	6 July 1992
159	Turkmenistan	6 July 1992
160	Armenia	7 July 1992
161	Azerbaijan	7 July 1992
162	Belarus	21 July 1992
163	Georgia	21 July 1992
164	Moldova	5 August 1992
165	Tajikistan	5 August 1992
166	Kyrgyzstan	6 August 1992
167	Angola	24 August 1992
168	Croatia	9 September 1992
169	Slovenia	9 September 1992
170	Slovakia	1 January 1993
171	Lithuania	9 April 1993
172	Marshall Islands	29 October 1993
173	Eritrea	7 December 1993
174	South Africa	9 December 1993
175	Tonga	27 January 1994
176	Palau	13 May 1997
177	Liechtenstein	14 August 1997
178	Belize	11 June 1999
179	Bosnia and Herzegovina	14 February 2000
180	Andorra	28 April 2000
181	Timor-Leste	20 May 2002
182	San Marino	12 September 2003
183	Nauru	14 January 2005
184	North Macedonia	25 February 2005
—	Cook Islands	24 May 2005
185	Kiribati	29 June 2005
186	Tuvalu	29 August 2005
187	Dominica	25 November 2005
188	Monaco	26 June 2006
189	Antigua and Barbuda	7 July 2006
190	Montenegro	6 June 2007
—	State of Palestine	1 August 2012
—	Niue	27 August 2013
—	Kosovo	22 November 2013
191	South Sudan	5 December 2013
192	Bahamas	21 September 2016

== Asia ==
=== ASEAN ===
Country	Formal relations began	Notes
Brunei	1 January 1984	See Brunei–Thailand relations: Brunei has an embassy in Bangkok, and Thailand has an embassy in Bandar Seri Begawan. The relations have always been close and cordial.; Both countries are also members of the Non-Aligned Movement and the Asia-Pacific Economic Cooperation.
Cambodia	19 December 1950	See Cambodia–Thailand relations: Parts of Cambodia's border with Thailand are indefinite, and the maritime boundary with Thailand is not clearly defined. On 5 November 2009 Thailand recalled its ambassador from Cambodia in protest of the Cambodian government's appointment of Thai ex-leader Thaksin Shinawatra as an economic advisor. Thai Prime Minister Abhisit Vejjajiva stated that this was "the first diplomatic retaliation measure" against the appointment. He also said that Cambodia was interfering in Thai internal affairs and as a result bi-lateral co-operation agreements would be reviewed. The Cambodian government has stated that it would refuse any extradition request from Thailand for Thaksin as it considered him to be a victim of political persecution.; In the months leading up to the Cambodian decision, troops from both nations had clashed over territory claimed by both countries immediately adjacent to Preah Vihear, an 11th-century Hindu temple, leading to a deterioration in relations. At 20:30 on 5 November Cambodia announced that it was withdrawing its ambassador from Thailand as a retaliatory measure. Sok An, a member of the Council of Ministers and Deputy Prime Minister of Cambodia, said that the appointment of Thaksin is a decision internal to Cambodia and that it "conforms to international practice". The mutual withdrawal of ambassadors is the most severe diplomatic action to have occurred between the two countries.; Thailand has an embassy in Phnom Penh, while Cambodia has an embassy in Bangkok.
Indonesia	7 March 1950	See Indonesia–Thailand relations: Indonesia and Thailand are viewed as natural allies.; Indonesia is Thailand's third most important trade partner within ASEAN, with bilateral trade worth $8.7 billion in 2007. Trade between the two countries is set to grow over the years.; Following the military takeover of the government in Thailand in May 2014, Indonesia supports the restoration of democracy in Thailand. Indonesia urged the military and civilian elements in Thailand to work together to quickly restore the political situation in Thailand.; Thailand has an embassy in Jakarta and honorary consulates in Denpasar, Medan and Surabaya.; Indonesia has an embassy in Bangkok and a consulate in Songkhla.; Both countries are also members of the Asia-Pacific Economic Cooperation, Non-Aligned Movement, Cairns Group, Indian-Ocean Rim Association and G20 developing nations.
Laos	19 December 1950	See Laos–Thailand relations: In some respects, Thailand can be seen as a greater threat to Laos's independence than Vietnam because of its closer cultural affinity, its easier access, and its control over the railroad and highway routes to the sea. The Mekong River, which both sides have an interest in making a "river of true peace and friendship" — as their respective prime ministers called for in 1976 – also provides a north–south artery during the rainy season.; Thailand has an embassy in Vientiane and a consulate-general in Savannakhet.; Laos has an embassy in Bangkok and a consulate-general in Khon Kaen.
Malaysia	31 August 1957	See Malaysia–Thailand relations: Thailand has an embassy in Kuala Lumpur, and consulate-general offices in George Town and Kota Bharu. Malaysia maintains an embassy in Bangkok. Recently, Thai-Malay relations have soured considerably due to the ethnically Malay Pattani separatists in three southern provinces of Thailand. There have been claims by some Thai politicians that certain parties in Malaysia has taken an interest in the cause of their opponents in the war, which is vehemently disputed by the latter.; Both countries also members of the Asia-Pacific Economic Cooperation, Non-Aligned Movement, Cairns Group and Indian-Ocean Rim Association.
Myanmar	24 August 1948	See Myanmar–Thailand relations Myanmar has an embassy in Bangkok and a consulate-general in Chiang Mai. Thailand has an embassy in Yangon.
Philippines	14 June 1949	See Philippines–Thailand relations: Thailand is one of the Philippines' major trading partners and one of the Philippines' rice suppliers. Relations continue to be strengthened through talks and agreements on economic, security, and cultural matters including concerns on rice trading, and combatting drugs and human trafficking.; Thailand has an embassy in Manila and an honorary consulate in Cebu.; The Philippines has an embassy in Bangkok.; Both countries are the only Major non-NATO Allies in Southeast Asia.; Both countries are also members of the Asia-Pacific Economic Cooperation, Non-Aligned Movement, Cairns Group and G20 developing nations together with Indonesia.; A Treaty of Friendship was signed by both countries on June 14, 1949.
Singapore	20 September 1965	See Singapore–Thailand relations: Bilateral relations between the two nations formally date to 1965, when Thailand established diplomatic relations soon after the independence of Singapore.; Both countries share close defence ties, regularly sending personnel for cross training and holding various annual exercises between Singapore Armed Forces and Royal Thai Armed Forces.; Thailand has an embassy in Singapore.; Singapore has an embassy in Bangkok.; Both countries are also members of the Asia-Pacific Economic Cooperation, Non-Aligned Movement and Indian-Ocean Rim Association.
Vietnam	6 August 1976	See Thailand–Vietnam relations: Diplomatic relations between the two countries have existed since 1976, and are very friendly both economically and politically nowadays. Yet, relations between the two countries had always been marred by discord, which resulted from bitter rivalry to gain control of the area of what is today Laos and Cambodia.; In the 19th century, Thailand (then known as Siam) had fought a series of wars with the Nguyễn dynasty which then ruled over Vietnam over control of Cambodia. This rivalry will only temporarily subside when French colonists stepped in and gradually building an establishment in Southeast Asia, known as French Indochina.; During the Vietnam War, Thailand was aligned with South Vietnam and the United States and the U Tapao Air Base was used as a base for USAF aircraft. During the Fall of Saigon in 1975, fleeing South Vietnamese pilots arrived at U Tapao before fleeing to other countries.; In 1979, when the Khmer Rouge government in neighbouring Cambodia was toppled, this had raised concerns in Thailand and the Thai government quickly allied itself with the Khmer Rouge, later the CGDK, in fear of Vietnamese expansionism. In fact, Thailand was foremost among the ASEAN, of which it is part of, in opposing the Vietnamese invasion of Cambodia.; Cambodian refugees soon stayed at border camps straddling the Thai-Cambodian border, and these camps are often controlled by the Khmer Rouge or the CGDK. In the years that followed, Vietnam launched a series of raids on the camps and Vietnamese troops often penetrated into Thai territory and shelled Thai border villages and towns.; Thailand has an embassy in Hanoi and a consulate-general in Ho Chi Minh City.; Vietnam has an embassy in Bangkok and a consulate-general in Khon Kaen.; Both countries are also members of the Asia-Pacific Economic Cooperation and Non-Aligned Movement.

=== Rest of Asia ===
Country	Formal Relations Began	Notes
Bahrain	17 January 1977	Historically, Bahrain and Thailand shared mutual common of historical civilizations developed in both countries.; Since the 1990s, Thailand and Bahrain signed a major framework on economic cooperation, thus effectively making them important economic partners. Today, Thailand is a major investor in Bahrain.; In March 2019, Bahraini Prime Minister and Prince Khalifa bin Salman Al Khalifa, during his participation in the Thai Culture and Food Festival held in capital Manama, praised Thailand and expressed wish to promote the relations.; Thailand has an embassy in Manama.; Bahrain has an embassy in Bangkok.
Bangladesh	5 October 1972	See Bangladesh–Thailand relations: Relations are considered close and cordial and have made strides to improve trade and investment between the two countries. Diplomatic relations were established on 5 October 1972 and Thailand opened its embassy in 1974 followed by Bangladesh setting up their own in Bangkok in the following year. The first visit between the two countries was President Ziaur Rahman's visit to Thailand in 1979 followed by Prime Minister Prem Tinsulanonda in 1983. Other Heads of States like Ershad visited in 1985, 1988 and 1990 and Thaksin Shinawatra in July and December 2002 and January 2004. Thailand is a key country in Bangladesh's "Look East" policy and relations have begun to increase and diversify into different areas.; They seek not to intervene in each other's internal matters as shown by their response to the events occurring in their own respective countries in 2006 such as the 2006 Thai coup d'état and 2006–2008 Bangladeshi political crisis. Both have considerable cooperation in summits organised by BIMSTEC and the ASEAN regional forum. Upper class and upper middle class Bangladeshis often go to Thailand for medical treatment and operations that the country's medical infrastructure cannot provide.
Bhutan	14 November 1989	See Bhutan–Thailand relations: Diplomatic relations between both countries have grown stronger over the years.; Bhutan and Thailand also promote cooperation in the field of education.; Bhutan has an embassy in Bangkok.
China	1 July 1975	See China–Thailand relations: Thailand established diplomatic relations with the PRC on 1 July 1975. It remains as a key regional ally of China, with growing cooperation between both countries.; For an evaluation of Sino-Siamese relations, see Siamese Inter-State Relations in the Late Nineteenth Century: From An Asian Regional Perspective.
Hong Kong (Special Administrative Region of China)		See Hong Kong–Thailand relations: Thailand has a consulate-general in Hong Kong.; Hong Kong has an Economic and Trade Office in Bangkok.; On 27 April 2017, Hong Kong Chief Executive CY Leung met Thai Deputy Prime Minister Somkid Jatusripitak at Government House, Hong Kong. They exchanged views on Hong Kong's free trade agreement negotiations with the Association of Southeast Asian Nations.
India	1 August 1947	See India–Thailand relations: Diplomatic relations between India and Thailand were established in 1947, soon after India gained independence. Thailand maintains three diplomatic posts in India: in Mumbai, in New Delhi, and in Calcutta. India maintains an embassy in Bangkok and a consulate-general in Chiang Mai.; The end of the Cold War led to a significant enhancement in the substance and pace of bilateral interactions. Indian Look East policy from 1993 and Thailand's Look West policy since 1996 set the stage for a substantive consolidation of bilateral relations. The past few years since 2001 have witnessed growing warmth, increasing economic and commercial links, exchange of high-level visits on both sides, and the signing of a large number of Agreements leading to a further intensification of relations. Thailand and India are cooperating in various multilateral fora like India's dialogue partnership with ASEAN, the ASEAN Regional Forum (ARF), and the East Asia Summit, the sub-regional grouping BIMSTEC involving Bangladesh, India, Sri Lanka, Thailand, Myanmar, Nepal and Bhutan, and trilateral transport linkages with Thailand, Myanmar and India. India is a member of the Asia Cooperation Dialogue (ACD) initiated by Thailand in 2002 and of the Mekong–Ganga Cooperation (MGC), a group of six countries.
Iran	9 November 1955	See Iran–Thailand relations: Relations between the two countries began when visits of Persian diplomatic delegations to Siam are attested as early as 1685. Indo-Persians made up the largest group of Muslims from the 16th to 18th centuries. Influential Persian families like the Bunnag dominated Thai courts for some time.; Iran has an embassy in Bangkok.; Thailand has an embassy in Tehran.
Israel	23 June 1954	See Israel–Thailand relations Israel and Thailand have had official relations since June 1954. The Israeli embassy in Bangkok was established in 1958. Since 1996, Thailand has had an embassy in Tel Aviv. After the floods in 2011, Israel sent water management experts to Thailand. Princess Chulabhorn Mahidol is involved in advancing scientific cooperation between the two countries. The Thai ambassador to Israel is Jukr Boon-Long.
Japan	26 September 1887	See Japan–Thailand relations Abhisit with Japanese Prime Minister Yukio Hatoyama, 8 November 2009, Tokyo: Japan has become a key trading partner and foreign investor for Thailand. Japan is Thailand's largest supplier, followed by the United States. Since 2005, the rapid ramp-up in export of automobiles of Japanese makes (esp. Toyota, Nissan, Isuzu) has helped to dramatically improve the trade balance, with over 1 million cars produced last year. As such, Thailand has joined the ranks of the world's top ten automobile exporting nations. In 2007, a Japan–Thailand Economic Partnership Agreement was signed, aiming at free trade between the two countries after a transition period of 10 years.; Thailand has an embassy in Tokyo and consulates-general in Osaka and Fukuoka.; Japan has an embassy in Bangkok and a consulate-general in Chiang Mai.
North Korea	8 May 1975	See North Korea–Thailand relations: Thailand is represented by North Korea by its embassy in Beijing, China.; North Korea has an embassy in Bangkok.; See also: North Korean defectors in Thailand
South Korea	1 October 1958	See South Korea–Thailand relations: Both countries established diplomatic relations on 1 October 1958. The year 2008 is the 50th year of bilateral relations with two nations. During the Korean War, Thailand was the second nation sending troops for supporting South Korea just after the United States. In October 2003, South Korea president Roh Moo-hyun visited Thailand while Prime Minister Thaksin Shinawatra went to Seoul in November 2005. South Korean is the 10th largest trade partner, which is about to reach the scale of 10 billion dollars.; Thailand has an embassy in Seoul; South Korea has an embassy in Bangkok.
Oman	30 July 1980	See Oman–Thailand relations: Oman and Thailand would soon establish relations with the ascend of Qaboos bin Said al Said as Sultan of Oman in 1980.; Thailand is one of the most popular tourist destinations for Omanis outside the Gulf states, especially medical tourism.; Thailand has an embassy in Muscat.; Oman has an embassy in Bangkok.
Pakistan	10 October 1951	See Pakistan–Thailand relations: In August 2013, the Thai Prime Minister Yingluck Shinawatra visited Pakistan in the first visit in a decade.; Thailand has an embassy in Islamabad and a consulate-general in Karachi.; Pakistan has an embassy in Bangkok.; Both countries are members of the Non-Aligned Movement and the Cairns Group.
Palestine	1 August 2012	See Palestine–Thailand relations: Thailand officially recognized the State of Palestine as an independent state on 18 January 2012.; Palestine has a non-resident embassy in Kuala Lumpur.; In 2016, Palestinian President Mahmoud Abbas visited Thailand and met with then Prime Minister Prayut Chan-o-cha.
Qatar	7 August 1980	See Qatar–Thailand relations: Both countries established diplomatic relations in 1980. Their cooperation mainly revolves around tourism and energy.; According to the Thailand Labour Ministry, in 2017 there were 1,188 Thai citizens working in Qatar, and were mainly concentrated in the massage services industry and the construction industry.; Thailand has an embassy in Doha.; Qatar has an embassy in Bangkok.
Saudi Arabia	1 October 1957	See Saudi Arabia–Thailand relations: Relations Saudi Arabia and Thailand were established in 1957 and hundreds of thousands of Thais went to Saudi Arabia to work. However, relations have been severely strained for the past 20 years due to fallout from the Blue Diamond Affair. Diplomatic missions were downgraded to chargé d'affaires level and the number of Thai workers in Saudi Arabia plummeted. Saudi Arabia does not issue working visas for Thais and discourages its citizens from visiting the country.; On January 26, 2022, both countries announced they restored full diplomatic relations and would appoint ambassadors.; Thailand has an embassy in Riyadh and a consulate-general in Jeddah.; Saudi Arabia has an embassy in Bangkok.
Taiwan	No formal diplomatic relations	See Taiwan–Thailand relations: Thailand and Taiwan (ROC) do not have diplomatic relations, both have only an unofficial relationship.; Both nations used to have diplomatic relations from 1946 until 1975 when Thailand switched recognition to the People's Republic of China.; Thailand has an Economic and Trade Office in Taipei.; Taiwan has an Economic and Cultural Office in Bangkok.
Turkey	12 May 1958	See Thailand–Turkey relations: Thailand has an embassy in Ankara.; Turkey has an embassy in Bangkok.; Trade volume between the two countries was 1.342 billion USD in 2018 (Thai exports/imports: 1.09/0.256 billion USD).; Negotiations on a bilateral Free Trade Agreement (FTA) began in 2017.; There are direct flights from Istanbul to Bangkok and Phuket.
United Arab Emirates	12 December 1975	See Thailand–United Arab Emirates relations: Both countries established diplomatic relations on 12 December 1975.; Thailand has an embassy in Abu Dhabi and a consulate-general in Dubai.; The United Arab Emirates has an embassy in Bangkok.

== Americas ==
Country	Formal Relations Began	Notes
Belize	11 June 1999	Both countries established diplomatic relations on 11 June 1999.
Brazil	17 April 1959	Further information: Brazil–Thailand relations: Brazil is the main trading partner of Thailand in Latin America.; Brazil has an embassy in Bangkok and an honorary consulate in Phuket.; Thailand has an embassy in Brasília and consulates-general in São Paulo and Rio de Janeiro.
Canada	8 November 1961	Further information: Canada-Thailand relations: Canada has an embassy in Bangkok and a consulate in Chiang Mai.; Thailand has an embassy in Ottawa and consulates-general in Toronto and Vancouver.
Colombia	20 April 1979	Colombia has its embassy in Bangkok.; Thailand is represented through its embassy in Lima, Peru
Mexico	28 August 1975	Main article: Mexico–Thailand relations: Mexico has an embassy in Bangkok and an honorary consulate in Rayong .; Thailand has an embassy in Mexico City.
Peru	10 November 1965	Main article: Peru–Thailand relations In 2009, Thailand and Peru signed a free trade agreement calling for elimination of tariffs on 70% of 5,000 items listed in the agreement. Thailand imports tin and fish from Peru. Peru imports auto parts, electrical appliances, and clothes from Thailand.: Peru has an embassy in Bangkok and honorary consulates in Chiang Mai, Khon Kaen, and Songkhla.; Thailand has an embassy in Lima.
United States	20 March 1833	Main article: Thailand–United States relations Pimpen Vejjajiva, Michelle Obama, Prime Minister Abhisit Vejjajiva and U.S. President Barack Obama on 23 September 2009, in New York Thailand has had relations with the United States since 1833. In 2003, the United States designated Thailand as a major non-NATO ally, which grants Thailand many financial and military benefits derived from the United States.: Thailand has an embassy in Washington, DC and consulates-general in Chicago, Los Angeles and New York City.; United States has an embassy in Bangkok and a consulate-general in Chiang Mai.

== Europe ==
Country	Formal Relations Began	Notes
Armenia	7 July 1992	Both countries established diplomatic relations on 7 July 1992 by protocol.; Armenia has an honorary consulate in Bangkok.; Thailand is represented in Armenia through its embassy in Moscow, Russia and through hononary consulate in Yerevan.
Austria		Austria has an embassy in Bangkok.; Thailand has an embassy in Vienna.
Azerbaijan	7 July 1992	Both countries established diplomatic relations on 7 July 1992.; Azerbaijan has an embassy in Bangkok. Thailand uses its embassy in Ankara, Turkey, to be responsible for Thai-Azerbaijani relations.; Thailand has an honorary consulate in Baku.
Bulgaria	10 August 1974	Since 1975, Bulgaria has an embassy in Bangkok.; Thailand has an honorary consulate in Sofia.
Croatia	9 September 1992	Croatia is represented in Thailand through its embassy in Jakarta (Indonesia) and through an honorary consulate in Bangkok.; Thailand is represented in Croatia through its embassy in Budapest (Hungary) and through an honorary consulate in Zagreb.
Cyprus	5 May 1980	Cyprus is represented in Thailand through its embassy in New Delhi, India.; Thailand is represented in Cyprus through its embassy in Rome, Italy.
Denmark	21 May 1858	See Denmark–Thailand relations: Denmark is represented in Thailand through its embassy in Bangkok and an honorary consulate in Phuket.; Thailand is represented in Denmark through its embassy in Copenhagen.
Estonia	22 October 1921	See Foreign relations of Estonia: Thailand (then Siam) first recognised Estonia on 22 October 1921.; Both countries re-established diplomatic relations on 27 April 1992.; Estonia is represented in Thailand through its consulates in Bangkok and Phuket.; Thailand is represented in Estonia through its embassy in Helsinki, Finland.
Finland		Royal Thai Embassy in Helsinki flying the Asean flag as well as own national flag.: Finland has an embassy in Bangkok.; Thailand has an embassy in Helsinki.
France	15 August 1856	See France–Thailand relations: France-Thailand relations cover a period from the 16th century until modern times.; France is represented in Thailand through its embassy in Bangkok and honorary consuls in Chiang Rai, Khon Kaen, Phuket, Prachuap Khiri Khan, and Surat Thani; Thailand is represented in France through its embassy in Paris.
Germany	7 February 1862	See Germany–Thailand relations Flags of Thailand, Germany and Bavaria for the visit of prime minister Yingluck Shinawatra in Munich 2012: Diplomatic relations between the Kingdom of Siam and Prussia were established on 7 February 1862.; The Siamese government declared war on Germany in August 1917.; During World War II, the Thai government was in alliance with the German and Japanese governments.; Germany has an embassy in Bangkok and honorary consuls in Chiang Mai, Pattaya, and Phuket; Thailand has an embassy in Berlin, a consulate-general in Frankfurt and Munich and honorary consuls in Essen, Hamburg and Stuttgart
Greece	26 May 1958	The Greek Embassy in Bangkok was opened in November 1989, and an honorary consulate in Chiang Mai.; Thailand has an embassy in Athens.
Hungary	24 October 1973	Since 1978, Hungary has an embassy in Bangkok and an honorary consulate in Pattaya.; Since 1989, Thailand has an embassy in Budapest. Thailand has also a commercial office in Budapest.
Kosovo	22 November 2013	See Kosovo–Thailand relations: Thailand recognised the Republic of Kosovo as independence state on 24 September 2013.; Both countries established diplomatic relations on 22 November 2013.; Kosovo has an embassy in Bangkok.
Netherlands	1604	See Netherlands–Thailand relations: 1608 embassy to the Dutch Republic resulted in a treaty being concluded between the Republic and the kingdom of Siam in 1617.; The Netherlands has an embassy in Bangkok and an honorary consulate in Phuket.; Thailand has an embassy in The Hague.
Poland		Poland has an embassy in Bangkok.; Thailand has an embassy in Warsaw.
Portugal	10 February 1859	See Portugal-Thailand relations: Portugal was the first European nation to make contact with the Ayutthaya Kingdom, in 1511.; Portugal has an embassy in Bangkok and an honorary consulate in Chiang Mai.; Thailand has an embassy in Lisbon.
Romania	1 June 1973	Romania has an embassy in Bangkok and an honorary consulate in Pattaya.; Thailand has an embassy in Bucharest.
Russia		See Thailand-Russia relations President Putin with former Prime Minister Thaksin Shinawatra before the start of the APEC Summit in 2003 The Soviet Union and Thailand established diplomatic relations with each other on 12 March 1941; Thailand recognised Russian Federation as the successor to Soviet Union on 28 December 1991. Russia has an embassy in Bangkok and two honorary consulates in Phuket and Pattaya. Thailand has an embassy in Moscow and two honorary consulates in Saint Petersburg and Vladivostok.
Spain	23 February 1870	See Spain-Thailand relations: Spain has an embassy in Bangkok.; Thailand has an embassy in Madrid and an honorary consulate in Barcelona.
Sweden	18 May 1868	Flags of Sweden and Thailand: In 1868 an agreement on eternal friendship between Sweden and Thailand was signed.; In 1883 formalised diplomatic relations were established.; Sweden has an embassy in Bangkok and honorary consulates in Chiang Mai, Pattaya, Phetchaburi, and Phuket.; Thailand has an embassy in Stockholm.
Ukraine	6 May 1992	See Thailand–Ukraine relations: Thailand is represented in Ukraine through its consulate in Kyiv.; Ukraine has an embassy in Bangkok and an honorary consulate in Pattaya.
United Kingdom	18 April 1855	See Thailand–United Kingdom relations: Thailand is represented in the United Kingdom through the Royal Thai Embassy in London (สถานเอกอัครราชทูตไทย ณ กรุงลอนดอน).; British interests in Thailand are represented through the British Embassy on Witthayu Road, Lumphini, Pathum Wan in Bangkok and honorary consulates in Chiang Mai, Pattaya, Phuket, and Surat Thani; British relations with Thailand date back to 1612, when the East India Company ship The Globe arrived in Siam carrying a letter from King James I for the Siamese king.; After Burma lost the First Anglo-Burmese War (1824–26) relations opened between the Rattanakosin Kingdom of Siam and the United Kingdom with a treaty of alliance in February 1826 and another treaty in June negotiated by East India Company emissary Henry Burney. This was followed by the Bowring Treaty of 1855 to liberalise trade. In 1893, Lord Lansdowne of the British Raj finalized the border between Burma and Siam; the Anglo-Siamese Treaty of 1909 then dissected the northern Malay states.: In 1917 the modern Siamese kingdom declared war on Germany during World War I, which secured it a seat at the Versailles Peace Conference. Foreign Minister Devawongse Varopakarn used this as an opportunity to argue for the repeal of the 19th century treaties and restoration of full Siamese sovereignty. While Britain and France delayed until 1925, the United States obliged in 1920. Following the outbreak of World War II, relations with Britain, France and the United States deteriorated rapidly – though former Queen Rambai Barni was nominal head of the Seri Thai resistance movement in Great Britain. Japan allowed Thailand to resume sovereignty over the sultanates of northern Malaya that had been lost in the 1909 treaty with Britain, and to invade and annex the Shan States in northern Burma. After the Japanese surrender, Allied military responsibility for Thailand fell to the British, who favoured treating the kingdom as a defeated enemy. Americans, however, supported Thailand's new government; during the Cold War relations with the United Kingdom took a back seat to those with the United States.

== Oceania ==
Country	Formal Relations Began	Notes
Australia		Main article: Australia–Thailand relations: Australia has an embassy in Bangkok.; Thailand has an embassy in Canberra and a consulate-general in Sydney.; Thailand-Australia Free Trade Agreement
New Zealand		New Zealand has an embassy in Bangkok.; Thailand has an embassy in Wellington.

== See also ==
- List of ambassadors of Thailand to Chile
- List of ambassadors of Thailand to Mexico
- List of diplomatic missions in Thailand
- List of diplomatic missions of Thailand
- 2025 Cambodia–Thailand border conflict
