= Taiwan–Thailand relations =

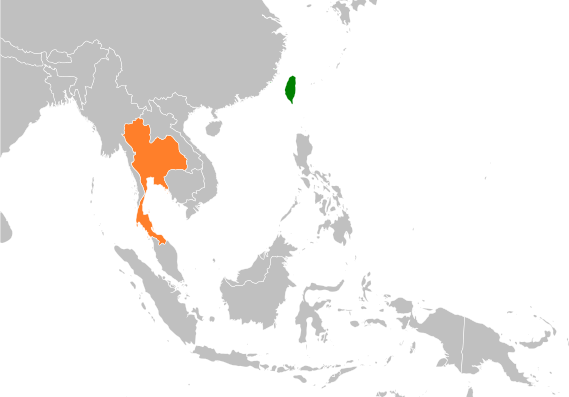
- Taiwan: Thailand

Diplomatic mission
- Taipei Economic and Cultural Office in Thailand: Thailand Trade and Economic Office

Taiwan (formally the Republic of China) and Thailand (formally the Kingdom of Thailand) used to have diplomatic relations from 1946 until 1 July 1975 when Thailand recognized and established diplomatic relations with the People's Republic of China. Despite the shift in recognition, Thailand maintains informal relations with Taiwan.

== History ==
From 5 to 8 June 1963, late Thai King Bhumibol Adulyadej and his wife, Sirikit, made a state visit to Taipei and met then Taiwanese President Chiang Kai-shek.

In 1969, Minister of National Defense Chiang Ching-kuo visited Bangkok as a special envoy of the government of the Republic of China to meet with Thai King.

On 25 October 1971, Thailand abstained from voting on United Nations General Assembly Resolution 2758 recognizing the People's Republic of China as "China's only legitimate representative in the United Nations" in place of the Republic of China.

On 1 July 1975, Thailand announced recognition of the People's Republic of China over the Republic of China.

In 1994, Taiwanese leader Lee Teng-hui made a private visit to Thailand and met with Thai King to discuss projects on economic cooperation.

== Trade ==
By 2022, Taiwan became Thailand's eleventh largest trading partner, making up 2.8% of Thailand's global trade amount. Taiwan became the fourth largest overseas direct investment in Thailand as it invested 44 approved projects, with a total investment of 1.3 billion US dollars.

On 28 June 2024, Taiwan and Thailand signed an investment pact aimed at boosting commercial ties.

== See also ==
- China–Thailand relations
- Milk Tea Alliance
- Thai Chinese
