= Brazil–Thailand relations =

- Brazil: Thailand

Brazil and Thailand began diplomatic relations in 1959. Brazil is Thailand's main trading partner in Latin America. The two nations are members of the G20 developing nations, Non-Aligned Movement, World Trade Organization (WTO) and Forum of East Asia-Latin America Cooperation.

== History ==
On 17 April 1959, Brazil and Thailand formally established diplomatic ties. That same year, correspondence was exchanged between Thai Foreign Minister Thanat Khomann and Brazilian Ambassador Hugo Gouthier. In that same year, the Brazilian embassy in Bangkok opened. In 1964, Thailand's embassy in Brasília was established. The two nations have had friendly relations and seen the rise and extension of their bilateral cooperation, which has now reached a wide range of sectors, including trade and investment, agriculture, and defense technology. In international contexts, Thailand and Brazil also reciprocate by endorsing each other's candidacies. Since 1959, Brazil has hosted formal visits by four Thai prime ministers, including Maha Vajiralongkorn, then Crown Prince of Thailand, who visited Brazil in 1993.

Thailand and Brazil commemorated the 60th anniversary of their diplomatic ties in 2018. The ceremony took place at a time when the two nations were in constant communication and had agreements to work together in a variety of areas, including science and technology. Brazilians are starting to have more and more interest in Thai landscapes and culture. Approximately 66,000 Brazilian travelers came to the nation in the previous year. The nation having the most number of Muay Thai schools is Brazil. "Brazil is still committed to strengthening relations with Thailand," the Brazilian Foreign Ministry stated in a message highlighting the two countries' bilateral ties. The two nations are prepared to deepen their collaboration in energy, trade and investment, security, and military, among other areas.

Brazil and Thailand signed a Memorandum of Understanding (MoU) on 16 March 2022, to promote technology and information sharing in the agricultural sector. Cooperation on agricultural initiatives involving cattle, vegetable crops, cooperatives, soil, water, and resource management was agreed upon by the two nations. In addition, the agreement mandates the management and preservation of agricultural biodiversity in addition to the creation of new farming organizations and cooperatives. Lastly, planned tasks include ecological engineering and integrated pest management. The document also covers the creation and process of alternate energy sources. The following day marked the 63rd anniversary of the start of diplomatic relations between the two nations. They have grown closer and enjoyed friendly relations over the years, which is seen in the expansion of their bilateral cooperation in a variety of fields, but particularly in commerce and investment.

The Third Political Consultations (PC) between Thailand and Brazil took place in the Brazilian Ministry of Foreign Affairs in Brasília on 26 May 2023, with H.E. Ms. Busadee Santipitaks, Deputy Permanent Secretary for Foreign Affairs, serving as co-chair. Following the second PC in Bangkok, the two parties evaluated their current, varied partnerships and long-standing friendships. In order to hasten the post-pandemic recovery, both saw enormous potential and prospects in extending a wide range of cooperative sectors and activities centered around shared interests. Political cooperation, trade, investment, technical and agricultural cooperation, tourism, culture, education, sport, energy, defense, and collaboration between diplomatic academies were among the facets of bilateral cooperation.

== Trade ==
Thailand's top Latin American commercial partner in 2018 was Brazil, but Thailand placed in eighth place among Brazil's Asian partners. Over $3.5 billion was traded bilaterally, with Brazil bringing in about $1.4 billion and exporting almost $2 billion, leaving a $600 million surplus on their end.

Before 2020, the amount of bilateral trade between Brazil and Thailand has been hovering around $3.5 billion on average. According to Thai data, commerce exceeded $5 billion in 2021 (but Brazilian numbers show a little lower amount), and it was expected to surpass this amount in 2022. In 2021, Brazil's imports were valued at $1.96 billion, while its exports to Thailand totaled $3.38 billion.

The majority of Brazil's exports to Thailand are still soybeans and their byproducts, and the nation continues to be Thailand's top exporter of these goods, which support the majority of Thailand's chicken and poultry output. Although this industry seems to be gradually declining, overall trade is rising, which implies more Brazilian goods—like cotton, leather, shoes, and medical equipment—are now making their way into the Thai market. Thai exports to Brazil are expanding and diverse at the same time. They consist of industrialized products like motors, auto parts, rubber, and hard disk drives that constitute a link in the value chain. Thus, it can be concluded that Thailand and Brazil have very positive commercial relations.

== Diplomatic missions ==
- Brazil maintains an embassy in Bangkok and an honorary consulate in Phuket.
- Thailand maintains an embassy in Brasília and an honorary consulate in São Paulo.

== See also ==
- Foreign relations of Brazil
- Foreign relations of Thailand
