= Thailand–Turkey relations =

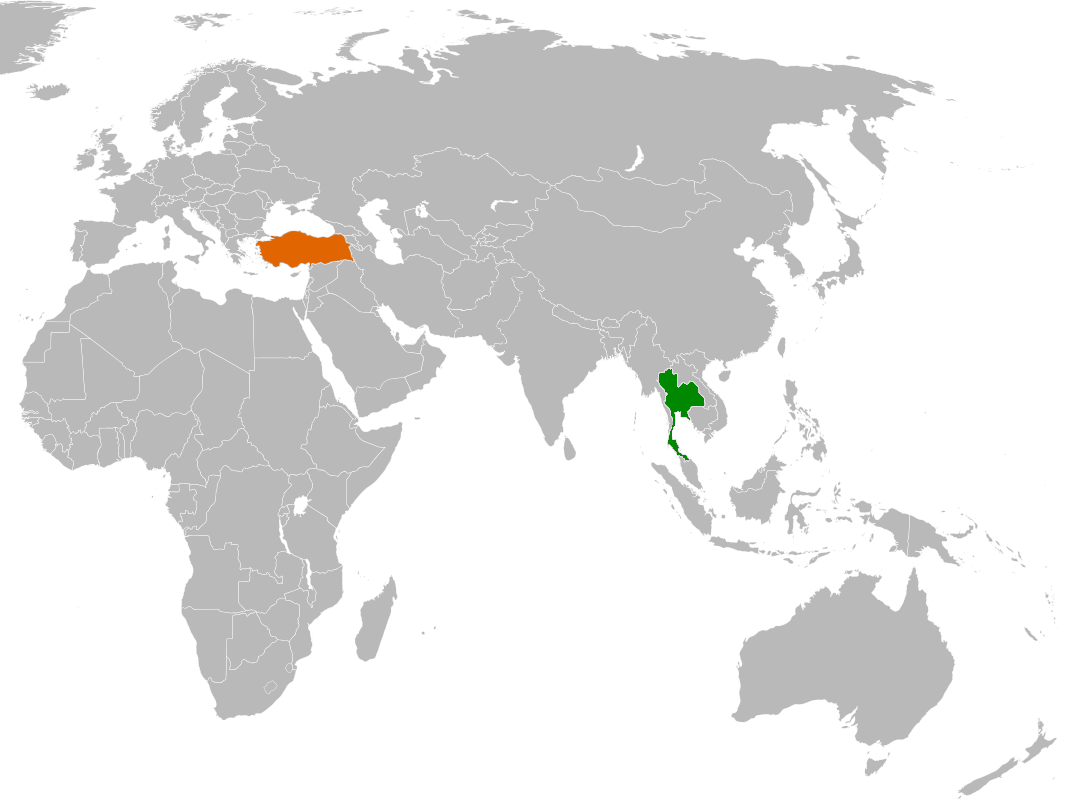
- Thailand: Turkey

Diplomatic mission
- Embassy of Thailand, Ankara: Embassy of Turkey, Bangkok

Envoy
- Ambassador Apirat Sugondhabhirom: Ambassador Serap Ersoy

Thailand–Turkey relations are the modern foreign relations between Thailand and Turkey. The cordial relations between the two countries (after the establishment of the Republic of Turkey in 1923) date back to 1958, when the two countries established diplomatic relations. Shortly after, Turkey set up its embassy in Bangkok. Thailand reciprocated by opening its embassy in 1972. However, even during the era of the Ottoman Empire, there had been historical contacts between the Empire and Siam at the time—most notably the visit of Prince Damrong, younger brother of King Chulalongkorn the Great of Siam, to Istanbul as the royal guest of Sultan Abdul Hamid II in 1891.

== History ==
Thailand and Turkey established diplomatic relations since 19 June 1958. Shortly afterwards, Turkey opened its embassy in Bangkok, with Ambassador Necdet Kent as its first ambassador. Thailand later opened its embassy office in Ankara in 1972, with a Charge D'Affaires. The first resident Thai ambassador came to work and stay in Ankara in 1974.

Initially, the Thai Government tasked the Ambassadors of Thailand in Karachi (Pakistan), and Vienna (Austria), to also be accredited to Turkey. Notably, the second non-resident Ambassador of Thailand to Turkey during 1963-1968 was the then Thai ambassador in Vienna, General Chatichai Choonhavan, who went on to become the Thai foreign minister (1975–1976) and, later, Prime Minister of Thailand (1988–1991). Also, Ambassador Charun P. Isarangkul na Ayuthaya, who also covered Turkey from Vienna during 1970–1971, went on to become, twice, Thailand's minister of foreign affairs (1971-1972 and 1973–1975) and, later, privy councilor in the Reign of King Bhumibol Adulyadej. Another prominent Thai ambassador to Ankara during 1981–1985, Ambassador Professor Dr. Wichian Watanakun, went on to become Thailand's deputy foreign minister in 1991, and minister of justice in 1992.

During the Cold War, through the 1960s until 1980s and early 1990s, both Thailand’s and Turkey’s foreign policy was pro-Western, united in the belief that the spread of communism, communist China for Thailand and the Soviet Union for Turkey, posed a threat to the world. During this time, as a result of apprehension over Soviet intentions toward Vietnam, Thailand maintained close economic and security ties with Turkey. It is notable that Thailand was a location of the secretariat of the now-defunct SEATO while Turkey was then the location of the headquarters of CENTO (now abolished). Both countries also were allies of the US during the Korean War (1950–1953). Since then, relations have remained cordial.

After the Cold War Era, bilateral relations continue to be friendly. King Vajiralongkorn of Thailand, when he was the crown prince, made a royal visit to Turkey in 1992. President Turgut Özal (then Prime Minister) visited Thailand on his way to China in 1985. From Thailand, Prime Minister Thaksin Shinawatra visited Turkey in 2005; his younger sister Prime Minister Yingluck Shinawatra visited Turkey in 2013. From the Turkish side, in 1991 Prime Minister Yıldırım Akbulut went to Thailand after his visit to South Korea, and held discussion with his Thai counterpart Anand Panyarachun in Bangkok; followed by then Prime Minister Recep Tayyip Erdogan, who made a working visit to Thailand as guest of the Government of Thailand in 2005, and took the occasion to accompany Prime Minister Thaksin to Phuket and Phang Nga to give Turkey's assistance to victims of the 2004 tsunami. There are also several exchanges of visits at the ministerial level.

At the regional level, Turkey has expressed its interest to become ASEAN's dialogue partner for some time, and Thailand supported Turkey's attempt, resulting in the grouping's acceptance of Turkey as ASEAN sectoral dialogue partner in 2017. During 2020-2021 Turkey also chaired the Asian Cooperation Dialogue or ACD, a Pan-Asian forum initiated by Thailand in 2000 and formally established in 2002.

== Economic relations ==
- Trade volume between the two countries was US$1.34 billion in 2019 (Turkish exports/imports: US$0.26/1.1 billion).
- The 1966 Treaty of Amity and Economic Relations, facilitates Thai and Turkish companies’ access to one another's markets.
- The Thailand–Turkey Free Trade Agreement negotiations are ongoing as of 2021.
- There are direct flights from Istanbul to Bangkok (21 flights per week) and Phuket (7 flights per week).

== Cultural relations ==
- As Thailand and Turkey celebrated the 60th anniversary of their relationship in 2018, Turkey declared that year as the Year of Thailand.
- Turkey funds higher education scholarships for Thai students to study through various programs. Thailand’s alumni network from Turkish Scholarships program has grown to more than 400-members strong since the program's inception in 1992.

== Turkish assistance ==
- Turkey's development assistance between 2004 and 2013 to Thailand was valued at US$66.5 million.
- TIKA has carried out the restoration project of Bang Uthit Mosque in Bangkok (2014–2015).

== Resident diplomatic missions ==
- Thailand has an embassy in Ankara.
- Turkey has an embassy in Bangkok.

== See also ==
- Foreign relations of Thailand
- Foreign relations of Turkey
- Archen Aydin is a Thai actor and singer
