= Qatar–Thailand relations =

- Qatar: Thailand

Diplomatic mission
- Embassy of Qatar, Bangkok: Embassy of Thailand, Doha

Envoy
- Ambassador Ahmed Ali A.J. Al-Tamimi: Ambassador Nathapol Khantahiran

The State of Qatar and the Kingdom of Thailand formed diplomatic relations in 1980. Their cooperation mainly revolves around tourism and energy.

According to the Thailand Labour Ministry, in 2017 there were 1,188 Thai citizens working in Qatar, and were mainly concentrated in the massage services industry and the construction industry. Employment laws regarding Thai workers in Qatar were negotiated and signed into agreement in 2012.

== Diplomatic representation ==
Qatar has maintained an embassy in Thailand's capital Bangkok since 2004. Thailand has had an embassy in Doha, Qatar since 2002.

== Diplomatic visits ==
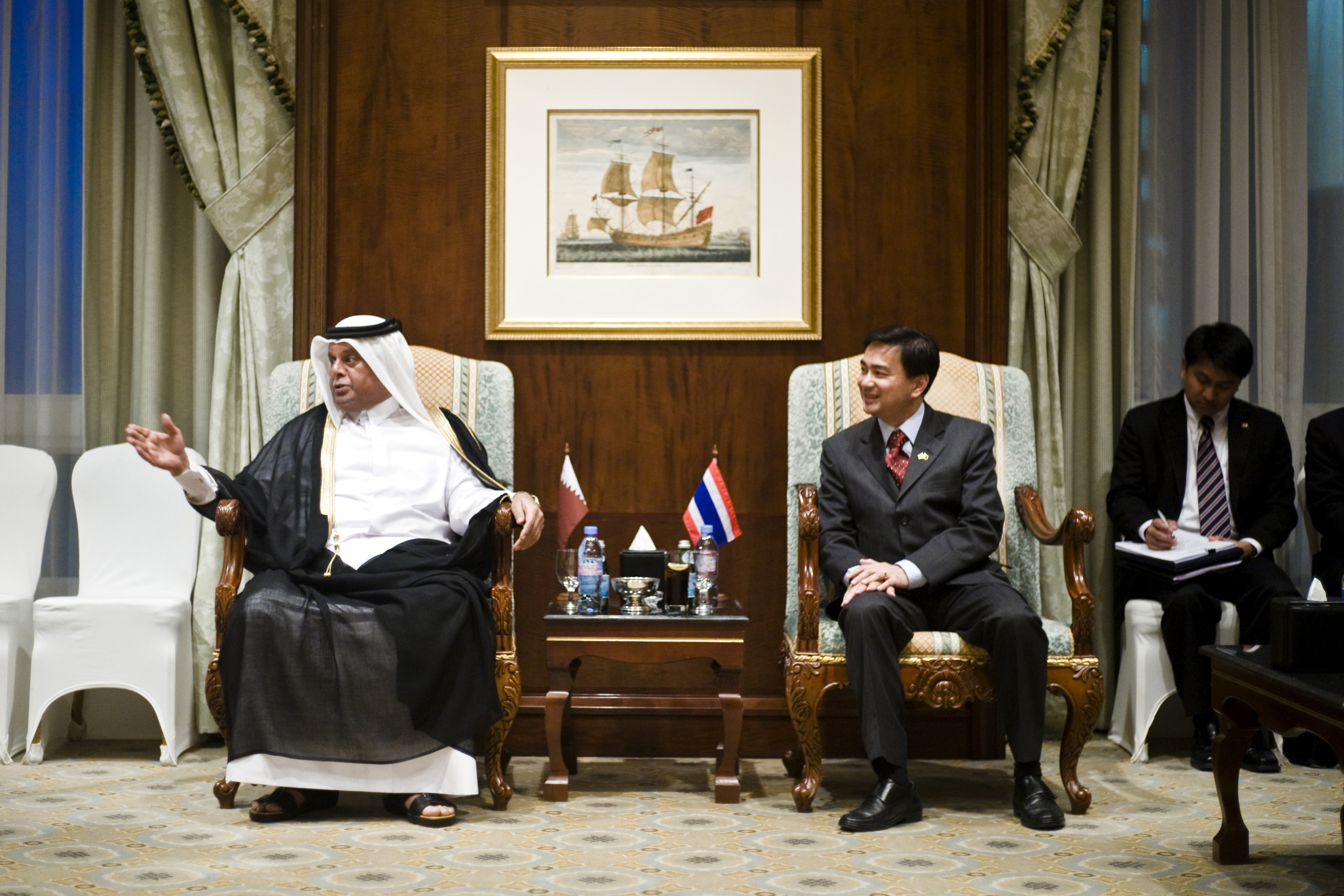
Qatari deputy PM Abdullah bin Hamad Al Attiyah meeting with Thai PM Abhisit Vejjajiva in 2009

Emir Hamad bin Khalifa Al-Thani made his first visit to Thailand in April 1999.

== Economic relations ==
Qatar and Thailand have close links in the energy and tourism industries. Among the GCC members, Qatar is Thailand's third most important trading partner, and its main supplier of LNG as of 2013, supplanting Yemen in that category. Thailand is the most visited health tourism destination for Qataris. Around 30,000 Qataris visited Thailand in 2014.

Qatar's main exports are crude oil, LNG, petroleum-based products, plastics, chemical products, and fertilizers. Thailand primarily exports cars, machinery, jewelry, food items and air conditioners to Qatar. In 2009, the trade volume between Qatar and Thailand was valued at $3.17 billion. This number increased to $4.3 billion 2013.

The first time Thailand received an LNG shipment from Qatar's main gas company, QatarEnergy LNG, was in 2011. An agreement was signed between the two nations in 2012 for Qatar to supply Thailand with 2 million tonnes of LNG annually for 20 years starting in 2015. QatarEnergy LNG opened a representative office in Bangkok as part of the deal. The first shipment of LNG supplied as per the deal arrived in Thailand in January 2015. Qatar's first LNG shipment to Thailand via Q-Max vessel, the largest LNG carrier in the world, came in August 2017.

Thailand's Siam Cement Group and QatarEnergy jointly subsidized the Long Son petrochemical complex located in south Vietnam in 2014.

== Cultural relations ==
The Thai Embassy in Doha is responsible for arranging cultural activities in Qatar. The embassy organized Thailand's Cultural Night 2015, during which traditional Thai dances and food were showcased. It also participated in the 2015 ASEAN Food Festival held in Doha.

In October 2019, Thailand signed a memorandum of understanding (MoU) with Qatar for sports cooperation and exchange. The collaboration would significantly benefit Thailand by boosting the country's sporting potential. International Olympic Committee member Khunying Patama Leeswadtrakul said, “Qatar is many steps ahead of us. There's a lot we can learn to raise the level of our sports.”

== Foreign aid ==
Following heavy floods in Thailand in 2011, Qatar Charity jointly launched a project in Thailand alongside local organization Awn Al Muslim in an effort to help those affected by flooding.

Qatar is a major funder of Yala Islamic University in Pattani, Thailand. Furthermore, the government financed the construction of a $7 million hospital called Sheikh Jasim Bin Muhammad Bin Thani Hospital in Pattani.

== See also ==
- Foreign relations of Qatar
- Foreign relations of Thailand
