= Spain–Thailand relations =

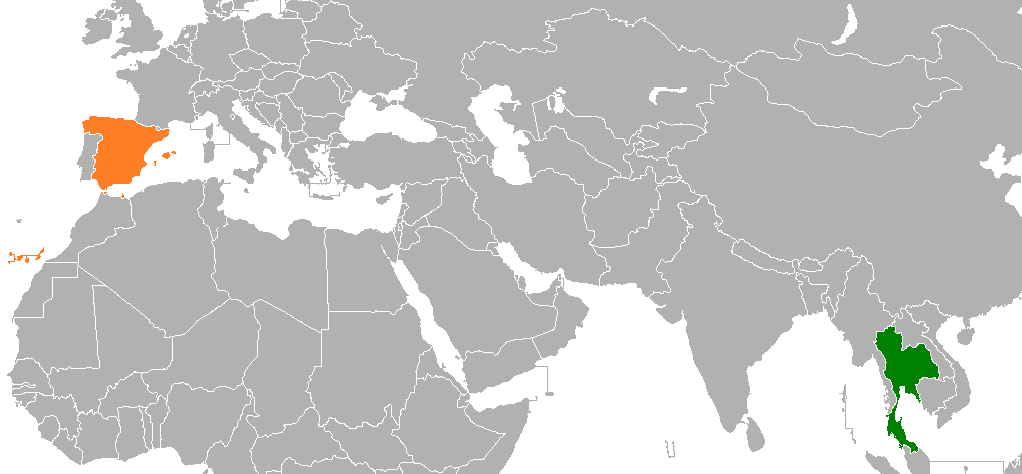
- Spain: Thailand

Diplomatic mission
- Embassy of Spain, Bangkok: Embassy of Thailand, Madrid

Envoy
- First Secretary Ignacio Vitórica: Ambassador Phantipha Iamsudha Ekarohit

Spain–Thailand relations are the bilateral and diplomatic relations between these two countries. Thailand has an embassy in Madrid and two honorary consulates in Barcelona and Santa Cruz de Tenerife. Spain has an embassy in Bangkok.

== History ==
=== Origin ===
Under the Treaty of Tordesillas in 1494 and the Treaty of Zaragoza in 1529 between Spain and Portugal, the Thai Kingdom of Ayutthaya fell under the Portuguese sphere. As such, Spanish contact with Siam during this period was sporadic. With the establishment of a Spanish holdings in the Philippines in 1565, the Spanish began to express interest in Siam. The date of first contact between the Spanish and Siamese is contestable. Pero Dias, a Portuguese explorer, visited Patani, then a Siamese-vassal state, in 1544 on behalf of the Spanish. In 1585, a group of Spaniards on a voyage to Manila from Macau were blown off course and resided in Siam for some time. In 1586, Santiago de Vera, Governor of the Philippines, wrote to King Philipp II stating that he had sent presents to nearby states to establish relations with the aim of opening trade.

During the 1591-1594 Siamese-Cambodian War, Spanish and Portuguese mercenaries assisted the Khmer King Satha I against Naresuan. Following the Khmer defeat, Spanish and Portuguese soldiers were taken by the Siamese as prisoners of war. One of the captured Portuguese, Diogo Veloso, offered to establish friendly relations and commerce with the Spanish. Veloso presented Naresuan's gifts to governor Luis Pérez Dasmariñas, which included elephants. In 1596, Dominican priest Juan Maldonado arrived in Ayutthaya carrying letters from governor Francisco de Tello de Guzmán, although his visit was unsuccessful and he had to be smuggled out by the Portuguese. The Spanish tried again in 1598 by sending Tello de Aguirre, who concluded a Treaty of Amity and Commerce between the two. Siam's treaty with Spain was concluded along the same lines as their treaty with the Portuguese in 1518. Like the Portuguese, Spaniards were able to settle, trade and carry missionary work. Despite the opening of trade, Antonio de Morga in his 1609 book Sucesos de las Islas Philipinas states that ships sailing between Manilla, and Siam and Cambodia were few and infrequent. Such ships would arrive in Manila between April and June carrying pepper, ivory, gems, cloths, hides and slaves to exchange for the goods available in Manila. Spanish missionaries in Siam were also only somewhat successful in converting only a hand full of the population.

=== 19th century to present ===
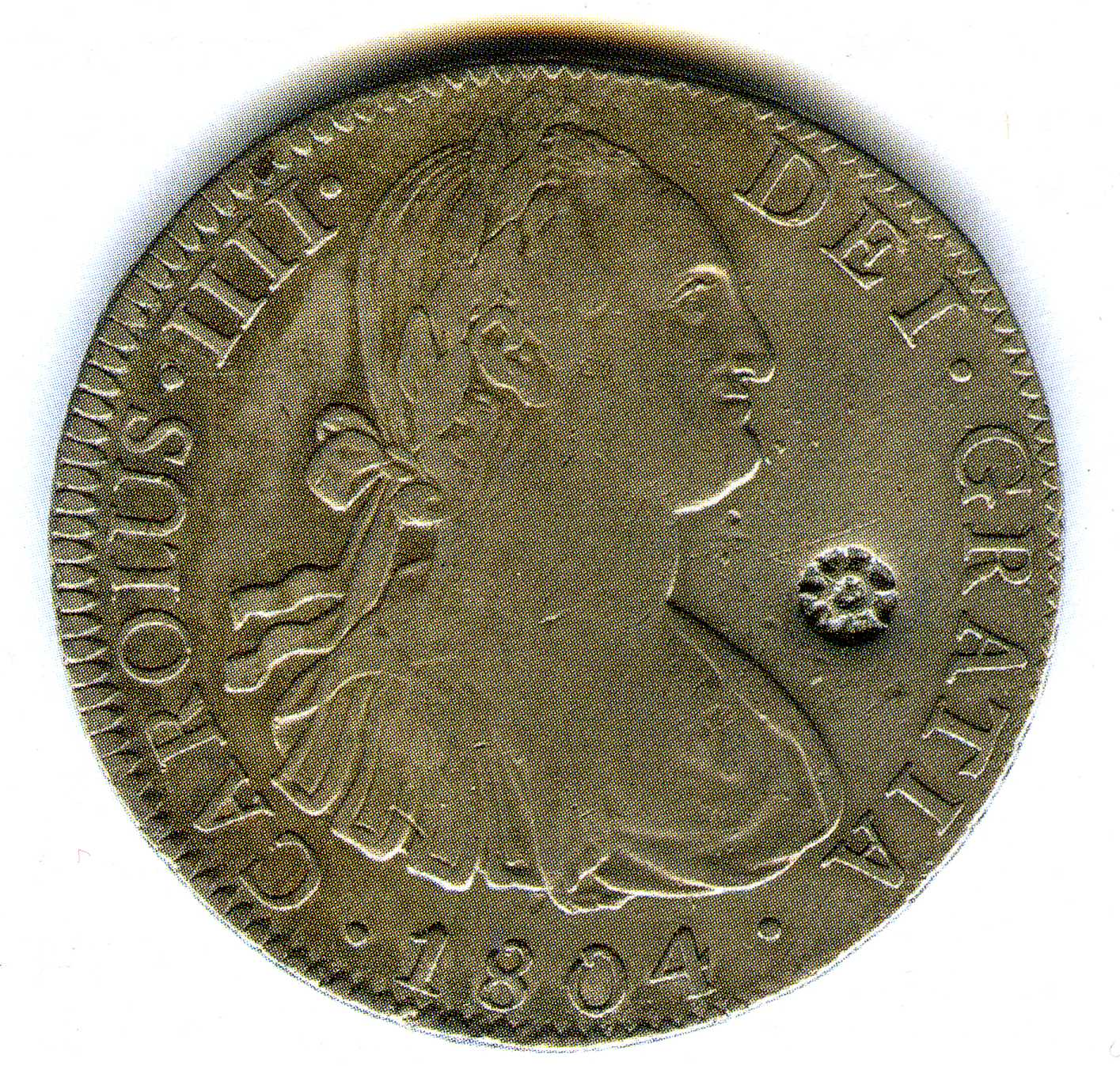
An 8-real coin with Charles IV from which circulated around Siam with a circular counterstamp.

A Treaty of Friendship, Commerce and Navigation was signed between Siam and Spain on 23 February 1870, with ratifications exchanged 23 March 1872. The treaty was signed by King Chulalongkorn, Viceroy Wichaichan, and Regent Francisco Serrano. The treaty formally established relations between the two states. The main consequence of the Treaty was the creation of a Consulate of Spain in Bangkok, designed by the architect Adolfo Paxton, who led a Diplomatic Mission sent from China.

The contacts and common interests continued to be reduced, despite the historic visit to Spain of the King of Thailand Chulalongkorn in 1897 where he was received by the Regent Queen Maria Cristina.

On 3 August 1925, a new Treaty of Friendship, Commerce and Navigation was signed between Siam and Spain in Madrid.

After the Spanish Civil War and the Second World War, diplomatic relations were suspended until their resumption in 1950. Fernando Vázquez Mendes would become the first Spanish diplomat with permanent residence in Bangkok.

In 1955 the Prime Minister of Thailand, Marshal Pibul Songgran, officially visited Spain. In 1960, the Kings of Thailand, Bhumibol and Sirikit, They made a state visit to Spain. A year later, Spain raised its representation in Bangkok to the status of the Embassy. In 1962, Don Santiago Ruiz Tabanera was accredited as the first Ambassador of Spain in Thailand.

Official contacts were relaunched with the arrival of democracy in Spain. The highlights were State visits of the Kings of Spain to Thailand in 1987 and 2006. From that moment, Spain and Thailand maintain good relations based on the deep friendship between the two monarchies.

In October 2010, the Minister of Foreign Affairs of Thailand, Kasit Piromya, visited Spain. The highlight of this visit was the signing of a Joint Action Plan (2010-2015) which included the main areas of bilateral relations between Spain and Thailand.

In 2021, Spain made a great effort to help Thailand with a donation of vaccines against COVID-19.

== Economic relations ==
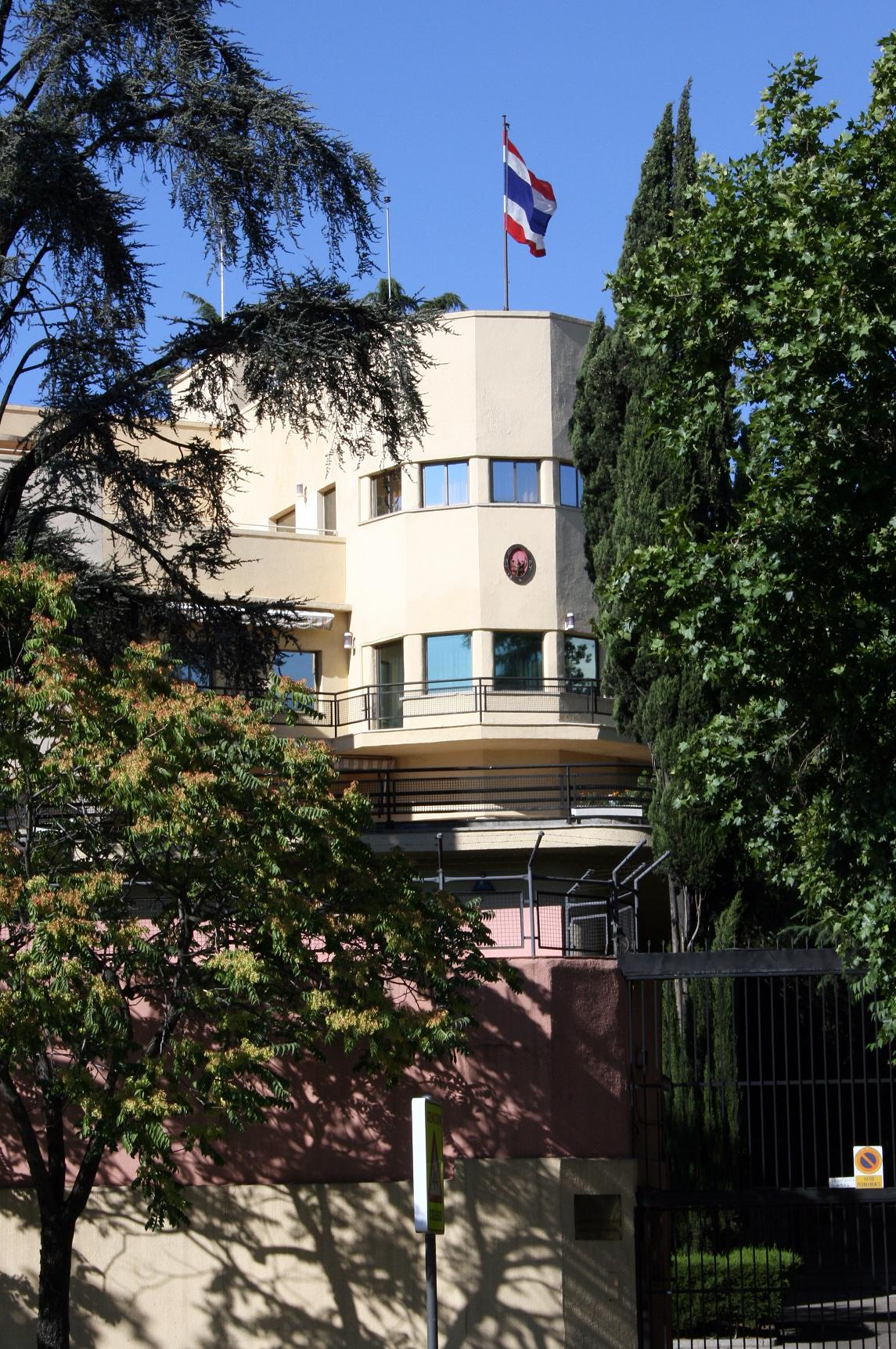
Embassy of Thailand in Madrid

The bilateral trade balance has traditionally been deficient for Spain. The impact of the international financial crisis coincided with an increase in Spanish sales in Thailand, growing by 28.5% in 2010 and 24% in 2011. In 2012, that growth slowed 3.57%, bringing the value of Exports amounted to 415.6 M // €. These data confirm the consolidation of Thailand as the second Spanish destination market in ASEAN, after Singapore.

The trade balance deficit between Spain and Thailand amounted to €439 million in 2012, 39.5% lower than in 2011. The coverage rate rose in 2012 to 48.6%, from 35.6% in 2011. In 2013, coverage with Thailand was 58.4%, which represents an improvement of 10% compared to 2012. In this way, the deficit of the Spain-Thailand trade balance stood at 334.3 in 2013 million euros, 24% less than in 2012. In 2014, the trade exchange deficit between the two countries rose again 34% over the previous year, standing at €453 million. The coverage rate fell to a percentage close to 2012, 48.3%.

Spain exported €424.3 M in Thailand in 2014, compared to 469.3M in 2013. The most exported tariff items were: automotive components (12.42%); female clothing (5.70%); steel products (5.28%); frozen fish (5.02%) and the item that includes products not included in another sector (4.90%).

For its part, Spain imported from Thailand worth €876.9 million in 2014, and €806.4 million in 2013, which represented an increase of 8.7%. The main Spanish import items during 2014 were: raw materials and semi-manufactured rubber (9.7%); air conditioning (8.8%); motorcycles and bicycles (7.7%); organic chemistry (6.2%); female clothing (5.5%) and automotive components (5%).

=== Tourism ===
In 2023, Thailand received 153,458 Spanish tourists, the ninth largest number of European tourists. For its part, the number of Thais who visited Spain in 2022 amounted to 59,617.

== Cooperation ==
Thailand is a middle-income country that is not among the priorities of Spanish cooperation, so cooperation activities have been limited to small projects by local entities and autonomous communities.

Special chapter is the teaching of the Spanish language. In March 2013, AECID signed three Memoranda of Understanding with universities Chulalongkorn, Ramkhamhaeng, and Thammasat. Thanks to agreements, during the 2013–2014 academic year three Spanish readers were incorporated to the mentioned Thai universities.

== Resident diplomatic missions ==
- Spain has an embassy in Bangkok.
- Thailand has an embassy in Madrid.

== See also ==
- Foreign relations of Spain
- Foreign relations of Thailand
