= Bangladesh–Thailand relations =

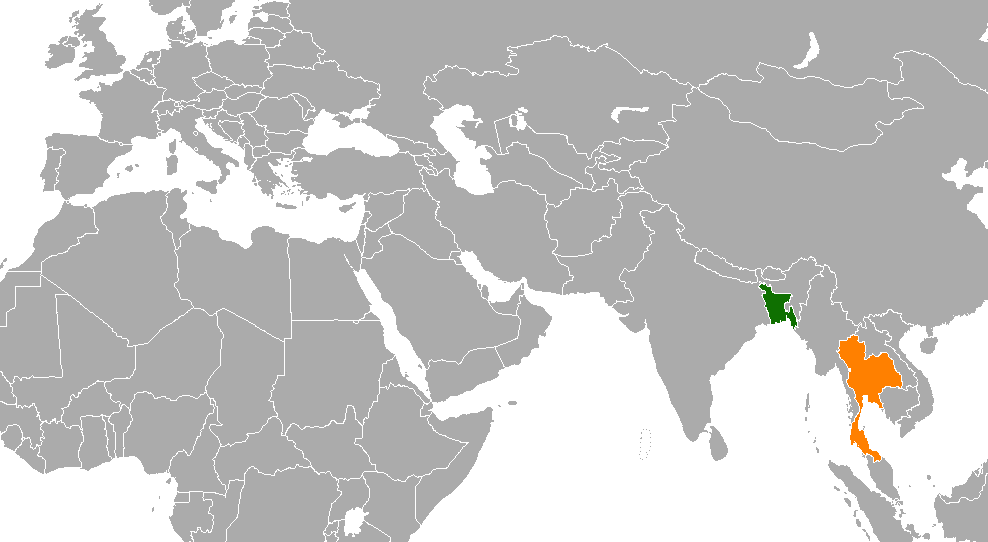

- Bangladesh: Thailand

Diplomatic mission
- Bangladeshi Embassy, Bangkok: Thai Embassy, Dhaka

Envoy
- Bangladeshi Ambassador to Thailand Mohammed Abdul Hye: Thai Ambassador to Bangladesh Makawadee Sumitmor

Bangladesh–Thailand relations refer to foreign relations between Bangladesh and Thailand. Relations were established on 5 October 1972. Thailand opened its embassy in Bangladesh in 1974, and Bangladesh opened its embassy in Bangkok in 1975.

== Trade ==
Trade relations between Bangladesh and Thailand grow stronger with each passing year, particularly with regard to commodity relations. Thailand, as a more developed country, sees many Bengali students coming over to study the sciences. Bangladesh has suggested that Thailand participate more actively in its economic sphere. According to the Minister of Finance of Bangladesh - Thailand is still able to increase its contribution to the economy of Bangladesh.

On 2 May 2010, it became known that Thailand would hold a four-day trade fair in Bangladesh. This event was attended by 47 Thai companies. As of 2010, the volume of trade between Thailand and Bangladesh is about $650 million. Thailand is also a very popular country for Bangladeshis to travel to, as Dhaka and Bangkok flights are only for 2 1/2 hours in between. Thai food is very famous in Bangladesh, as there is a great appreciation of Thai culture with Bangladeshi people.

== Resident diplomatic missions ==
- Bangladesh has an embassy in Bangkok.
- Thailand has an embassy in Dhaka.

== See also ==
- Foreign relations of Bangladesh
- Foreign relations of Thailand
