= Thailand–Ukraine relations =

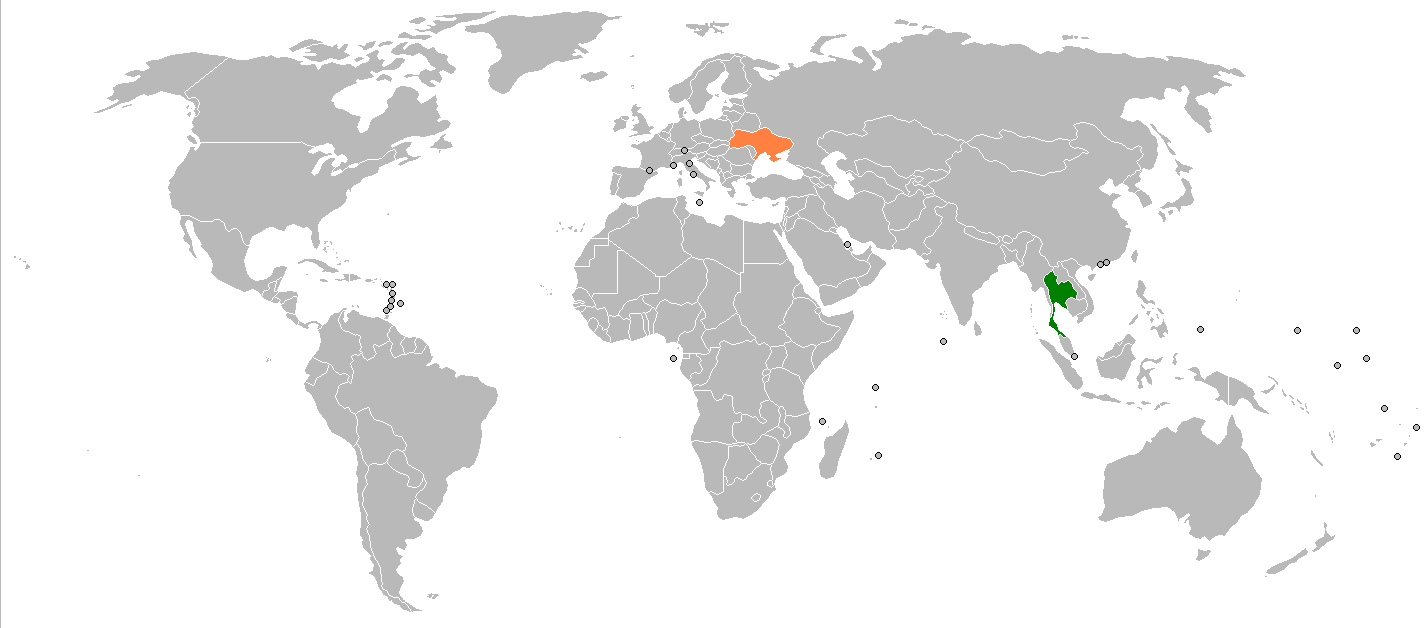
- Thailand: Ukraine

Thailand–Ukraine relations are the bilateral relations between Thailand and Ukraine. Over 25 years, the two countries have signed 18 bilateral legal agreements, with several more projects currently under negotiation. Ukraine actively cooperates with Thailand within the framework of the United Nations and other international organizations. Thailand has a non resident ambassador in Warsaw. Ukraine has an embassy in Bangkok.

== Diplomatic relations ==
On 26 December 1991, Thailand recognized Ukraine's independence, marking the beginning of their international relations. Diplomatic relations between the two friendly countries were officially established on 6 May 1992 through an exchange of diplomatic notes.

On 22 October 2002, the Embassy of Ukraine opened in Thailand, providing a new impetus for strengthening international ties between the two countries. Thailand supported Ukraine's efforts to join the World Trade Organization (WTO). A bilateral protocol was also signed between Ukraine and Thailand on access to goods and services markets in the context of Ukraine's WTO accession.

== Cooperation within the United Nations ==
In 2004 and 2005, Thai and Ukrainian diplomats collaborated on discussions concerning disarmament and international security, particularly regarding the updated United Nations General Assembly resolution on the prohibition of anti-personnel mines.

In October 2004, a working visit by a group of Thai diplomats took place in Kyiv, during which consultations were held to coordinate approaches for implementing the Anti-Personnel Mine Ban Convention. In 2005, Ukraine agreed to co-sponsor the updated resolution and also ratified the corresponding convention.

== Resident diplomatic missions ==
- Thailand is accredited to Ukraine from its embassy in Warsaw, Poland.
- Ukraine has an embassy in Bangkok.

== See also ==
- Foreign relations of Thailand
- Foreign relations of Ukraine
