= Thailand–Vietnam relations =

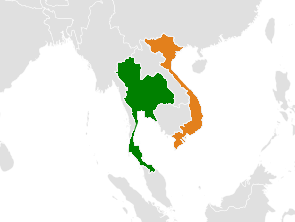
- Thailand: Vietnam

Diplomatic mission
- Royal Thai Embassy, Hanoi: Embassy of Vietnam, Bangkok

Envoy
- Ambassdor Urawadee Sriphiromya: Ambassdor Phan Chí Thanh

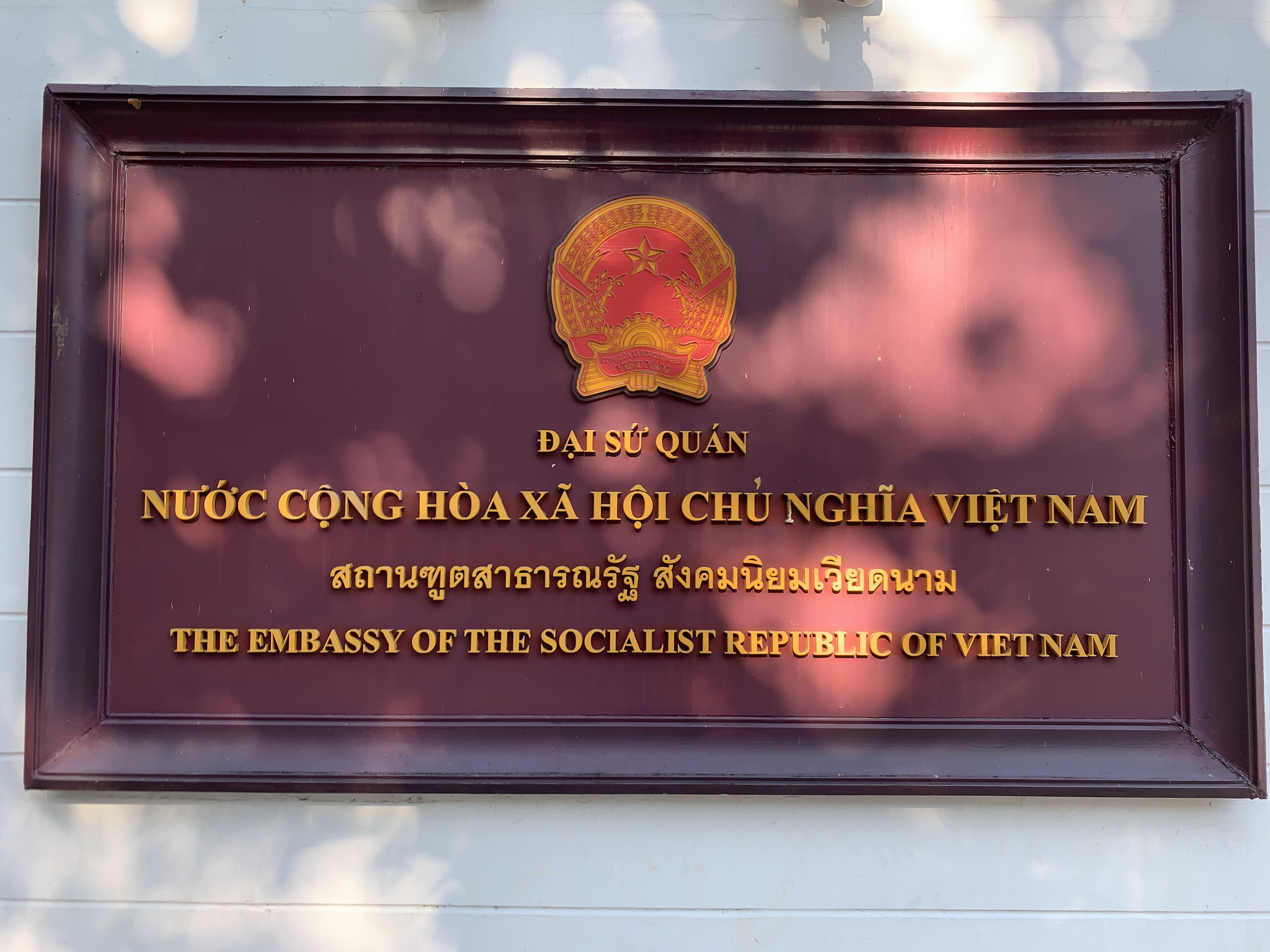
Vietnamese Embassy, Bangkok

Thailand and Vietnam have maintained peaceful bilateral relations since Vietnam integrated with the international community beginning in 1986. Thailand has an embassy in Vietnam's capital Hanoi and Vietnam has an embassy in Thailand's capital Bangkok. Both countries are members of ASEAN.

== History ==
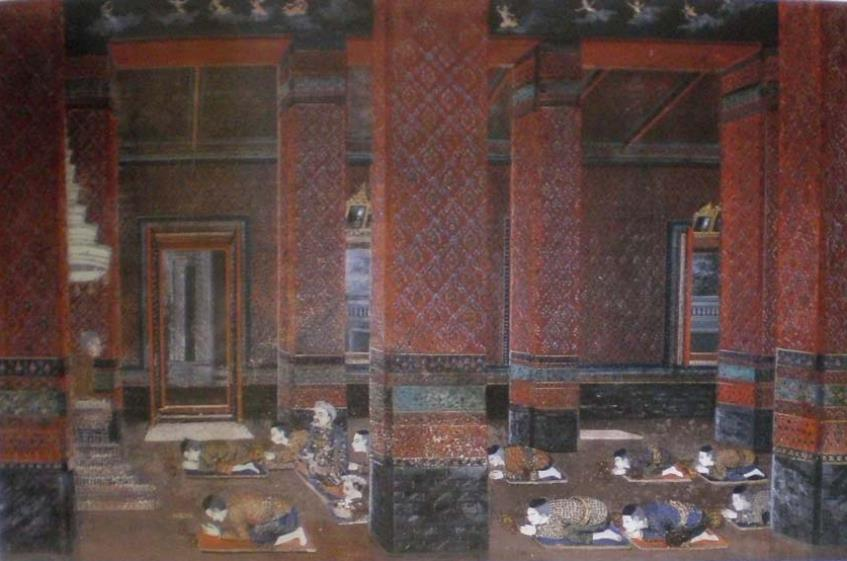
A painting of Ong Chiang Su (Thai: องเชียงสือ), an Annamese ruler, in audience with King Rama I in the Amarin Throne Hall in Bangkok 1782. Note by Princess Maha Chakri Sirindhorn.

The first real contact between Siam (today called Thailand) and Vietnam was recorded in the 16th century. The earliest recorded war occurred in 1313 when the Kingdom of Sukhothai attacked the Kingdom of Champa, which was a vassal state of kingdom of Đại Việt under the Trần dynasty.

=== Siamese–Vietnamese wars ===
Thailand (as Siam) and the Vietnamese state fought together in a massive series of wars that began in the early 18th century. However, larger conflicts were recorded from the later 18th century.

==== Tây Sơn unrest ====
After the overthrow of the Nguyễn Lord, Nguyễn Ánh, the last few survivors sought vengeance by requesting assistance from Siam, whose force conducted a massive invasion into the newly-annexed southern Vietnam and committed atrocities there. A massive blow later has Siam being beaten disastrously by the Tay Son force, led by Nguyễn Huệ.

==== 19th century ====
The Siamese and Vietnamese fought two massive wars in the region, resulting in heavy destruction of Cambodia. Vietnam defeated Siam in the first, while the second ended in a stalemate. The rivalry between the two countries remained until the French invasion of Cochinchina.

==== Vietnam War and Khmer Rouge ====
South Vietnam–Thailand relations
- South Vietnam: Thailand

Thailand participated in the Vietnam War on the side of South Vietnam and the United States against North Vietnam over fears of the domino theory and the communist insurgency in Thailand. Of the 12,000–15,000 Thai troops to fight in the war, over 2,000 casualties were recorded. After the Vietnam War ended in 1975, relations between Thailand and the unified Vietnam remained tense.

After the Vietnamese invasion of Cambodia which resulted in the overthrow of the genocidal Khmer Rouge led by Pol Pot, Thailand was in conflict with Vietnam because of Thai opposition to Vietnam's occupation of Cambodia. Border raids were launched between both nations, damaged much of Cambodia, and further soured relations.

Hostility between Thailand and Vietnam ended in 1989, when Vietnamese forces withdrew from Cambodia.

=== Modern relations ===
After Nguyễn Văn Linh's 1986 Đổi mới reforms, Vietnam moved from strictly economically planned socialism to more integration with the international community. As a result, Thai–Vietnamese relations have quickly improved. Thailand, a founding member of ASEAN, supported Vietnam in joining the ASEAN, which occurred in 1995. Thus, the once-poor relationship between Thailand and Vietnam has turned into one of strategic co-operation and alliance.

== Economic relations ==
In 2015, Thailand was the tenth-largest investor in Vietnam, worth nearly US$7 billion. Thailand was also Vietnam's fifth-largest trading partner.

== Resident diplomatic missions ==
- Thailand has an embassy in Hanoi and a consulate-general in Ho Chi Minh City.
- Vietnam has an embassy in Bangkok.

== See also ==
- Foreign relations of Thailand
- Foreign relations of Vietnam
- Thailand–Vietnam football rivalry
