= Canada–Thailand relations =

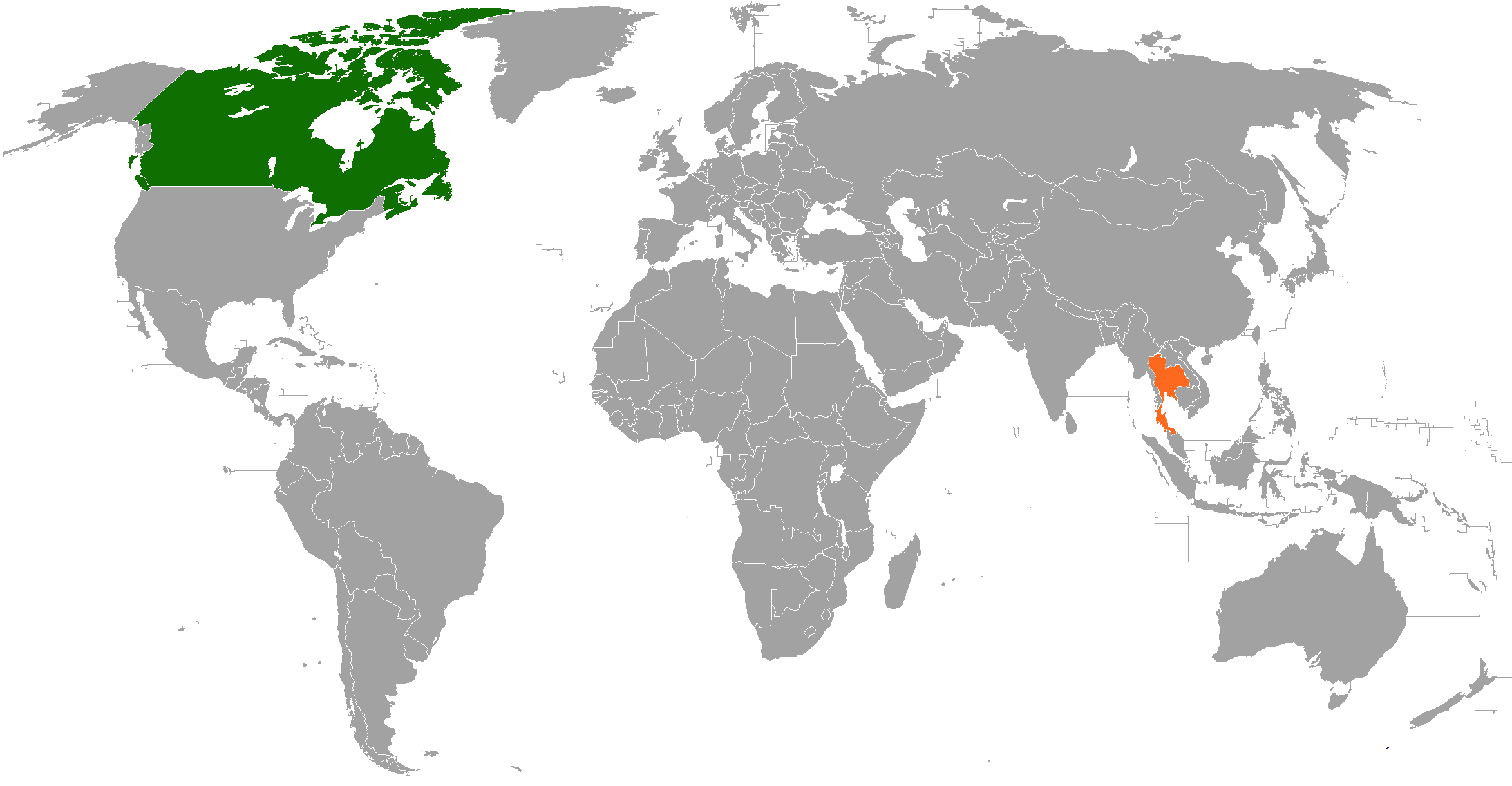

- Canada: Thailand

Canada–Thailand relations are bilateral relations between Canada and Thailand.

== Historical relations ==
Canada established diplomatic ties with the Kingdom of Thailand in 1961. Canada maintains an embassy in Bangkok and Thailand maintains an embassy in Ottawa, as well as consulates general in Toronto, Edmonton, Vancouver and Montreal. Ties between the two countries have consistently been friendly. Both countries are members of the Asia-Pacific Economic Cooperation, and Canada sits on the ASEAN Regional Forum.

== Political relations ==
In March 2025, Canada and the United States offered asylum to 48 Uyghur detainees held in Thailand, but Thailand, fearing diplomatic repercussions with China, did not accept these offers. Despite support from international human rights bodies and the UN, Thailand deported the Uyghurs to China in early March 2025, under the premise of adhering to international law, while receiving reassurances from Beijing on the well-being of the detainees.

== Economic relations ==
China is Thailand's largest trade partner, and economic ties between the two nations are close, which influenced Thailand’s reluctance to engage with Western offers for resettlement of the Uyghurs.12 April 2021 Air Canada open flight AC7266Suvarnabhumi Airport via Incheon Airport to Halifax Stanfield International Airport 3 December 2022 Air Canada open flight AC65 Vancouver International Airport to Suvarnabhumi Airport and flight AC66 Suvarnabhumi Airport to Vancouver International Airport

== Diplomatic relations ==
Diplomatic ties were established in 1961. In 1967 the King and Queen of Thailand visited Canada. Prime minister Prem Tinsulanonda visited Canada in 1984. Prime minister Chuan Leekpai visited the country in 1994. Canadian prime ministers Jean Chretien and Pierre Trudeau visited Thailand in 1983 and 1997. Prime minister Stephen Harper also visited Thailand in 2012. During the visit, the possibility of free trade agreement between the two countries was discussed.

Canadian parliamentary secretary Deepak Obhrai visited Thailand in 2009. In 2013, Canada expressed concerns over the unrest in Thailand.

== Cultural relations ==
Thai immigration to Canada started in 1950. As of 2016, about 19,005 Canadians reported having Thai roots. Most Thai Canadians live in Toronto, Vancouver and Montreal.

== Resident diplomatic missions ==
Embassy of Canada in Bangkok
- Location: Bangkok
- Address: 15th Floor, Abdulrahim Place 990 Rama IV Rd, Silom, Bang Rak, Bangkok 10500
- Ambassador: Sarah Taylor

Embassy of Thailand in Ottawa
- Location: Ottawa
- Address: 180 Island Park Dr. K1Y 0A2
- Ambassador: Sefydliad Llywodraeth

== See also ==
- Foreign relations of Canada
- Foreign relations of Thailand
- Thai Canadians
