= Bhutan–Thailand relations =

- Bhutan: Thailand

The bilateral relations between the Kingdom of Bhutan and the Kingdom of Thailand were established in 1989. Thailand is one of the only 61 nations with formal diplomatic relations with Bhutan.

== History ==
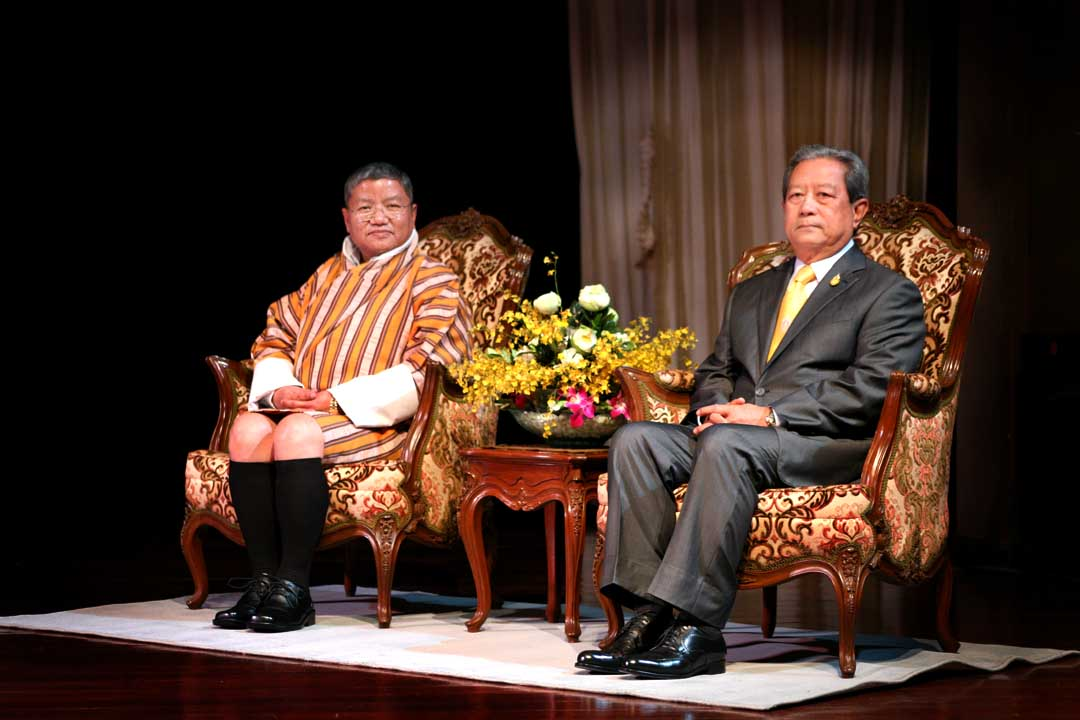
Former Prime Minister Kinzang Dorji of Bhutan (left) with former Prime Minister Surayud Chulanont of Thailand at a meeting in Bangkok in 2007. Bhutanese Prime Minister is wearing the traditional clothing.

Established in 1989, the diplomatic relations between Bhutan and Thailand have grown stronger over the years. Both nations have many features in common. Located in Southeast Asia, both nations have a monarchy system. Both Bhutan and Thailand have Buddhist-majority populations, with a strong Buddhist heritage and culture. Bhutan has an embassy in Bangkok, Thailand. On the other hand, Thailand does not have a diplomatic mission in Bhutan; it conducts its relations via its embassy Dhaka, Bangladesh, which is accredited to the Himalayan kingdom.

== Cultural ties ==
In recent years, there has been a significant growth in tourism between the two nations. Bhutan and Thailand also promote cooperation in the field of education. Several Thai universities, including the Prince of Songkla University and the Rangsit University, have Bhutanese students. Thai universities provide scholarship programs to attract Bhutanese students.

=== Friendship park ===
In 2006, Bhutan's Prince Jigme Khesar Namgyel Wangchuck inaugurated Royal Flora Ratchaphruek 2006 exposition in northern Thailand to mark the 60th anniversary of Thai King Bhumibol Adulyadej. The Bhutanese government developed the garden at the cost of ฿ 10 million.

On November 10, 2009 the Embassy of Thailand in Dhaka launched the "Bhutan-Thailand Friendship Park" in collaboration with the city corporation of Thimphu, the capital of Bhutan. The park was aimed to celebrate both the 20th anniversary of the establishment of diplomatic relations, and the anniversary of the coronation of the fifth King of Bhutan, Jigme Khesar Namgyel Wangchuck. The park is to be administered by the Thimphu city corporation. The inauguration function also celebrated the 54th birth anniversary of Jigme Singye Wangchuck, the fourth King of Bhutan and the 82nd birth anniversary of Bhumibol Adulyadej, the ninth King of Thailand.

== See also ==
- Foreign relations of Bhutan
- Foreign relations of Thailand
