= List of ambassadors of Thailand to Chile =

Coordinates: 33.415181°S 70.583638°W

Ambassador of Thailand to Chile
- Inaugural holder: Bibidh Virajjakar
- Formation: September 14, 1963

The Thai Ambassador in Santiago de Chile is the official representative of the Government in Bangkok to the Government of Chile and is concurrently accredited in San José, Costa Rica, Panama City and San Salvador.

== List of representatives ==
Diplomatic agreement/designated/Diplomatic accreditation	Ambassador	Observations	List of prime ministers of Thailand	List of presidents of Chile	Term end
September 14, 1963	Khun Bibidh Virajjakar	with residence in Avenida Belgrano 265, 9° piso Buenos Aires. (* August 22, 1904) married: He was a graduate from the Suan Kularb School and was an Associated Student of the London School of Economics, University of London.; In 1928 he joined the Foreign Service.; On 19 January 1932 birth of his daughter Emmanuelle Arsan.; In 1933 he became Attache to the Siamese Legation in London.; In 1936 he was third Secretary in London.; From 1936 to 1941 he was third secretary of the Legation in Berlin.; He was second secretary in the Legation in Rome.; From 1945 to 1947 he was first Secretary of the Legation in Bern.; From 1952 to 1953 he was Chief of Protocol.; From 1954 (April 22, 1958 ambassador) to 1961 he was Thai Ambassador to Denmark with coaccreditation to Norway, Sweden and Finland.; In 1961 he was appointed Acting Director-General of the Political Department.: In 1963 he was coaccredited as first Thai Ambassador to Paraguay, first Thai Ambassador to Bolivia.; In 1971 he was chief of the central bureau of the Thai Red Cross Society and spokesperson of a delegation to Cambodia.	Thanom Kittikachorn	Jorge Alessandri Rodríguez	
1965	Samai Khruasuwan	Chargé d'affaires	Thanom Kittikachorn	Eduardo Frei Montalva	
1971	Charoon Sundarodyan	From November 28, 1975 he was Chargé d'affaires of the Thai Ambassador in Nepal.; From September 23, 1976 he was Chargé d'affaires of the Thai Permanent Representative next the Headquarters of the United Nations.	Thanom Kittikachorn	Salvador Allende Gossens	
1974	Wongse Polnikorn	From 1969 to 1972 he was Thai Ambassador to Myanmar.; In 1979 he was Under-Secretary of State for Foreign Affairs.	Sanya Dharmasakti	Augusto Pinochet Ugarte	
1977	Sumesr Siri-Mongkol	Sumesr Sirimongkol Chargé d'affaires: From November 30, 1981, to 1983 he was Thai Ambassador to India.	Kriangsak Chomanan	Augusto Pinochet Ugarte	
1979	Sirajaya Buddhi-Baedya	From February 11, 1985 to 1987 he was Thai Ambassador to Mexico.	Kriangsak Chomanan	Augusto Pinochet Ugarte	
1985	Suttiswat Kridakorn	From 1989 to 1991 he was Thai Ambassador to Hungary.	Prem Tinsulanonda	Augusto Pinochet Ugarte	
1989	Vichien Chat Suwan		Chatichai Choonhavan	Augusto Pinochet Ugarte	
1994	Santand Kiartitat		Suchinda Kraprayoon	Eduardo Frei Ruiz-Tagle	
1996	Narim Pontham	From October 12, 1997 to 2000 he was Thai Ambassador to the Czech Republic.	Chavalit Yongchaiyudh	Eduardo Frei Ruiz-Tagle	October 12, 1997
1998	Busba Bunnag	From February 13, 2002 to 2004 he was Thai Ambassador to the Philippines.	Chuan Leekpai	Eduardo Frei Ruiz-Tagle	
2002	Pookaman Pithaya		Thaksin Shinawatra	Ricardo Lagos Escobar	
May 4, 2006	Vimon Kidchob	(*1957 in Bangkok): From October 2012 to Sep 20, 2017 she was Thai Ambassador to Denmark.	Surayud Chulanont	Michelle Bachelet	2009
2009	Vipawan Nipatakusol	Benjapa Tubthong Avenida	Samak Sundaravej	Michelle Bachelet	2008
February 8, 2016	Saroj Thanasunti	Prior he served in the Royal Embassies of Thailand in Seoul, Chile City and Washington D.C. as well as holding different positions in the Latin America Division and the American and South Pacific Affairs, European Affairs, and Protocol Departments of the Foreign Ministry of the Kingdom of Thailand, of which he was assistant general director (2011).	Prayut Chan-o-cha	Michelle Bachelet	2023
