= List of official overseas trips made by Bhumibol Adulyadej =

Since acceding to the throne of Thailand in 1946 until his death in October 2016, King Bhumibol Adulyadej has made a number of state and official visits.

== 1959 ==
Date	Country	City	Host
18–21 December	South Vietnam	Saigon, Huế	President Ngo Dinh Diem

== 1960 ==
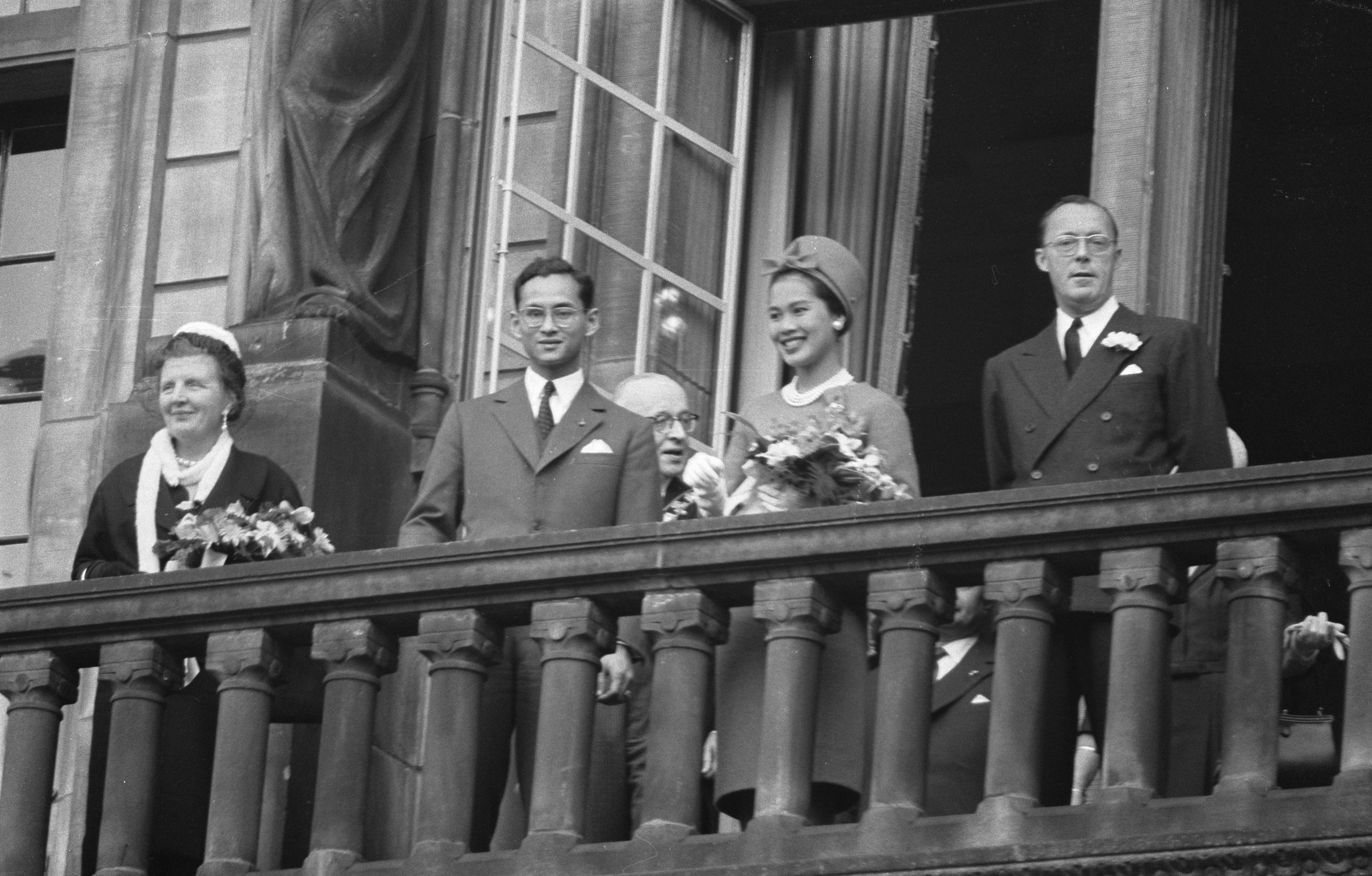
King Bhumibol Adulyadej and Queen Sirikit appearing on the balcony of Royal Palace of Amsterdam; from left to right: Queen Juliana of the Netherlands, King Bhumibol Adulyadej, Queen Sirikit and Prince Bernhard of Lippe-Biesterfeld, 25 October 1960

Date	Country	City	Host
8–16 February	Indonesia	Jakarta, Yogyakarta	President Sukarno
2–5 March	Burma	Yangon	President Win Maung
14 June – 15 July	United States	Honolulu, Los Angeles, Anaheim, Pittsburgh, Washington, D.C., Williamsburg, New York, Boston, Cambridge, Nashville, Denver, San Francisco	President Dwight D. Eisenhower
19–23 July	United Kingdom	London	Queen Elizabeth II
25 July – 2 August	West Germany	Bonn, Bochum, Bad Homburg, Nuremberg	President Heinrich Lübke
22–25 August	Portugal	Lisbon	President Américo Tomás
29–31 August	Switzerland	Bern, Lausanne	President Max Petitpierre
6–9 September	Denmark	Copenhagen, Roskilde	King Frederik IX
19–21 September	Norway	Oslo	King Olav V
23–25 September	Sweden	Stockholm	King Gustaf VI Adolf
28 September – 1 October	Italy	Rome	President Giovanni Gronchi
1 October	Vatican City	Vatican	Pope John XXIII
4–7 October	Belgium	Brussels, Bruges	King Baudouin
11–14 October	France	Paris, Versailles	President Charles de Gaulle
17–19 October	Luxembourg	Luxembourg	Grand Duchess Charlotte
24–27 October	Netherlands	Amsterdam, The Hague	Queen Juliana
3–8 November	Spain	Madrid, Seville	Caudillo Francisco Franco

== 1962 ==
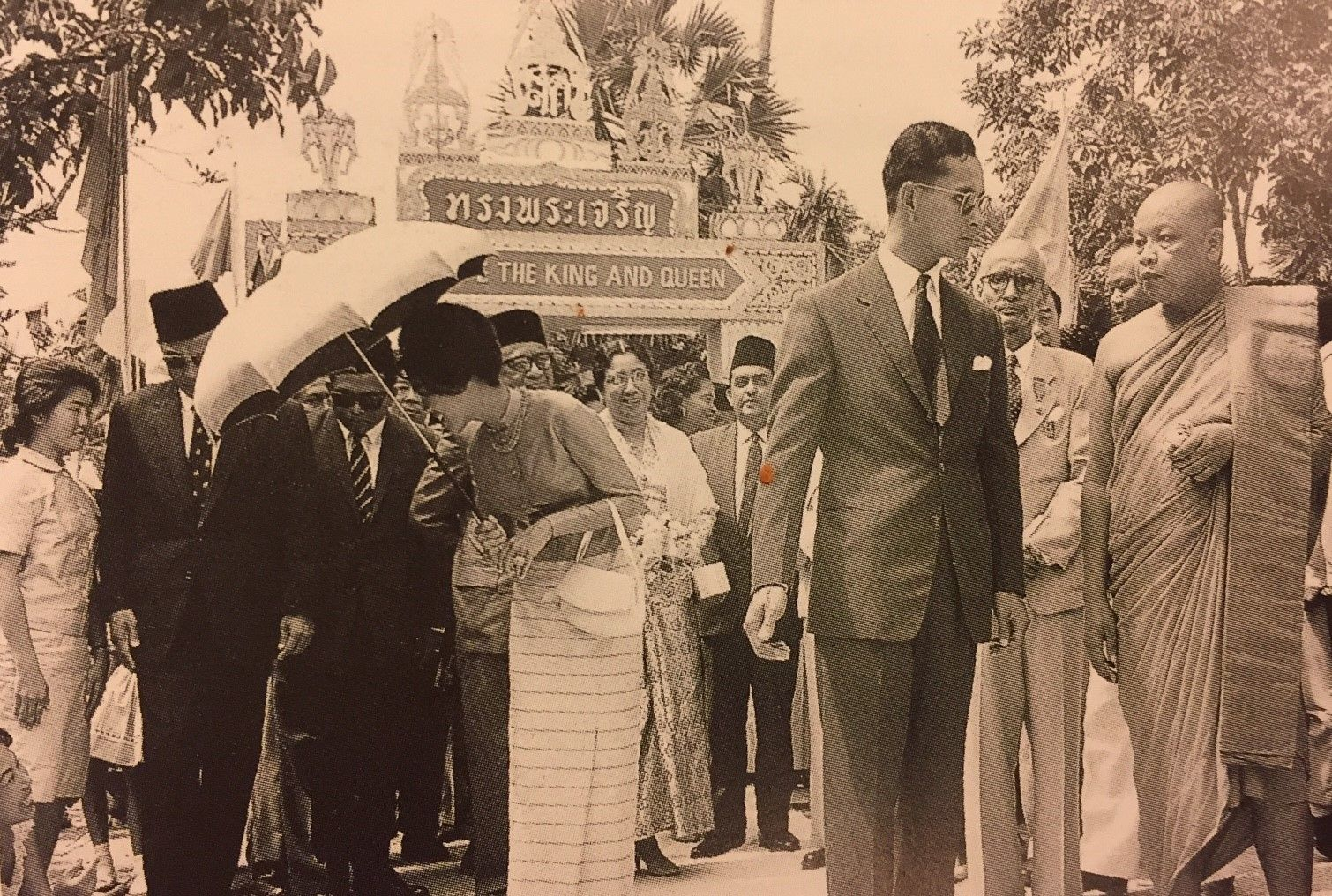
King Bhumibol Adulyadej and Queen Sirikit visiting Chetawan Buddhist Temple in Petaling Jaya, Selangor, Federation of Malaya during their state visit in 1962.

Date	Country	City	Host
11–22 March	Pakistan	Karachi	President Ayub Khan
20–27 June	Malaya	Kuala Lumpur, Penang, Selangor, Pahang	Yang di-Pertuan Agong Putra
18–26 August	New Zealand	Wellington, Auckland	Governor-General Charles Lyttelton
26 August – 12 September	Australia	Canberra, Sydney, Melbourne, Brisbane, Hobart, Adelaide, Perth	Governor-General William Sidney

== 1963 ==
Date	Country	City	Host
27 May – 5 June	Japan	Tokyo, Osaka, Kyoto, Nara, Nagoya, Gifu	Emperor Hirohito
5–8 June	Taiwan	Taipei, Taoyuan	President Chiang Kai-shek
9–14 July	Philippines	Manila, Baguio	President Diosdado Macapagal

== 1964 ==
Date	Country	City	Host
12 September – 6 October	Kingdom of Greece	Athens	King Constantine II
29 September – 5 December	Austria	Vienna	President Adolf Schärf

== 1966 ==
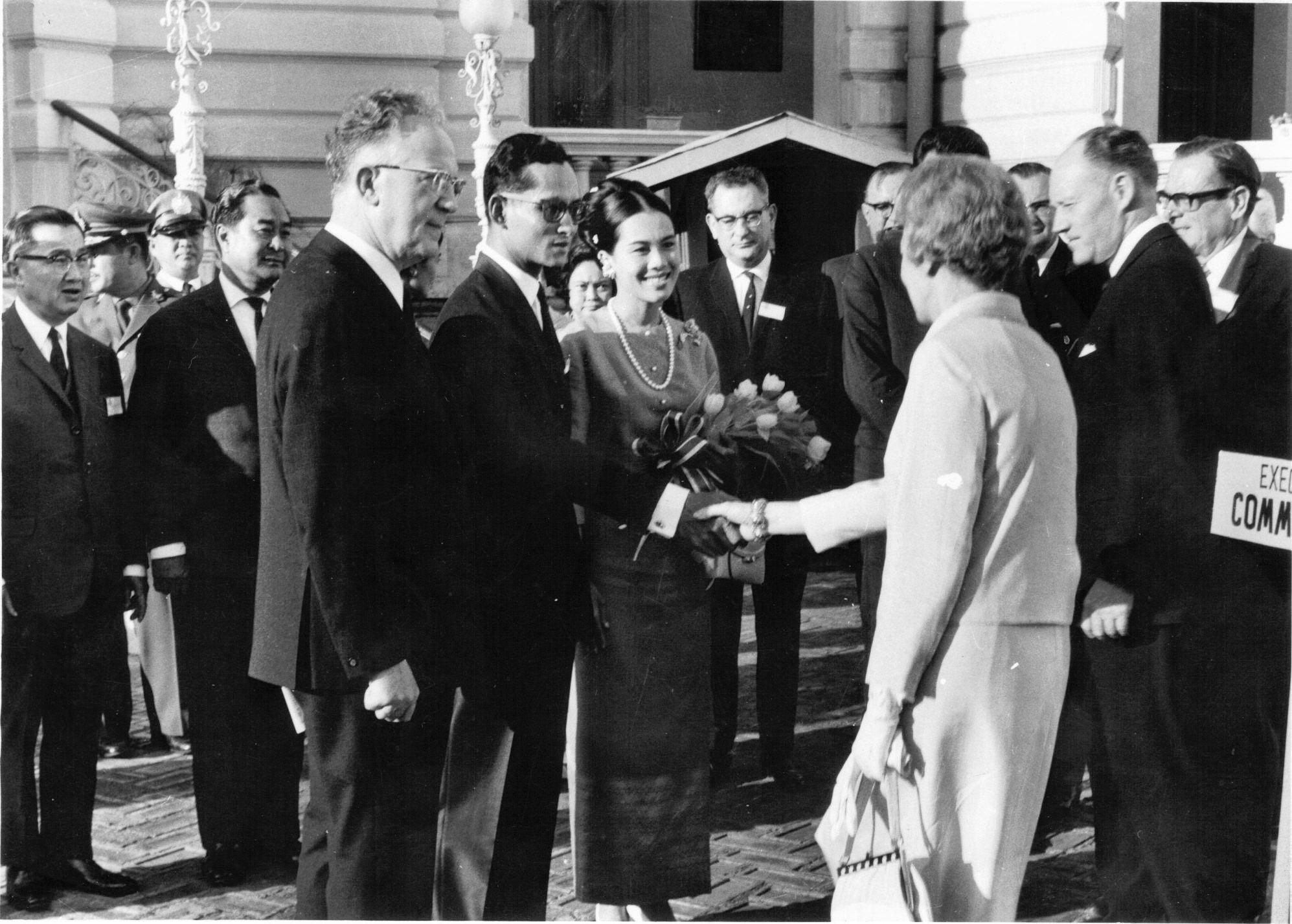
King Bhumibol Adulyadej greeting with Margarete Jonas at Hofburg, Vienna; from left to right: Austrian President Franz Jonas, King Bhumibol Adulyadej, Queen Sirikit and Margarete Jonas, 29 September 1966

Date	Country	City	Host
22–28 August	West Germany	Bonn	President Heinrich Lübke
29 September – 2 October	Austria	Vienna	President Franz Jonas

== 1967 ==
Date	Country	City	Host
23–30 April	Iran	Tehran, Shiraz, Isfahan	Emperor Mohammad Reza Pahlavi
6–20 June	United States	Washington, D.C., New York, Boston	President Lyndon B. Johnson
21–24 June	Canada	Ottawa	Governor-General Roland Michener

== 1994 ==
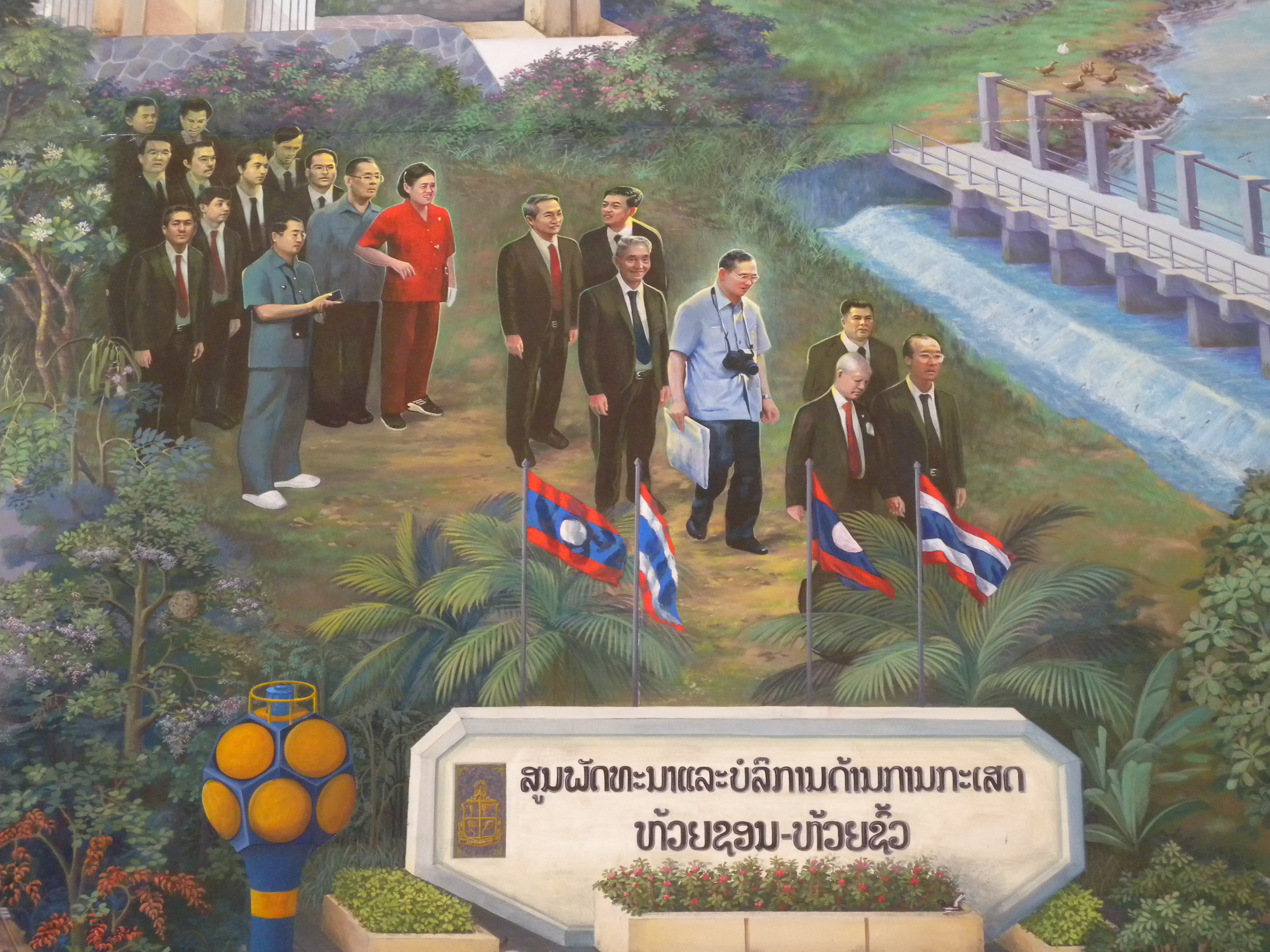
King Bhumibol Adulyadej and Lao President Nouhak Phoumsavanh opened the Huai Sonn-Huai Soie Agricultural Development and Service Centre (Km 22) in 8th April 1994, at Na Yang Village, Naxaythong District, Vientiane, Laos.

Date	Country	City	Host
8–9 April	Laos	Vientiane	President Nouhak Phoumsavanh
