= Mexico–Thailand relations =

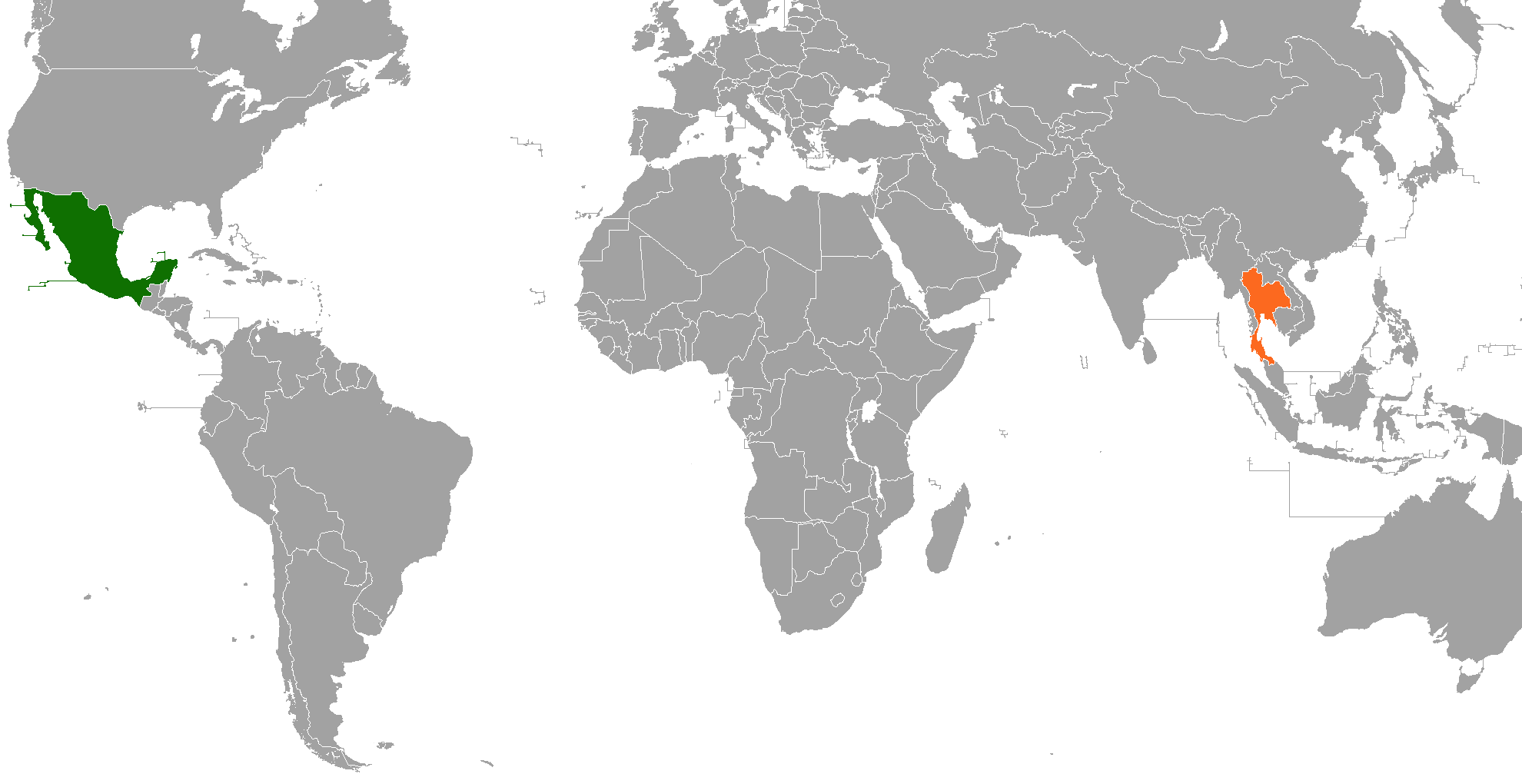

- Mexico: Thailand

The nations of Mexico and Thailand established diplomatic relations in 1975. Both nations are members of the Asia-Pacific Economic Cooperation, Forum of East Asia-Latin America Cooperation and the United Nations.

== History ==
The first contact between Mexico and Thailand took place in the late 16th century when Spanish ships sailed from Mexico (known then as New Spain) and traded silver, chili peppers and fruits to the Kingdom of Siam (present day Thailand) from its colony in the Philippines. Trade between both nations continued until Mexico obtained its independence from Spain in 1821. It would be another 150 years before both nations were to establish diplomatic relations. On 28 August 1975, Mexico and Thailand formally established diplomatic relations. In 1978, Thailand opened a resident embassy in Mexico City and in September 1989, Mexico reciprocated the gesture by opening a resident embassy in Bangkok.

In March 2002, Prime Minister Thaksin Shinawatra became the first Thai head-of-government to visit Mexico when he travelled to Monterrey to attend the Monterrey Consensus. He returned again in October of that same year to attend the APEC Summit in Los Cabos. In 2003, Mexican President Vicente Fox paid a visit to Thailand. On 23 May 2014, Mexico condemned the Thai coup d'état and asked for a peaceful resolution to the conflict.

In 2020, both nations celebrated their 45th anniversary of establishing diplomatic relations. In 2021, Mexico and Thailand held their IV Political Consultation Mechanism meeting which was conducted virtually.

== High-level visits ==
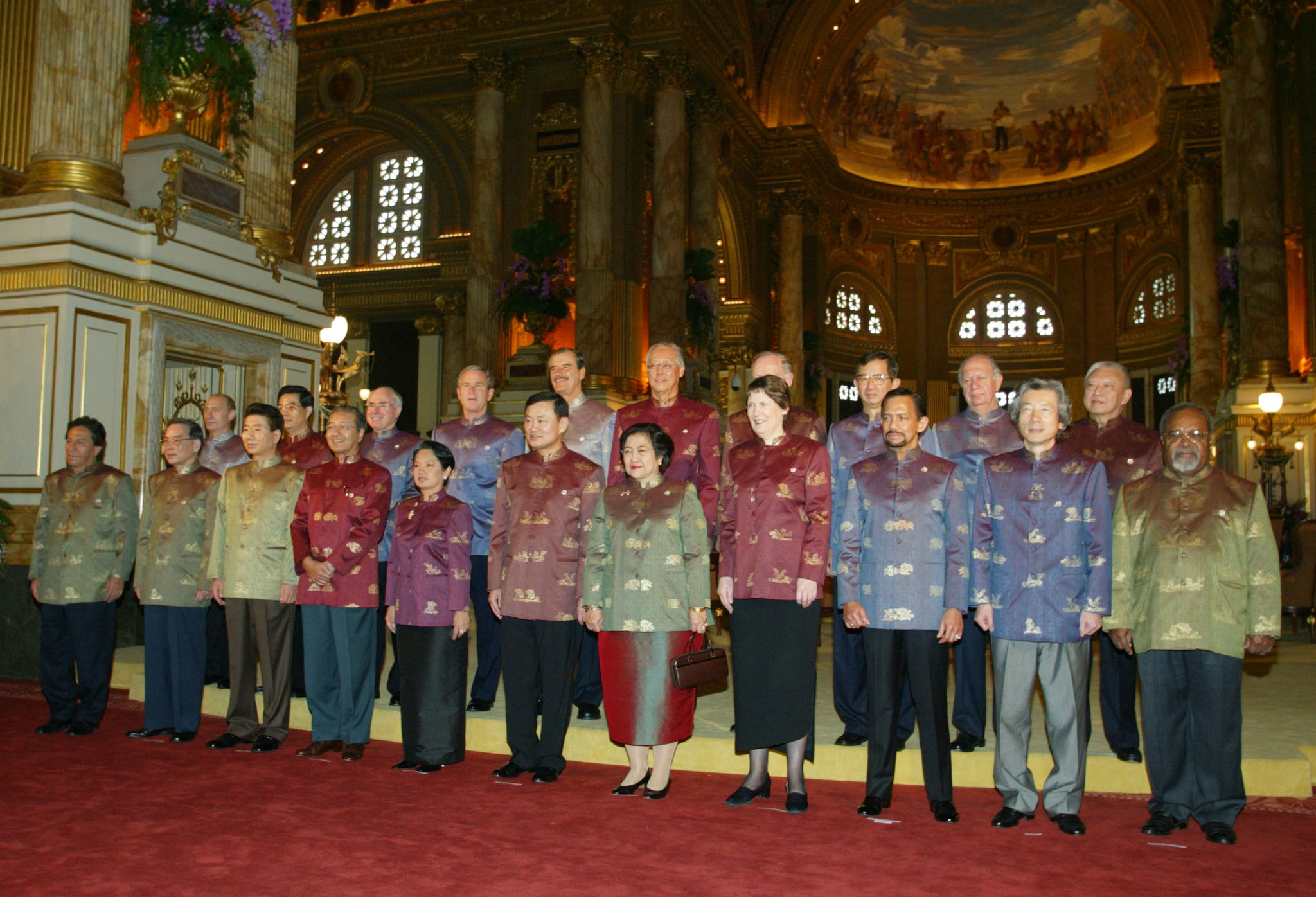
Mexican President Vicente Fox attending the APEC summit in Bangkok; 2003.

High-level visits from Mexico to Thailand

- Foreign Minister José Ángel Gurría (1996)
- Foreign Minister Jorge Castañeda Gutman (2002)
- President Vicente Fox (2003)
- Foreign Minister Patricia Espinosa Cantellano (2011)

High-level visits from Thailand to Mexico

- Deputy Prime Minister Amnuay Viravan (1996)
- Prince Vajiralongkorn (1996)
- Deputy Prime Minister Bhichai Rattakul (1998)
- Deputy Foreign Minister Sukhumbhand Paribatra (2000)
- Prime Minister Thaksin Shinawatra (March and October 2002)
- Deputy Prime Minister Somkid Jatusripitak (2002)
- Foreign Minister Surakiart Sathirathai (2002)

== Bilateral agreements ==
Both nations have signed several bilateral agreements such as an Agreement for Aviation and Transportation Cooperation (1991); Agreement on Visa Exemption for Diplomatic and Official Passports (1999); Agreement on Cultural and Educational Cooperation (2003) and a Memorandum of Understanding for the Establishment of a Mechanism of Consultation in Matters of Mutual Interest (2011).

Each year, since the establishment of diplomatic relations, the governments of both nations offer scholarships to citizens of each nation to study in Mexico and Thailand for graduate and/or diplomatic training.

== Trade relations ==
In 2023, two-way trade between both nations amounted to US$9 billion. The main export products from Mexico to Thailand are: telephones and mobile phones, motors and generators, machinery parts, parts and accessories for motor vehicles, scrap metal, zinc, medicine, vegetables, fish, chocolate and alcohol. The main export products from Thailand to Mexico are: data processing machines, electronic integrated circuits, telephones and mobile phones, motor vehicles, rubber tires, aluminum, clothing, seeds, rice, jewelry and precious metals. Thailand is Mexico's 3rd largest trading partner in the South Pacific region. Mexico is Thailand’s top trading partner in Latin America and the Caribbean.

== Resident diplomatic missions ==
- Mexico has an embassy in Bangkok.
- Thailand has an embassy in Mexico City.
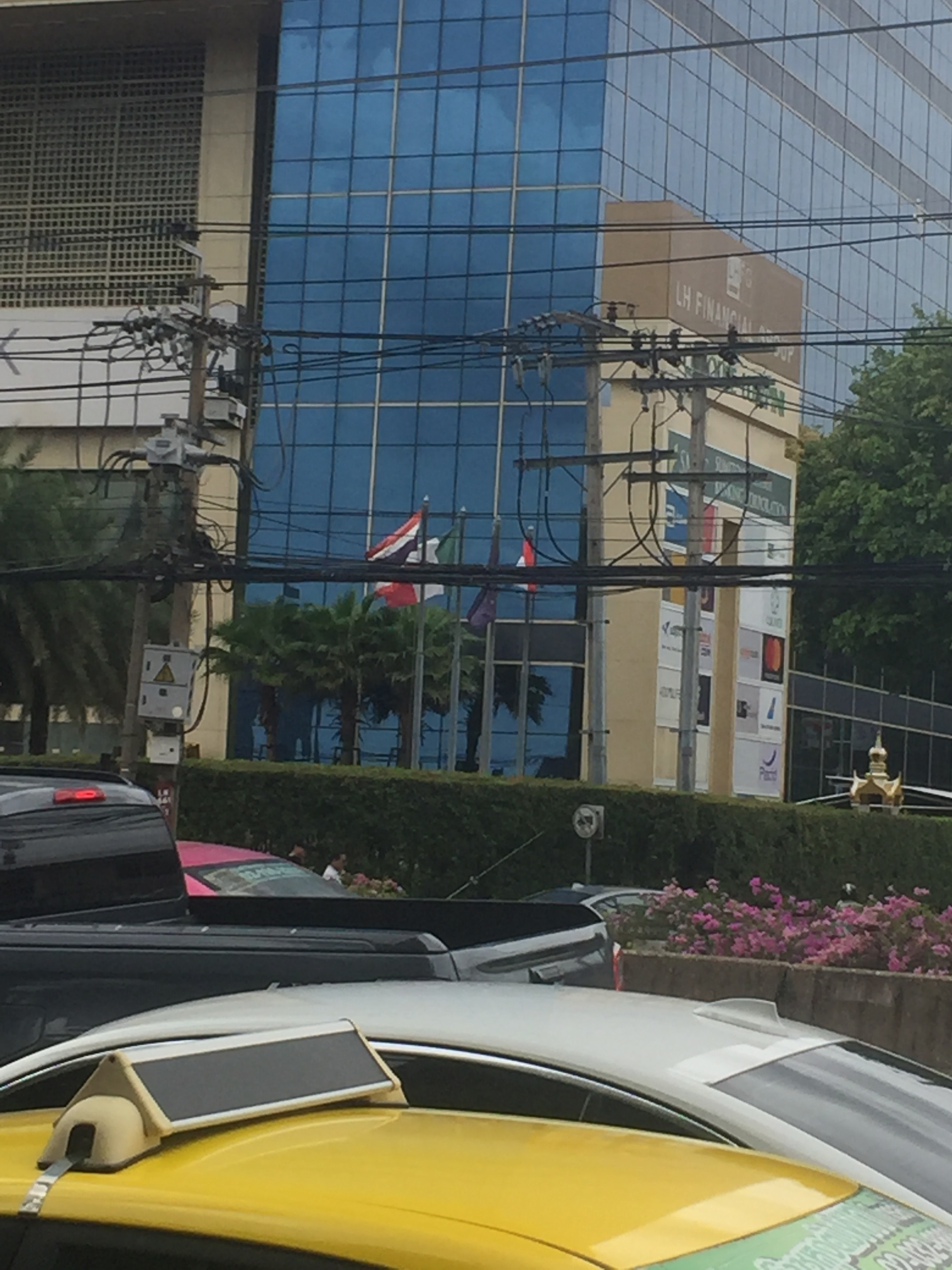
Building hosting the Embassy of Mexico in Bangkok

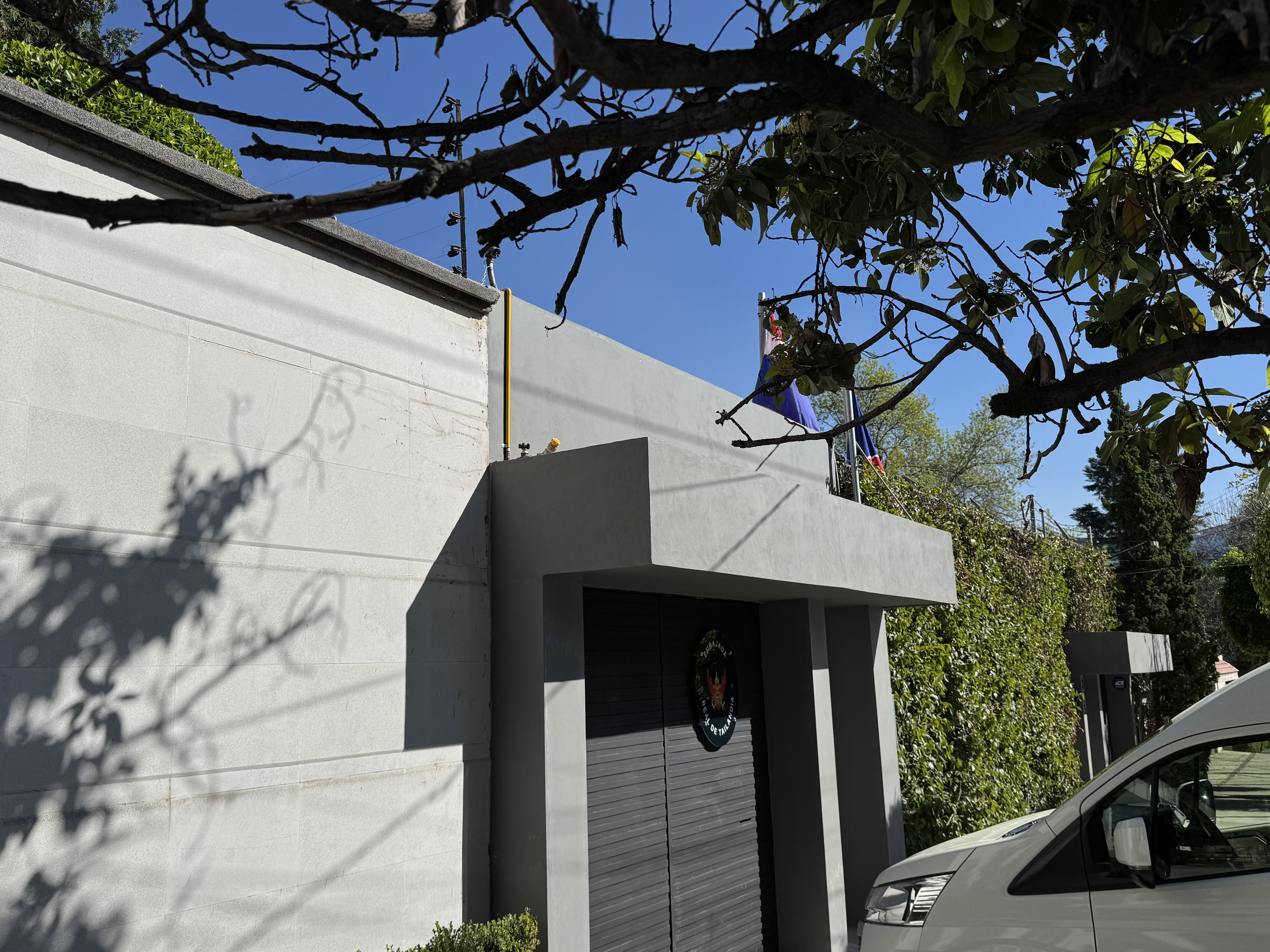
Embassy of Thailand in Mexico City

== See also ==
- Foreign relations of Mexico
- Foreign relations of Thailand
