= List of ambassadors of Thailand to Mexico =

Coordinates: 19.417164°N 99.227968°W

Ambassador of Thailand to Mexico
- Incumbent; Rooge Thammongkol since June 19, 2024
- Inaugural holder: Sukho Suwansiri
- Formation: November 9, 1978

The Thai Ambassador in Mexico City is the official representative of the Government in Bangkok to the Government of Mexico and is concurrently accredited in Tegucigalpa, San Salvador, Managua, San José, Costa Rica, Havana and Guatemala City.

== List of representatives ==
Diplomatic agreement/designated/Diplomatic accreditation	Ambassador	Observations	List of prime ministers of Thailand	List of heads of state of Mexico	Term end	
August 28, 1975		The governments in Mexico City and Bangkok established diplomatic relations.	Seni Pramoj	Luis Echeverría Álvarez		
1978		The Thai embassy in Mexico City was opened.	Kriangsak Chomanan	José López Portillo		
November 9, 1978	Sukho Suwansiri		Kriangsak Chomanan	José López Portillo	1981	
1982	Vudhi Chuchom		Prem Tinsulanonda	José López Portillo	1985	
February 11, 1985	Sirajaya Buddhi-Baedya	Sirajaya Buddhi-Baedye In 1988 he was Thai Ambassador to Nepal	Prem Tinsulanonda	Miguel de la Madrid Hurtado	1987	
1988	Chetanar Jotisalikorn		Prem Tinsulanonda	Miguel de la Madrid Hurtado	1990	
September 1, 1989		Thailand opened a resident embassy in Mexico City.	Chatichai Choonhavan	Carlos Salinas de Gortari		
1990	Orachun Tanaphong	อรชุน ต นะ พง ษ์ (*1932): In 1944 he was a 12-year old, when he became a courier and carried medicines and messages to Allied POWs held in a temple compound in Northern Thailand.; In 1975 he was Charge de Affairs of the Thai Ambassador to Saudi Arabia.; From to 1982 he was Thai Ambassador to Serbia.; From 1982 to 1986 he was Thai Ambassador to China.; From 1986 to 1992 he was Thai Ambassador to Portugal replacingn Ambassador Sanan Plang prayun	Chatichai Choonhavan	Carlos Salinas de Gortari	1992	
1992	Sunai Bunyasiriphant		Chuan Leekpai	Carlos Salinas de Gortari	1994	
1994	Krabuan Pornsobhon		Chuan Leekpai	Ernesto Zedillo Ponce de León	1996	
1997	Abinant Na Ranong	In 1992 he was Thai Ambassador to the Netherlands	Chuan Leekpai	Ernesto Zedillo Ponce de León	2000	
2001	Plernpit Potiganond	Ambassadrice 1986 she was Mme Plernpit Potiganond a été nommée premier secrétaire le 1er décembre 1985, en remplacement de M. Visoot at the Mission next to the UNESCO.	Thaksin Shinawatra	Vicente Fox	2004	
2005	Ravee Hongsaprabhas	From 1998 to 2004 he was Thai Ambassadaor to the Philippines	Thaksin Shinawatra	Vicente Fox	2008	
2009	Charuwan Thiemthad		Abhisit Vejjajiva	Felipe Calderón	2010	
2011	Suvat Chirapant		Yingluck Shinawatra	Felipe Calderón	2012	
February 14, 2013	Chirachai Punkrasin		Yingluck Shinawatra	Enrique Peña Nieto	2015	
February 17, 2015	Surasak Chuasukonthip	was the Thai Ambassador to Kuwait.	Prayut Chan-o-cha	Enrique Peña Nieto	2016	
April 11, 2017	Rommanee Kananurak	Embajadora Extraordinaria y Plenipotenciaria	Prayut Chan-o-cha	Enrique Peña Nieto	2019	
February 11, 2021	Paisan Rupanichkij	ไพศาล หรูพาณิชย์กิจ	Concurrently accredited to Belize, Cuba and Nicaragua; later Deputy Permanent Secretary at the Ministry of Foreign Affairs	Prayut Chan-o-cha	Andrés Manuel López Obrador	2024
June 19, 2024	Rooge Thammongkol	รุจ ธรรมมงคล	Presented credentials to President Andrés Manuel López Obrador	Srettha Thavisin	Andrés Manuel López Obrador	

- Mexico–Thailand relations
