= Oman–Thailand relations =

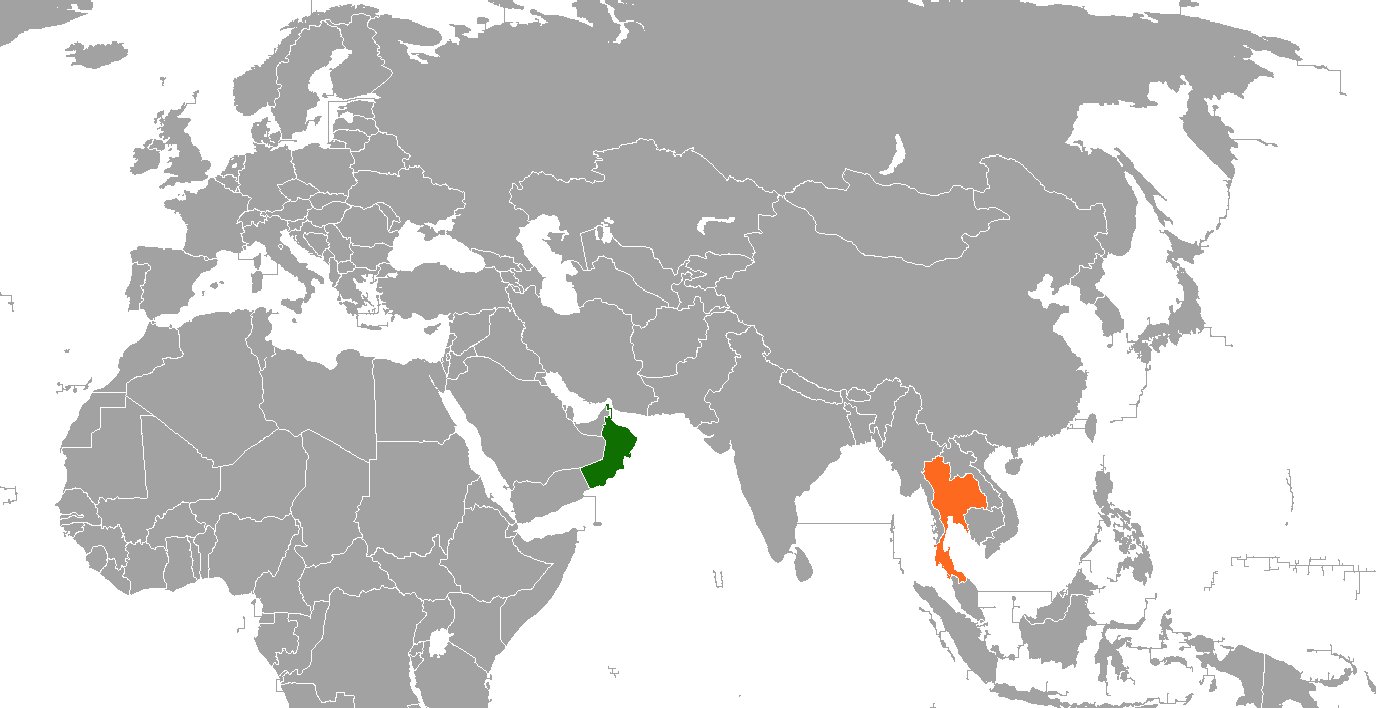

- Oman: Thailand

Oman–Thailand relations are the bilateral relations between Oman and Thailand.

== History ==
While the two countries did not have too many ancient links, Ayutthaya Kingdom in the 16th century had been one of the most active trade partners, including Arab traders. Omani traders, as part of Arab traders, developed healthy tie with the Siamese and even facilitated to the establishment of a Persian/Arab Muslim community that would remain in Thailand for centuries. This resulted with both Oman and Thailand became commonly prosperous in their medieval histories, respectively, attracted other Muslim traders to Thailand as well.

Oman and Thailand would soon establish relations with the ascend of Qaboos bin Said al Said as Sultan of Oman in 1980.

Being two similar royal states, Oman and Thailand have sought to take advantage of this link. Since the 1980s, trade between the two countries increased. Two countries have engaged in political consultation since 2017.

Thailand is one of the most popular tourist destinations for Omanis outside the Gulf states, especially medical tourism.

== Transport ==
Oman Air operates direct flights between Muscat and Bangkok, and Muscat and Phuket.

== Diplomatic missions ==
- Oman has an embassy in Bangkok.
- Thailand has an embassy in Muscat.
