= Thailand Trade and Economic Office, Taipei =

Representative office of Thailand in the Republic of China

Thailand Trade and Economic Office, Taipei สำนักงานการค้าและเศรษฐกิจไทย ณ ไทเป
- 駐臺北泰國貿易經濟辦事處

Agency overview
- Formed: 1976 (as Thai Airways International Ltd. Office); 1992 (as Thailand Trade and Economic Office)
- Jurisdiction: Thailand
- Headquarters: Taipei, Taiwan
- Agency executive: Narong Boonsatheanwong, Representative
- Website: Thailand Trade and Economic Office (Taipei)

The Thailand Trade and Economic Office, Taipei (Thai: สำนักงานการค้าและเศรษฐกิจไทย ณ ไทเป; RTGS: Samnakngan Kankha lae Setthakit Thai Na Thaipe; Chinese: 駐臺北泰國貿易經濟辦事處) is the representative office of Thailand in Taiwan, functioning as a de facto embassy in the absence of diplomatic relations.

It was first established in February 1976 as the Thai Airways International Ltd. Office, before adopting its present name in September 1992. Prior to the establishment of diplomatic relations with the People's Republic of China in 1975, Thailand was represented by the Royal Thai Embassy in Taipei.

Its counterpart body in Thailand is the Taipei Economic and Cultural Office in Thailand in Bangkok.

== See also ==
- List of diplomatic missions in Taiwan
- List of diplomatic missions of Thailand
