= G20 developing nations =

Bloc of developing nations

- Logo

- Headquarters: New Delhi, India
- Type: Trade bloc
- Member states: 23 countries: Argentina; Bolivia; Brazil; Chile; China; Cuba; Ecuador; Egypt; Guatemala; India; Indonesia; Mexico; Nigeria; Pakistan; Paraguay; Peru; Philippines; South Africa; Tanzania; Thailand; Uruguay; Venezuela; Zimbabwe
- Establishment: 20 August 2003

The G20 developing nations (and, occasionally, the G21, G23 or G20+) is a bloc of developing nations established on 20 August 2003. Distinct and separate from the G20 major economies, the group emerged at the 5th Ministerial WTO conference, held in Cancún, Mexico, from 10 September to 14 September 2003. The group accounted for 60% of the world's population, 70% of its farmers and 26% of world’s agricultural exports.

== History ==
Its origins date back to June 2003, when foreign ministers from Brazil, India and South Africa signed a declaration known as the Brasilia Declaration, on June 6, 2003. in which they stated that "major trading partners are still moved by protectionist concerns in their countries’ less competitive sectors [...] and emphasized how important it is that the results of the current round of trade negotiations provide especially for the reversal of protectionist policies and trade-distorting practices [...] Furthermore, Brazil, India and South Africa decided to articulate their initiatives of trade liberalization".

Nonetheless, the "official" appearance of the group occurred as a response to a text released on 13 August 2003 by the European Communities (EC) and the United States with a common proposal on agriculture for the Cancún Ministerial. On 20 August 2003 a document signed by twenty countries and re-issued as a Cancún Ministerial document on 4 September proposed an alternative framework to that of the EC and the US on agriculture for the Cancún Meeting. This document marked the establishment of the group. The original group of signatories of the 20 August 2003 document went through many changes, being known as such different names as the G-21 or the G-22. The title G-20 was finally chosen, in honor of the date of the group's establishment.

Since its creation, the group had a fluctuating membership. Previous members include: Colombia; Costa Rica; El Salvador; and Turkey. In December 2017, the group had 23 members.

== See also ==
- G20
- BRICS
