= List of Australian National University people =

This is an incomplete list of Australian National University people, including alumni and staff.

== Alumni ==
=== Academia ===
- Robert Addo-Fening, historian and academic
- Des Ball, security specialist and ANU Professor
- Andrew Barker, British classicist
- Joanna Bourke, historian and academic
- Rosi Braidotti, feminist
- Bob Brissenden, poet, novelist, critic and academic
- Harold Brookfield, academic
- Verity Burgmann, academic
- Dipesh Chakrabarty, historian and theorist
- Yang Hi Choe-Wall, Koreanist
- Peter Coutts, archaeologist
- Glyn Davis, Vice-Chancellor of the University of Melbourne 2005-2018, interim Vice-Chancellor since 2026
- John Deeble, architect of Medicare
- Peter Drysdale, economist
- Alan Dupont, academic
- Stevan Eldred-Grigg, historian and novelist
- Nicholas Evans, linguist
- Alan Finkel, historian
- John Frow, academic
- Bill Gammage, historian
- Ross Garnaut, economist
- Geoffrey Garrett, political scientist, dean of the Wharton School of the University of Pennsylvania
- Alan Gilbert, Vice Chancellor of the University of Melbourne 1996–2004; Vice Chancellor of the University of Manchester 2004–2010
- Malcolm Gillies, Vice-Chancellor of London Metropolitan University 2009-2014
- Nicholas Gruen, economist
- William Hale, academic
- Allan Hawke, diplomat and ANU Chancellor
- Chris Heyde, probabilist
- Helen Hoang, economist and author
- Brij Lal, historian
- Marcia Langton, anthropologist (BA, ANU), geographer (PhD, Maquarie)
- Donald Laycock, linguist
- Michael McRobbie, President of Indiana University 2007-2021
- Toby Miller, academic
- David Nash, linguist
- Harjot Oberoi, academic
- Patrick O'Farrell, historian
- Diane Pearson, Professor in Environmental Management
- John Quiggin, economist
- Margaret Reeson, historian
- Ralph Regenvanu, anthropologist, artist and politician
- Elizabeth Anne Reid, academic
- Leslie Lloyd Robson, historian
- Michael Roe, historian
- Jessa Rogers, Aboriginal educator
- Leonie Sandercock, academic
- Carmel Schrire, anthropologist
- Bernard Smith, art historian
- Clem Tisdell, economist
- Hrvoje Tkalčić, geophysicist
- Donald Tuzin, social anthropologist
- Tarisi Vunidilo, Fijian archaeologist and curator
- Rolf Zinkernagel, Nobel Prize winning medical researcher
- Pamela Gutman, Burmese art historian

=== Business ===
- Graham Tuckwell, investor and founder of ETF Securities, an Australian asset management firm
- Rob Scott, CEO of Wesfarmers
- Elizabeth Bryan, business executive and former CEO of Deutsche Asset Management
- John Bryant, CEO of Kellogg's
- Cheong Choong Kong, former CEO of Singapore Airlines and current Chairman of OCBC Bank
- Swarnim Wagle, economist from Nepal, worked in World Bank and Asian Development Bank, former vice chairman of National Planning Commission of Nepal
- Chris Corrigan, former CEO of Patrick Corporation and current Chairman of Qube Holdings
- Sam Prince, founder of Zambrero, one of the largest Australian fast food restaurant franchise serving Mexican cuisine
- Vicki Brady, CEO of Telstra

=== Government ===
==== Politicians ====
===== Prime Ministers of Australia =====
- Bob Hawke, Prime Minister of Australia 1983–1991 (attended but did not graduate)
- Kevin Rudd, Prime Minister of Australia 2007–2010, 2013

===== Other federal politicians =====
- Phil Barresi, Member of the Australian House of Representatives 1996–2007
- Kim Beazley Sr, Member of the Australian House of Representatives 1945–1977; Federal Minister 1972–1975
- Bob Catley, Member of the Australian House of Representatives 1990–1993
- Barry Cohen, Member of the Australian House of Representatives 1969–1990
- Stephen Conroy, Member of the Australian Senate since 2006; Federal Minister 2007–2013
- Craig Emerson, Member of the Australian House of Representatives since 1998; Federal Minister 2007–2013
- Chris Gallus, Member of the Australian House of Representatives 1990–2004
- Concetta Fierravanti-Wells, Member of the Australian Senate 2005-2022
- Peter Garrett, Member of the Australian House of Representatives since 2004; Federal Minister 2007–2013
- Gary Gray, Member of the Australian House of Representatives since 2007; Federal Minister since 2010–2013
- Alan Griffin, Member of the Australian House of Representatives since 1993; Federal Minister 2007–2010
- Dame Margaret Guilfoyle, Member of the Australian Senate 1971–1987
- Harry Jenkins, Member of the Australian House of Representatives since 1986; Speaker of the House 2008–2011
- Michael Keenan, Member of the Australian House of Representatives 2004-2019
- John Kerin, Member of the Australian House of Representatives 1972–1993; Federal Minister 1983–1993
- Catherine King, Member of the Australian House of Representatives since 2001; Federal Minister 2013
- Joe Ludwig, Member of the Australian Senate 1999-2016; Federal Minister 2007–2013
- Brett Mason, Member of the Australian Senate 1999-2015
- Sam Mostyn, Governor General of Australia since 2024
- Nick Minchin, Member of the Australian Senate 1993–2011; Federal Minister 1997–2007
- Susan Ryan, Member of the Australian Senate 1975–1988
- Zed Seselja, Member of the Australian Senate 2013-2022
- Warwick Smith, Member of the Australian House of Representatives 1984–1998; Federal Minister 1996–1998
- Warren Snowdon, Member of the Australian House of Representatives 1987-2022; Federal Minister 2007–2013
- Alex Somlyay, Member of the Australian House of Representatives 1990–2013; Federal Minister 1997–1998
- Peter White, Member of the Australian House of Representatives 1981–1990

==== State Premiers and territory Chief Ministers ====
===== State Premiers =====
- Jeff Kennett, Premier of Victoria 1992–1999 (attended but did not graduate)
- Barry O'Farrell, Premier of New South Wales 2011–2014

===== Territory Chief Ministers =====
- Andrew Barr, Chief Minister of the Australian Capital Territory since 2014
- Katy Gallagher, Chief Minister of the Australian Capital Territory 2011–2014
- Gary Humphries, Chief Minister of the Australian Capital Territory 2000–2001
- Jon Stanhope, Chief Minister of the Australian Capital Territory 2001–2011
- Shane Stone, Chief Minister of the Northern Territory 1995–1999

===== Other State and territory politicians =====
- Michael Pettersson, Member of the Australian Capital Territory Legislative Assembly since 2016
- Alistair Coe, ACT Opposition Leader, and Member of the Australian Capital Territory Legislative Assembly 2008-2021
- Roslyn Dundas, Member of the Australian Capital Territory Legislative Assembly 2001–2004
- John Hannaford, Member of the New South Wales Legislative Council 1984–2000; State Minister 1990–1995
- Kate Jones, Member of the Legislative Assembly of Queensland 2007–2012; State Minister 2009–2011
- Andrew McIntosh, Member of the Victorian Legislative Assembly 1999-2014
- Michael Moore, Member of the Australian Capital Territory Legislative Assembly 1989–2001
- Shane Rattenbury, Member of the Australian Capital Territory Legislative Assembly since 2008; Speaker of the Assembly 2008–2012
- Chris Steel, Member of the Australian Capital Territory Legislative Assembly since 2016
- Zed Seselja, Member of the Australian Capital Territory Legislative Assembly since 2004; Leader of the Opposition 2007–2013
- Andrew Tink, Member of the New South Wales Legislative Council 1988–2007
- Michael Yabsley, Member of the New South Wales Legislative Council 1984–1994; State Minister 1988–1992

==== Civil servants ====
- Glenys Beauchamp, Secretary of the Department of Industry since 2013
- Peter Boxall, Secretary of the Department of Finance 1997–2002
- Stephen Brady, Official Secretary to the Governor-General of Australia since 2008
- Blair Comley, Secretary of the Department of Climate Change and Energy Efficiency 2011–2013
- Peta Credlin, Chief of Staff to Prime Minister Tony Abbott 2013–2015
- Gordon de Brouwer, Public Service Commissioner 2023–2026; Chancellor, Australian National University since 2026
- Paul Dibb, Director of the Joint Intelligence Organisation 1986–1988 and Deputy Secretary for Strategy and Intelligence of the Department of Defence 1988–1991
- Bernie Fraser, Secretary of the Australian Treasury 1984–1989
- Paul Grimes, Secretary of the Department of Agriculture 2013-2015
- Jane Halton, Secretary of the Department of Health (Australia) since 2001
- Stuart Hamilton, Secretary of the Department of Environment 1993–1996
- Allan Hawke, Secretary of the Department of Defence 1999–2002
- Chris Higgins, Secretary of the Australian Treasury 1989–1990
- Michael Keating, Secretary of the Department of the Prime Minister & Cabinet 1991–1996
- Renée Leon, Secretary of the Department of Employment since 2013
- Bill McLennan, Head of the Australian Bureau of Statistics 1995–2000
- Simon Overland, Chief Commissioner of Victoria Police 2009–2011
- Martin Parkinson, Secretary of the Australian Treasury 2011–2014
- Lisa Paul, Secretary of the Department of Education (Australia) since 2004
- Finn Pratt, Secretary of the Department of Social Services since 2009
- Don Russell, Secretary of the Department of Industry 2011–2013
- Patricia Scott, Secretary of the Department of Communications 2007–2009
- Rod Sims, Chairman of the Australian Competition & Consumer Commission 2011-2022
- Dennis Trewin, Head of the Australian Bureau of Statistics 2000–2007
- Nick Warner, Director-General of the Australian Secret Intelligence Service

===== Diplomats =====
- Richard Butler, Permanent Representative of Australia to the United Nations 1992–1996
- Iftekhar Ahmed Chowdhury, Bangladeshi Ambassador to the United Nations 2001–2007; Foreign Minister (2007–2009); Principal Research Fellow, Institute of South Asian Studies [ISAS], National University of Singapore
- Martin Indyk, United States Ambassador to Israel 1995–1997 and 2000–2001
- Sione Ngongo Kioa, Tongan Ambassador to 10 countries
- Cristelle Pratt, Assistant Secretary-General for the Environment and Climate Action, Organisation of African, Caribbean and Pacific States
- Feleti Teo, Secretary General of the Pacific Islands Forum Secretariat 2008
- Peter Woolcott, former Australian Ambassador to Italy
- Rathakit Manathat, former Thai Ambassador to China

===== United Nations officials =====
- Robert Piper, Regional Humanitarian Coordinator for the Sahel, with the rank of United Nations Assistant Secretary General; founding member of the Doug Anthony Allstars
- Mai Sato, United Nations Special Rapporteur on human rights in Iran

===== Foreign officials =====
- Chirayu Isarangkun Na Ayuthaya, Director of the Crown Property Bureau of Thailand (1987–2018) and the Chief Economic Advisor in the Privy Council of H.M. The King of Thailand (2018–present)
- Chatib Basri, Finance Minister in the Indonesian Government 2013–2014
- Don Brash, Leader of the Opposition in New Zealand 2003–2006, Governor of the Reserve Bank of New Zealand 1988–2002
- Patricia Hewitt, Member of the House of Commons of the United Kingdom 1997–2010; British Minister 2001–2007
- Carlos Jarque, Mexican Government Minister 1995–2000
- Prince Katsura, Member of the Imperial House of Japan
- Gordon Darcy Lilo, Prime Minister of the Solomon Islands 2011-2014
- Marty Natalegawa, Foreign Minister of Indonesia 2009–2014
- Mari Pangestu, Minister in the Indonesian Government since 2004
- Kuini Speed, Deputy Prime Minister of Fiji 1999–2000
- Teuea Toatu, the Vice-President and Minister for Finance & Economic Development of Kiribati since 2019 and 2016, respectively.
- Damdin Tsogtbaatar, Foreign Minister of Mongolia since 2017
- Jian Yang, Member of the House of Representatives of New Zealand since 2011
- Tupoutoʻa ʻUlukalala, the Crown Prince of Tonga since 2012

=== Law ===
==== Justices of the High Court of Australia ====
- Stephen Gageler, Chief Justice of Australia since 2023; Justice of the High Court of Australia since 2012; Solicitor-General of Australia 2008–2012
- Geoffrey Nettle, Justice of the High Court of Australia 2015–2020

==== Judges of the Federal Court of Australia ====
- Tony Whitlam, Judge of the Federal Court of Australia 1993–2005

==== Judges of the Supreme Courts of Australian states and territories ====
- Peter Buchanan, Judge of the Supreme Court of Victoria since 1997
- Terence Higgins, Chief Justice of the Supreme Court of the Australian Capital Territory since 2003
- Catherine Holmes, Judge of the Supreme Court of Queensland since 2000
- Geoffrey Nettle, Judge of the Supreme Court of Victoria since 2002
- Janine Pritchard, Judge of the Supreme Court of Western Australia since 2010

==== President of the Chamber of the Supreme Administrative Court of Thailand ====
- Rathakit Manathat, President of the Chamber of the Supreme Administrative Court of Thailand since 2022

==== Federal Magistrates of Australia ====
- John Pascoe, Chief Federal Magistrate of Australia since 2004

==== Legal practitioners ====
- Tupou Draunidalo, Fijian Lawyer
- Jennifer Robinson, human rights and WikiLeaks lawyer; Rhodes Scholar 2006

==== Law professors ====
- George Williams, Vice Chancellor at Western Sydney University; constitutional law expert
- Megan Davis, Scientia Professor at the UNSW Faculty of Law; constitutional law expert

=== Humanities ===
==== Arts ====
- David Bradbury, filmmaker
- Michael Brand, art scholar
- Ronny Chieng, comedian
- Jim Cotter, composer
- Jessica Cottis, conductor
- Ian Cresswell, composer
- Will Firth, translator
- Hannah Gadsby, comedian
- Alister Grierson, director and scriptwriter
- Emma Holland, comedian
- Geoffrey Lancaster, classical pianist and conductor
- Henry Nixon, actor
- Tim Rogers, musician
- Richard Roxburgh, actor
- Nagita Slavina, Indonesian actress
- Adam Spreadbury-Maher, theatre director and producer
- Katia Tiutiunnik, composer
- Sally Whitwell, ARIA Award-winning pianist

==== Journalism and media ====
- Bettina Arndt, journalist
- Cynthia Banham, journalist and academic
- Alice T. Days, documentary filmmaker
- Toby Hendy, science communicator and YouTuber
- Ann Jones, environmental journalist, radio and television presenter
- Paul McDermott, comedian and television host
- Stephen Rice, journalist
- Peter Thompson, journalist

==== Literature, writing and poetry ====
- Don Aitkin, writer
- Diane Bell, anthropologist, author
- Michael Byrne, poet
- Kevin Hart, poet and literary critic
- Matussin Omar, writer
- Debra Oswald, scriptwriter
- Guy Pearse, author
- Gayla Reid, writer
- Pierre Ryckmans, writer, translator, sinologist
- David Vernon, writer and sceptic
- Gerard Windsor, author and literary critic
- Vanessa Woods, author
- Shahnon Ahmad, prose writer, Malaysian National Laureate

=== Military ===
- Vice Admiral Ray Griggs, Vice Chief of the Defence Force

=== Sciences ===
==== Astronomy ====
- Jessie Christiansen, exoplanetologist
- Don VandenBerg, astronomer

==== Biology ====
- Nerilie Abram, climate scientist
- Leanne Armand, marine scientist
- Ian Brooker, botanist
- Kirsten Parris, urban ecologist
- Susanne von Caemmerer, plant physiologist

==== Chemistry ====
- John Shine, biochemist
- Roland Stocker, biochemist
- G. S. R. Subba Rao, bio-organic chemist

==== Mathematics ====
- John Coates, mathematician
- Michael Cowling, mathematician
- Peter Hall, statistician
- Adrian Pagan, econometrician
- Charles E. M. Pearce, mathematician

==== Medicine ====
- Colin Butler, physician and humanitarian
- Anne Castles, cognitive scientist of reading and language
- Sir William Liley, perinatal physiologist
- Adrian Liston, immunologist
- Rodolfo Llinás, neuroscientist
- Robert Webster, virologist

==== Physics ====
- Rodney Jory, physicist
- Ross H. McKenzie, physicist
- Keith Nugent, physicist

=== Sport ===
- William Cheung, kung fu practitioner
- David Gallop, CEO of the Football Federation Australia
- Lincoln Hall, mountain climber
- Tal Karp (born 1981), female Australian football (soccer) player
- Stephen Larkham, rugby player, World Cup winner
- Tim Macartney-Snape, mountaineer

=== Other ===
- Brian George Farran, bishop
- Bettina Gorton, wife of John Gorton, Prime Minister of Australia (1968–71)
- James Popple, CEO of the Law Council of Australia
- Naomi Rono, World Bank advisor
- Teretia Tokam, women's rights activist
- Andrew Tridgell, computer programmer
- Barbara Vernon, birth activist
- Tom Worthington, computer programmer

== Faculty ==
Notable past and current faculty members include:

- Anthony Irvine Adams, public health physician
- Patrick Atiyah, English barrister and legal writer
- Arthur Llewellyn Basham, South Asian historian
- Michael Barnsley, mathematician and entrepreneur
- Bronwyn Parry, Dean of the College of Arts and Social Sciences
- Larissa Behrendt, academic; Professor of Indigenous Research
- Coral Bell, Senior Research Fellow in International Relations
- David Bensusan-Butt, economist
- Arthur Birch, organic chemist
- Boediono, Indonesian Vice President
- Richard P. Brent, mathematical scientist
- Miroslav Bukovsky, composer
- Sydney James Butlin, economist, historian
- Chilla Bulbeck, women's studies
- Hedley Bull, Professor of International Relations
- Harvey Raymond Butcher, astronomer
- John Caldwell, demographer
- Yang Hi Choe-Wall, Koreanist
- Manning Clark, historian
- John Coates, mathematician
- John Cockcroft, Nobel Prize-winning nuclear physicist, former chancellor
- H. C. Coombs, economist and public servant
- David P. Craig, research chemist
- Gavan Daws, historian and writer
- Rafe de Crespigny, sinologist
- Robert Dessaix, novelist and essayist
- Paul Dibb, Professor of Strategic Studies and Head of the Strategic and Defence Studies Centre
- Peter C. Doherty, Nobel Prize-winning immunologist
- Thomas K. Donaldson, mathematician
- Robert M. Douglas, medical researcher
- Sir John Eccles, Nobel Prize-winning neurophysiologist
- Fred Emery, social scientist
- Kep Enderby, lawyer and politician
- Denis Evans, physicist and chemist
- Frank Fenner, scientist
- C. P. Fitzgerald, historian
- Michael Flood, sociologist
- Howard Florey, Nobel Prize-winning medical researcher, former chancellor
- Derek Freeman, anthropologist
- Robert Gilbert, polymer chemist
- Peter Godfrey-Smith, philosopher and author of the book Other Minds
- Colin Groves, anthropologist
- Fred Gruen, economist
- Wang Gungwu, specialist in studying the Chinese diaspora
- Sir (William) Keith Hancock, historian
- Peter Firman Harrison, architect and town planner
- Peter Dunstan Hastings, journalist and editor
- Anthony F. Hill, in synthetic, organometallic & coordination chemistry
- A. D. Hope, poet and essayist
- Leonard Huxley, physicist
- Ken Inglis, historian
- Edward A. Irving, geologist
- Zvonimir Janko, mathematician
- Frank Lancaster Jones, sociologist
- Rhys Jones, archaeologist
- James Jupp, political scientist
- Peter Karmel, economist
- Roger Keesing, anthropologist
- Ben Kerkvliet, political scientist
- Brij Lal, historian, novelist and writer of non-fiction
- Kenneth Lampl, film composer, choral composer, and academic
- Geoffrey Lancaster, musicologist and pianist
- Andrew Leigh, economist and federal politician
- Ian McAllister, Irish-Australian public opinion political scientist
- Gavan McCormack, Orientalist
- Helen McGregor, geologist and climate change researcher, a Fellow with the Research School of Earth Sciences
- Brendan McKay, computer scientist
- Warwick McKibbin, economist
- Lew Mander, organic chemist
- Henry Evans Maude, anthropologist
- Achdiat Karta Mihardja, novelist and writer
- T. B. Millar, historian and political scientists
- John Minford, sinologist and literary translator
- Pat Moran, statistician
- Fred Nadel, anthropologist
- Bernhard Neumann, mathematician
- Hanna Neumann, mathematician, first female professor of mathematics in Australia
- Carmel O'Shannessy, linguistics professor
- Cliff Ollier, geologist
- Sir Mark Oliphant, physicist and Governor of South Australia
- Sarah Pryke, ecologist
- Lindsay Pryor, botanist
- Leo Radom, research chemist
- Anthony Reid, historian of Southeast Asia
- James Mahmud Rice, sociologist
- Ted Ringwood, geologist
- Malcolm Ross, linguist
- Amin Saikal, political scientist
- Brian P. Schmidt, Nobel Prize winning physicist
- Peter Self, academic
- Thomas Smith, economist
- Allan Snyder, optical physicist, visual scientist
- Oskar Spate, geographer
- Trevor Swan, economist
- Sir Ernest Titterton, nuclear physicist
- Neil Trudinger, mathematician
- Royall Tyler, Japan specialist
- Jonathan Unger, contemporary China specialist
- Michael Vernon, scientist and consumer activist
- Carola Garcia de Vinuesa, Head of the Department of Pathogens and Immunity at the College of Medicine
- Ling Wang (Wang Ling), historian of Chinese science
- Hugh White, Professor of Strategic Studies and Head of the Strategic and Defence Studies Centre
- Jack Waterford, journalist
- Anna Wierzbicka, linguist

== Philanthropy ==
- Phyllis Duguid, teacher, Aboriginal and women's rights advocate.

== Administration ==
=== Chancellors ===
Order	Chair of Interim Council	Term start	Term end	Time in office	Notes
1	Richard Mills	1946	1951	4–5 years	^{1}

^{1} Mills served as Chair of the Interim Council while the University was initially beginning operations. While Bruce was officially the first Chancellor, Mills had been effectively fulfilling the same function.

Order	Chancellor	Term start	Term end	Time in office	Notes
1	1st Viscount Bruce of Melbourne CH, MC, PC	1951	1961	9–10 years	
2	Sir John Cockcroft OM, KCB, CBE	1961	1965	3–4 years	
3	Lord Florey OM	1965	1968	2–3 years	
4	Dr. H. C. Coombs	1968	1976	7–8 years	
5	Sir John Crawford AC, KBE	1976	1984	7–8 years	
6	Sir Richard Blackburn OBE	1984	1987	2–3 years	
7	Sir Gordon Jackson AK	1987	1990	2–3 years	
8	Sir Geoffrey Yeend AC, CBE	1990	1994	3–4 years	
9	Peter Baume AC	1994	2006	11–12 years	
10	Allan Hawke AC	2006	31 December 2008	1–2 years	
11	Kim Beazley AC	1 January 2009	31 December 2009	1 year, 0 days	
12	Gareth Evans AC, QC	1 January 2010	31 December 2019	10 years, 0 days	
13	Julie Bishop	1 January 2020	8 May 2026	6 years, 321 days	
14	Gordon de Brouwer AO, PSM	19 August 2026	incumbent	91 days	

=== Vice-Chancellors ===
Order	Vice-Chancellor	Term start	Term end	Time in office	Notes
1	Sir Douglas Copland	11 May 1948	1953	4–5 years	
2	Sir Leslie Melville	1953	1960	6–7 years	
3	Sir Leonard Huxley	30 September 1960	1967	6–7 years	
4	Sir John Crawford	1968	1973	4–5 years	
5	Robert Williams	1973	1975	1–2 years	
6	Donald Anthony Low	1975	1982	6–7 years	
7	Peter Karmel	1982	1987	4–5 years	
8	Lawrence Walter Nichol	1988	1993	4–5 years	
9	Deane Terrell	1994	31 December 2000	6–7 years	
10	Ian Chubb	1 January 2001	2011	9–10 years	
11	Ian Young	2011	31 December 2015	4–5 years	
12	Brian Schmidt	1 January 2016	31 December 2023	8 years	
13	Genevieve Bell	1 January 2024	11 September 2025	1 year, 253 days	
