= Teretia (given name) =

Teretia is a feminine given name. Notable people with the name include:

- Teretia Teinaki (born 2002), Cook Islands footballer
- Teretia Tokam (fl. from 2014), I-Kiribati activist
