= Colin Butler (disambiguation) =

Colin Butler works in public health.

Colin Butler is also the name of:

- Colin Butler, musician in Pompeii
- Colin Butler (singer), see 1976 in country music
- Colin Butler (entomologist) (1913–2016), British entomologist
- Colin Butler, character in the BBC television drama series Our Friends in the North
