= China–Thailand relations =

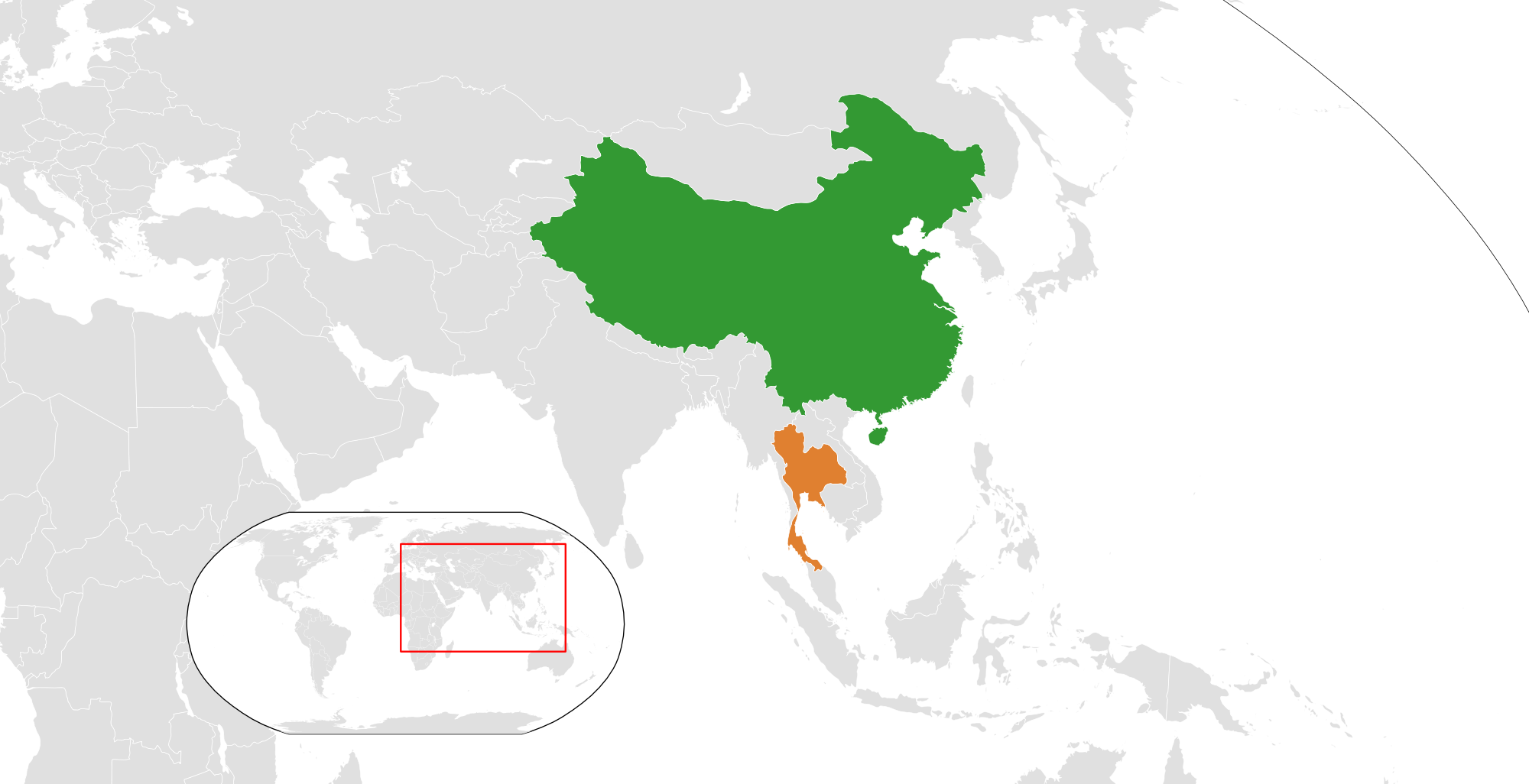
- China: Thailand

Diplomatic mission
- Embassy of China, Bangkok: Royal Thai Embassy, Beijing

Envoy
- Chargé d'Affaires Wu Zhiwu: Ambassador Chatchai Viriyavejakul

Official diplomatic relations between the People's Republic of China (PRC) and Thailand began on 1 July 1975 after years of negotiations during a volatile transitional period in Southeast Asia, 75 days after the Fall of Phnom Penh to the Khmer Rouge (Cambodian Reds) on 17 April, 62 days after the Fall of Saigon to the Viet Cong on 30 April and five months before Pathet Lao establishing the Lao People's Democratic Republic in December that same year, after the rise of three Marxist–Leninist governments which borders with Thailand to the north and northeast and to the southeast. Historically, Thailand had good relations with governments in China; however, after Plaek Phibunsongkhram attempted to erase and prohibit Chinese culture and influence in the country, relations with the Republic of China were damaged.

In modern times, China has significant influence in Thailand. China is Thailand's leading trading partner, with bilateral trade reaching $153 billion in 2025. China is also the leading source of tourists to Thailand. Especially since the 2014 Thai coup d'état, China has also been a leading exporter of weapons to Thailand.

== History ==
=== Medieval and Early modern period ===
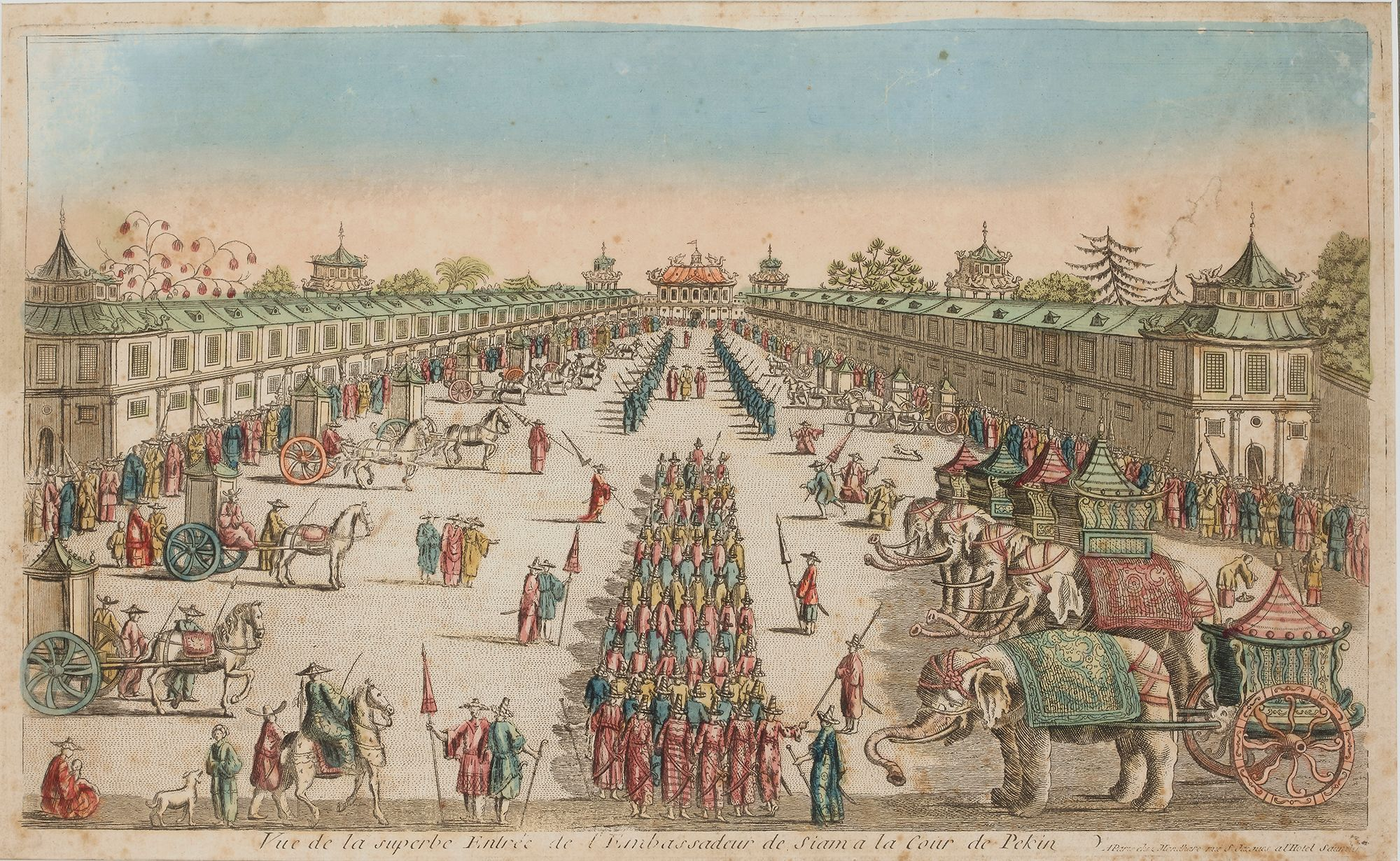
Entry of the Siamese ambassador to the Court of Beijing, 18th century

==== China and the Sukhothai Kingdom (1238–1438) ====
In the 12th century, the Sukhothai Kingdom was established located in present-day northern Thailand. Zhou Daguan, a Chinese diplomat, used the name "Xian Luo’" to refer to the Thai region in his writings. The Yuan dynasty's records also mention "Xian" (Siam).

During King Ramkhamhaeng's rule, the kingdom sent a letter to the Yuan dynasty, receiving a gold talisman in return. This marked the beginning of official relations between Sukhothai and China. Relationship between the two kingdoms were mostly mutual tribute and numerous diplomatic exchanges as noted by Yuan dynasty records.

==== China and the Ayutthaya Kingdom (1351–1767) ====
In 1370 A.D., the Ming government sent an envoy, Lü Zongjun along with a Chinese delegation, to the Thai region to contact the Ayutthaya Kingdom as stated in the Ming records (Ming shilu). The Ayutthaya king gifted six tame elephants, and Lü Zongjun returned to Nanjing in September 1371 A.D. During the Ming Dynasty, there were nineteen Chinese envoy visits to the kingdom and one hundred and two visits from Ayutthaya to China.

==== China's relations with the Thonburi Kingdom and the Chakri dynasty ====
In 1768, King Taksin tried to establish tribute relations with the Qing dynasty but was initially rejected. It was not until 1772 that the Qing government recognized his status. The Thonburi Kingdom, although brief, contributed to the future relations between the Chakri dynasty and the Qing dynasty. In 1782, Rama I of the Chakri dynasty successfully inherited favorable tribute relations, leading to 36 recorded official tributes between the two countries according to the Qingshi Gao.

=== China's relations with Siam and the colonisation of French Indochina ===
Flag of Cambodia under the French protectorate (1863–1953)

Flag of Laos under the French protectorate (1893–1953)

Before the French carved out its empire in Southeast Asia, its primary adversary in the region was the Qing dynasty, which existed within the traditional Chinese tributary system, looking to Beijing as their ultimate geopolitical protector, but then decided to sail along the Mekong River led by the diplomat Auguste Pavie. The Cambodian King Norodom made a desperate calculation where he signed a treaty on 11 August 1863, by establishing a French protectorate over Cambodia. The Franco-Siamese War of 1893 had caught the attention of French warships defied Siamese warnings and sailed up the Chao Phraya River, exchanging fire with coastal forts before anchoring directly outside the royal palace in Bangkok. With gunboats pointed at his capital, King Chulalongkorn faced an ultimatum. Siam formally ceded all Laotian territories east of the Mekong to France, as the territory quickly absorbed into the growing federation of French Indochina.

=== Modern times ===

In 1932, Siam's People's Party overthrew the absolute monarchy and established a constitutional monarchy. It intensified assimilationist policies towards the Chinese community in Siam. From 1938 to 1939, it passed a series of laws to eliminate the economic influence of Chinese people, including prohibiting Chinese from certain professions, dealing in certain goods, and living in specified residential areas. The country's Nationality Law was amended in 1939 to require that all Chinese seeking to become citizens had to adopt Thai names, enroll their children in Thai schools, speak Thai, and renounce any allegiance to China.

During World War II, Thailand further restricted the political activities of Chinese. In 1943, Thailand prohibited Chinese people from purchasing land. After decades of exploitation and the disruption of World War II, France's grip on the region fractured.

After the establishment of the People's Republic of China, Thailand imposed immigration quotas that virtually prohibited immigration to Thailand from the PRC, which actively supported regional communist movements, including the Communist Party of Thailand (CPT), driving a deep wedge between Bangkok and Beijing. During the Korean War, Thai forces under the United Nations Command fought the PRC's People's Volunteer Army in multiple battles. Both Cambodia and Laos achieved full independence from France in late 1953. After 1955, Thailand began easing its naturalization policies.

Under Prime Minister such as Plaek Phibunsongkhram, relations with the Chinese were tense during the Cold War. However, Phibunsongkhram sent the children of his advisor Sang Phathanothai to live in China as a goodwill gesture and for informal backdoor diplomacy. The book The Dragon's Pearl by Phathanothai's daughter Sirin recounts her experience in growing up during the Cultural Revolution in China. Thailand and the United States backed the anti-communist Royal Lao Government, which included figures like Prince Boun Oum. The Pathet Lao led by Prince Souphanouvong ("Red Prince") became a Marxist–Leninist movement heavily supported by Chairman Mao. In 1966, Saloth Sâr who would later be known as "Pol Pot", a French pseudonym for "Politique Potentielle", under King Norodom Sihanouk's government, founded the Communist Party of Kampuchea (CPK). By 1968, these insurgent forces became widely known as the Khmer Rouge (Cambodian Reds). On 17 April 1975, the Khmer Rouge captured Phnom Penh, ending the Cambodian Civil War and the beginning of Year Zero, where Cambodia was later renamed "Democratic Kampuchea" (DK) by the constitution on 5 January 1976, nine months after "Angkar" (The Organization) came to power.

In June 1963, Thai King Bhumibol and his wife, Sirikit, visited Taipei in the Republic of China (ROC). In 1969, Minister of National Defense Chiang Ching-kuo visited Bangkok as a special envoy of the government of the Republic of China to meet with Thai King. Thailand switched diplomatic relations from to the People's Republic of China in July 1975, three months after the fall of Phnom Penh to the Khmer Rouge and five months before Pathet Lao took over the city of Vientiane in December that same year.

Until 1975, relations were of mutual suspicion, as the PRC supported left-leaning factions within the Thai political circle, and Thailand was wary of Chinese involvement with Cambodian and Laotian conflicts during the civil war for the communist movements of the Khmer Rouge and Pathet Lao. Following the events of 1975 as part of Asian domino theory, Thailand became geographically bordered by the three communist nations including the Viet Cong at the Fall of Saigon that led the unification of Vietnam on 2 July 1976, and renamed Saigon to "Ho Chi Minh City" in honor of the late revolutionary leader.

In 1978, the relations developed positively as Cambodia and Vietnam engaged in escalating border skirmishes, as Beijing utilized diplomatic reassurance and covert military logistics to bind Thailand to its security architecture in which threatened the security of Southeast Asia that escalates between Vietnam and Democratic Kampuchea.

Relations continue to develop as trade became the dominant theme in bilateral relations. Thailand continues to support the One China Policy and maintains unofficial relations with Taiwan, which helps Thailand gain access to capital and the huge mainland Chinese market. Thai-Chinese businesses are part of the larger bamboo network. The Charoen Pokphand (CP Group), a prominent Thai conglomerate founded by the Thai-Chinese Chearavanont family, has been the single largest foreign investor in China.

In 1994, Taiwanese leader Lee Teng-hui made a private visit to Thailand and met with Thai King to discuss projects on economic co-operation.

Thai Princess Sirindhorn has received China's Medal of Friendship and Chinese Language and Culture Friendship Award for her work in promoting closer relations between the two countries. She speaks fluent Mandarin Chinese and has translated several Chinese novels into Thai.

Thailand adopted a policy of improving relations with China since the 2014 Thai coup d'état, when relations with the West worsened. In the Thai House of Representatives, concerns had been raised regarding increasing Chinese influence over the country, and some dubbed Thailand as a Chinese province, with the Chinese acquisition of land and real estate allowing China to build dams in the Mekong, and a Chinese private company to invest in the Thai high-speed rail megaproject.

==== 2020s ====
In 2024, Thailand and China signed a visa-waiver program that lifted the visa requirement for citizens of both nations, effective since March 1, 2024.

During Thai PM Paetongtarn Shinawatra's visit to Beijing, concerns arose over the potential deportation of 48 Uyghur detainees in Thailand, despite warnings of abuse if sent back to China. The visit also focused on strengthening bilateral ties in areas like infrastructure and technology.

In July 2025, officials from the Chinese Embassy in Bangkok demanded that the Bangkok Art and Culture Centre (BACC) censor pieces from an exhibit titled "Constellation of Complicity: Visualising the Global Machinery of Authoritarian Solidarity", which included art critical of China. The BACC was forced to remove pieces by the Bangkok Metropolitan Administration.

During Thai prime minister Anutin Charnvirakul's visit to China in July 2026, China and Thailand pledged to deepen cooperation in technology and innovation, including artificial intelligence, aerospace, clean energy, advanced materials and agricultural technology. They also agreed to expand industrial and academic research cooperation, strengthen supply chains and increase coordination in foreign affairs and defence.

== Economic relations ==
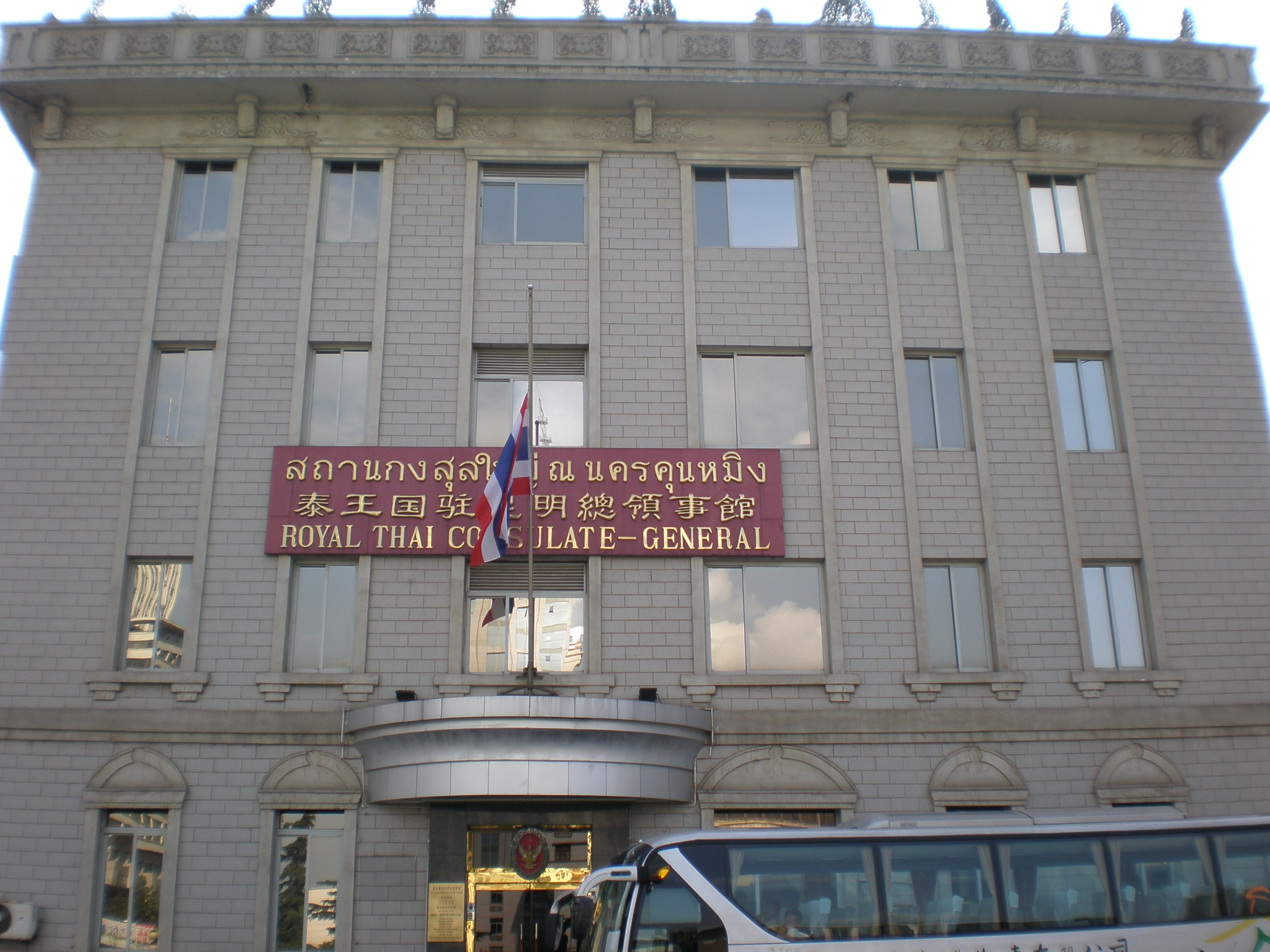
Thai Consulate in Kunming

China is Thailand's top trading partner. Bilateral trade relations grow each year. Bilateral trade in 1999 was worth US$4.22 billion. That reached $25.3 billion in 2006, US$31.07 billion in 2007, and US$36.2 billion in 2008. In 2025, trade between the two countries was worth US$153 billion. The 21st-century Chinese transformation into a major economic power has led to an increase of foreign investments in the bamboo network. The a network of overseas Chinese businesses operating in the markets of Southeast Asia shares family and cultural ties.

China is Thailand's second-largest export market. China is also Thailand's largest importer of goods into the country in 2010. China's exports to Thailand computer components, electrical motors, consumer electronics, machinery, metal products, chemicals, and clothing. Thailand's exports to China computer components, rubber, refined oil, plastic pellets, chemical electronics, crude oil, wood products, and food.

China and Thailand signed a free trade agreement 2003 that covered agricultural products. It was also known as an early harvest agreement on agricultural products. China takes advantage of the ASEAN–China Free Trade Area, which came into effect January 1, 2010 and will allow its goods to be exported through ASEAN countries with zero or reduced trade barriers.

In 2011, China announced its plan to invest US$1.51 billion to establish the China City Complex in Bangkok for trading in Chinese-made goods like garments, ornaments, and household items. On 6 June 2013, Thailand and China signed a five-year plan on strengthen their maritime cooperation.

Thailand was the first country able to export fresh durian to China.

Thailand joined the Belt and Road Initiative (BRI) in 2018. The public in Thailand view China's BRI projects in the country, such as railways, positively.

== Military relations ==
Military ties increased following the 2014 Thai coup d'état. Between 2016 and 2022 Thailand purchased US$394 million worth of Chinese weapons, compared to US$207 million from the United States. Thai Prime Minister Prayuth Chan-ocha ordered 49 Chinese VT-4 main battle tanks and 3 submarines, which cost more than US$1 billion. China and Thailand agreed to open a joint commercial arms factory in Khon Kaen. It will be responsible for the assembly, production, and maintenance of land weapon systems for the Royal Thai Army. Specific details were subject to further discussions between the ministry and Norinco, which makes tanks, weapons, and other heavy equipment. In May 2017, the Royal Thai Navy signed a contract with the China Shipbuilding Industry Corporation for a S26T diesel-electric submarine, which is derived from the Type 039A submarine. The submarine is expected to be delivered in 2023. Chinese Military Commentator Zhou Chenming stated that China will also likely provide technical guidance to Thailand.

=== Military exercises ===
In November 2015, Thailand and China held joint air exercises. In March to April of 2025, the Royal Thai Navy and People's Liberation Army Navy conducted the Blue Strike-2025 joint exercises in Zhanjiang.

== Educational relations ==
In 2006, Thailand's Ministry of Education signed an agreement with Hanban to promote Chinese language education in Thailand. Thailand is one of the biggest promoters of Chinese language education in southeast Asia. In 2009, China and Thailand signed an agreement on education cooperation.

Thailand was one of the first countries in southeast Asia to open a Confucius Institute. As of 2024, it has 16 Confucius Institutes, the most of any country in Asia. China built the Sirindhorn Chinese Language and Culture Center at Mae Fah Luang University in Thailand as a gift. It was named after Princess Sirindhorn in honor of her role in cultural exchange between Thailand and China. The center hosts a Confucius Institute, which is operated in partnership with Xiamen University.

== Cultural relations ==
In 2012, China established a cultural center in Bangkok, Thailand. It is the largest cultural center established by China in southeast Asia.

== Public opinion ==
According to a 2026 feeling thermometer poll by the Carter Center and Emory University, Chinese opinion of Thailand was on average 38 out of 100.

A survey published in 2026 by the Pew Research Center found that 69% of Thai people had a favorable view of China, while 30% had an unfavorable view.

== See also ==
- Embassy of China, Bangkok
- ASEAN–China Free Trade Area
- Thai Chinese
- Bamboo network
