= Indonesia–Myanmar relations =

- Indonesia: Myanmar

Indonesia and Myanmar established diplomatic relations in 1949. Indonesia has an embassy in Yangon, while Myanmar has an embassy in Jakarta.

== History ==
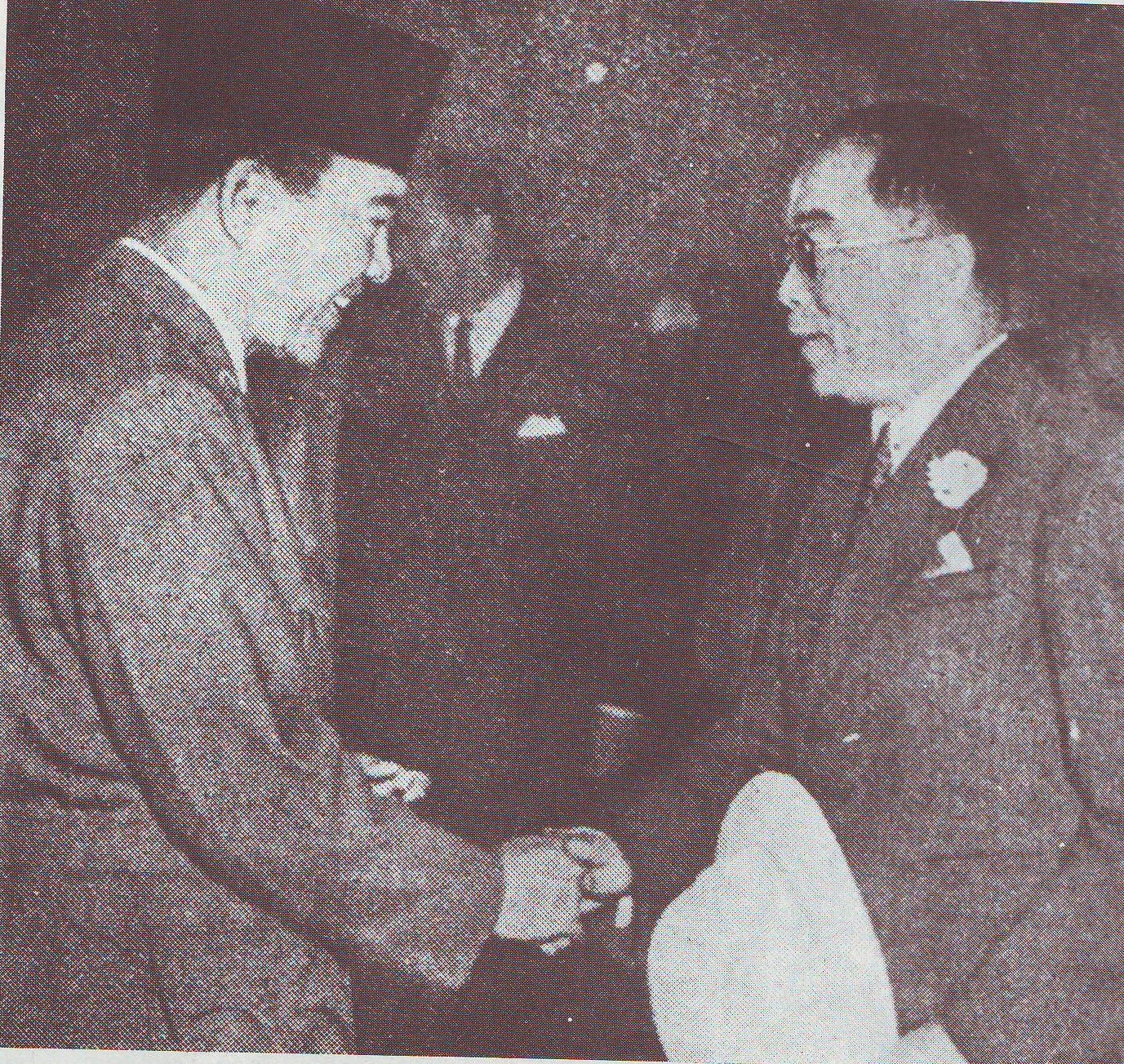
Sukarno and Sao Shwe Thaik

The relations between ancient Indonesia and Myanmar dated back to the 14th century, the Nagarakretagama Javanese manuscript dated from Majapahit period has mentioned Marutma, a state that today is identified as Martaban or Mottama, located in modern Southern Myanmar.

Burma has been a strong supporter of Indonesia's struggle for independence. In 1947, Burma, then under transitional government, requested the Indian Government to hold Conference on Indonesian Affairs in New Delhi. On 23 March – 2 April 1947, India held Asian Relations Conference in New Delhi, India, in which Burma, still under British colonial rule, showed its support by condemning Dutch military aggression. During Indonesia's struggle for independence, Burma allowed Indonesia Dakota RI-001 "Seulawah" aircraft, donated by Acehnese people, to land at the then called Rangoon's Mingaladon Airport on 26 January 1949 and was rented by Union of Burma Airways.

Burma declared its independence from Britain on January 4, 1948. Subsequently, the two countries officially established diplomatic relation on 27 December 1949. The establishment of diplomatic relation between the two countries was highlighted by the opening of "Indonesian House" in Yangon, which was later upgraded into the Embassy of the Republic of Indonesia in April 1950. At that time, President Sukarno hailed Burma as "a comrade in struggling and fulfilling true independence".

== Co-operation ==
Indonesia supported and welcomed Myanmar's membership to the Association of Southeast Asian Nations (ASEAN) in 1997. Indonesia also supports Myanmar's democratization process. Indonesia has since been playing the role of a regional supervisor of democracy by constantly encouraging Naypidaw to reform its authoritarian system.

As the world's most populous Muslim country, Indonesia watches the communal violence against Rohingya Muslim minority closely. Indonesia also exchange views with Bangladesh and United Nations Refugee Agency (UNHCR), to voice their concern and addressing the Rohingya refugees problems in Myanmar. The UN agency expressed appreciation for Indonesia's contribution to helping find solution to the Rohingya issue. Yudhoyono, the president of Indonesia, urge Myanmar's leaders to address Buddhist-led violence against Muslims that he said could cause problems for Muslims elsewhere in the region. Indonesia encourages Myanmar to address the Rohingya issue wisely, appropriately and prevent tension and violence. Indonesia is ready to support Myanmar to reach those goals.

On May 22 and August 20, 2013 Indonesian Police anti-terror squad Detachment 88, caught terrorist suspects and revealed an attempt by Indonesian Islamist militants to bomb the Myanmar Embassy in Jakarta. This failed terrorist plot was said to retaliate the killing of Rohingya Muslims in Myanmar.

In 2017, following a military persecution of the Rohingyas, protesters demonstrated in front of the Myanmar embassy in Jakarta and a molotov cocktail was thrown into the building.

== High Level Visits ==
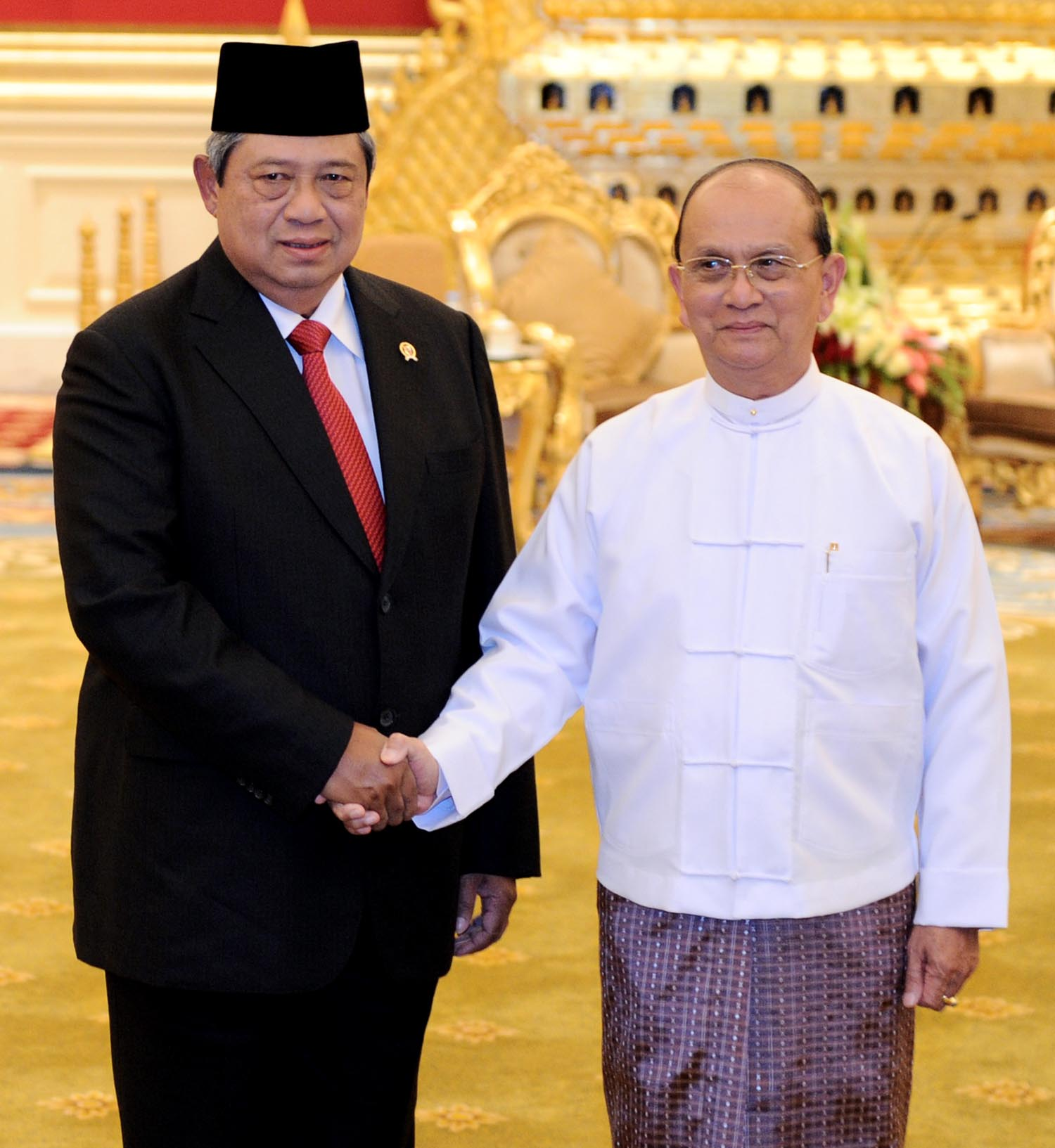
President Yudhoyono and Thein Sein during Yudhoyono's visit to Myanmar, 23 April 2013

President Soeharto paid a visit to Myanmar on 26 November 1972, on 22–29 August 1974, and on 23–25 February 1997. On the other hand, General Ne Win paid a visit to Indonesia on 11–14 June 1973 and on 8–13 June 1974. General Ne Win also paid a personal visit to Indonesia on 23–25 September 1997 at the invitation of President Soeharto. Meanwhile, Senior General Than Shwe also paid a visit to Indonesia on 5–8 June 1995, November 1996, and in April 2005.

Other indication of the improvement of Indonesia–Myanmar relationship is the visit of three Indonesian Presidents to Myanmar: President Abdurrahman Wahid on 7 November 1999, President Megawati Sukarnoputri on 24 August 2001, and President Dr. Susilo Bambang Yudhoyono on 1–2 March 2006 and 23–24 April 2013. Myanmar Prime Minister General Thein Sein paid an official visit to Indonesia on 16–17 March 2009 and May 2011.

== Trade and Investment ==
Indonesia's exports to Myanmar include paper and paper products, palm oil, iron and steel, tobacco and rubber. Meanwhile, Indonesia's imports from Myanmar include cornstarch, timber, nuts, soda, fish and vegetables. Myanmar indicated its desire to import fertilizer or cement and invited Indonesian investors to invest or open businesses in Myanmar. The total value of Indonesia-Myanmar trade as of June 2008 amounted to US$159 million.

Indonesia also agreed to invest in Myanmar's electrical power and construction sector. Indonesia's largest cement producer, PT Semen Indonesia, agreed to invest US$200 million in a cement plant in Myanmar that will be built early in 2014. During his state visit in April 2013, President Yudhoyono vowed to increase economic cooperation in line with Myanmar's reforms, and also promised to push Indonesia's public and private firms to invest in Myanmar, and set a target trade volume of $1 billion for 2014. Both Indonesia and Myanmar are promoting the two countries' trade volume. The trade volume is estimated to reach up to $1 billion in 2016. Indonesia has offered to purchase 300,000 tons of rice from Myanmar.

== Human Trafficking ==
Indonesia-Myanmar relations involve diplomatic and humanitarian cooperation, including efforts to combat human trafficking. On 28 February 2025, Indonesia repatriated 84 citizens from scam centers in Myanmar, part of a larger crackdown by Thailand, Myanmar, and China. The evacuees, initially stranded in Myawaddy, were transported via Mae Sot, Thailand, before arriving in Jakarta. Indonesia continues efforts to repatriate over 360 more citizens. The scam centers, linked to forced labor in fraudulent schemes, have victimized thousands across Southeast Asia. The crackdown follows a February meeting between Thai and Chinese leaders, leading to stricter measures, including cutting utilities to scam hubs.
