= The Encyclopaedia of Korea =

Book by Yang Hi Choe-Wall

Encyclopedia of Korea
- A crown from late 5th or early 6th century Silla
- Author: Yang Hi Choe-Wall; Pettid, Michael J; Mueller, Mark C; Wall, Raymond F
- Language: English language
- Subject: General
- Genre: Reference encyclopedia
- Publisher: The Australian National University
- Publication date: 1999–present
- Publication place: Korea
- Media type: digital

The Encyclopedia of Korea (Korean: 영문 디지털 한국백과사전), a part of the Open Research Library Digital Collections, is the first comprehensive English language encyclopedia of Korea.

Sixty Koreanists worldwide contributed some 1300 entries. Of these, Korean scholars contributed about 30 per cent and 70 per cent were from foreign scholars such as Martina Deuchler, David R. McCann, James Palais, Keith Howard, James Hoare and others. Of the minor entries, many are English translations from the Encyclopedia of Korean Culture and relevant Japanese and Chinese sources.

The contributors' names are recorded in the "List of Contributors and Translators" and also at the end of the entry itself, complete with bibliographical references for further reading. The "Index of Entries" is extensive (about 120 pages), and its contents include the entries in both Sino-Korean and English.

The encyclopaedia has about 1500 pages. Korean words are Romanized according to the McCune–Reischauer Romanization System, with some minor exceptions. Overall Statistics (ANU Open Research Library Statistic for "Encyclopaedia of Korea") available since the Encyclopaedia became part of the ANU's Open Access Digital Collection in 2011, there have been 9,042 + views and 23,112 + downloads of whole and part articles.

The Encyclopaedia is hyperlinked. The Table of Contents, as well as over 1,000 entries and 700 cross-references in the Index of Entries, are hyperlinked to the relevant articles and references in the main text of the Encyclopaedia.
