= Brian Schmidt =

American-born Australian astrophysicist and Nobel Laureate

Brian Schmidt AC FRS FAA FTSE
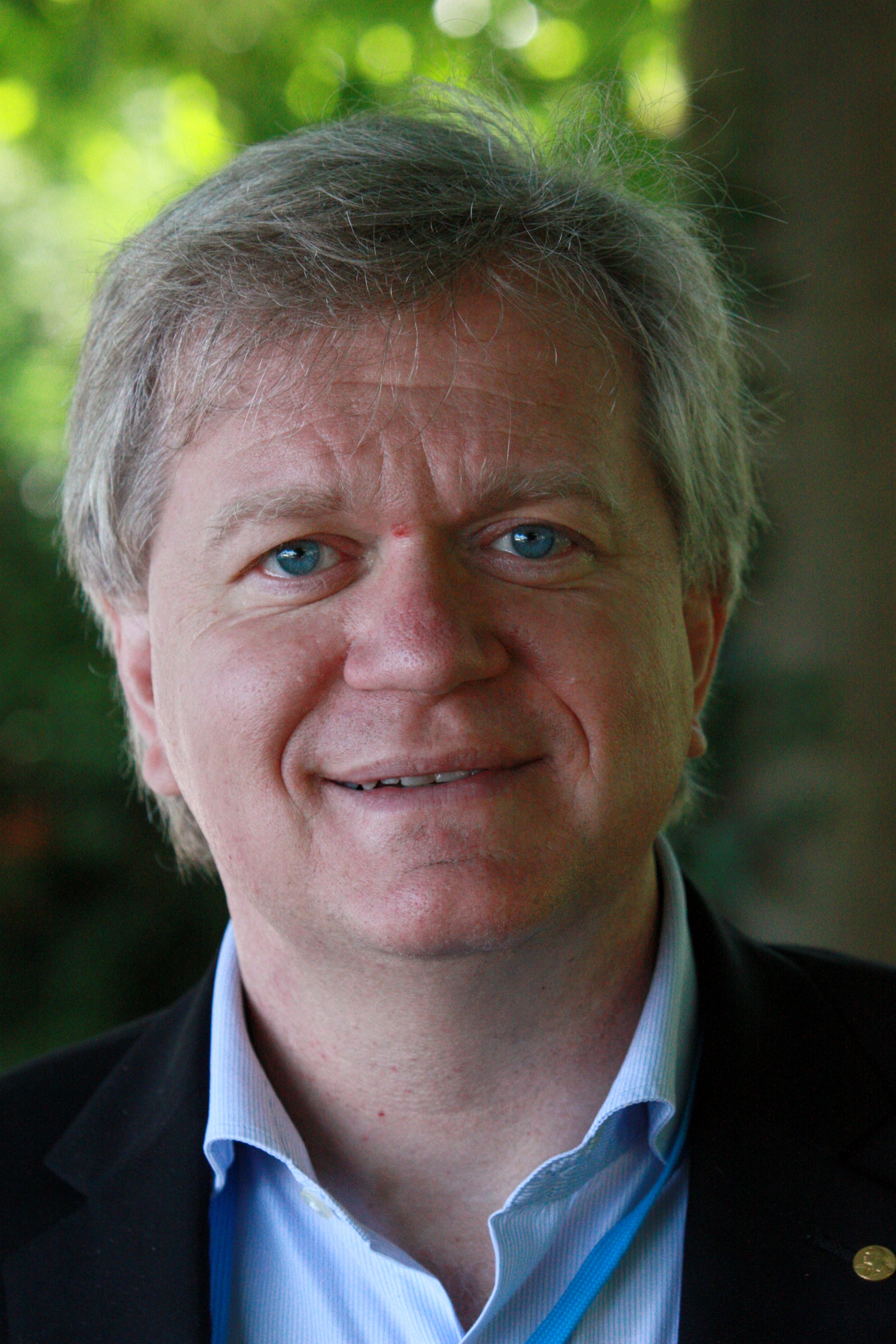
- Schmidt at the 2012 Lindau Nobel Laureate Meeting

12th Vice-Chancellor of the Australian National University
- In office 1 January 2016 – 31 December 2023
- Chancellor: Gareth Evans; Julie Bishop
- Preceded by: Ian Young
- Succeeded by: Genevieve Bell

Personal details
- Born: Brian Schmidt; 24 February 1967 (age 59) Missoula, Montana, United States
- Citizenship: Australia
- Scientific career
- Education: University of Arizona (1989), Harvard University (1993)
- Spouse: Jennifer M. Gordon
- Awards: Pawsey Medal (2001); Shaw Prize in Astronomy (2006); Australian Laureate Fellowship (2009); Nobel Prize in Physics (2011); FRS (2012); UNSW Dirac Medal (2012); AC (2013); Breakthrough Prize in Fundamental Physics (2015)
- Fields: Astrophysics
- Workplaces: Australian National University
- Thesis: Type II supernovae, expanding photospheres, and the extragalactic distance scale (1993)
- Doctoral advisor: Robert Kirshner
- Doctoral students: Manisha Caleb
- Schmidt's voice recorded February 2016
- Website: www.mso.anu.edu.au/~brian/

Brian Paul Schmidt (born 24 February 1967) is an American Australian astrophysicist at the Australian National University's Mount Stromlo Observatory and Research School of Astronomy and Astrophysics. He was the Vice-Chancellor of the Australian National University (ANU) from January 2016 to January 2024. He is known for his research in using supernovae as cosmological probes. He previously held a Federation Fellowship and a Laureate Fellowship from the Australian Research Council, and was elected a Fellow of the Royal Society (FRS) in 2012. Schmidt shared both the 2006 Shaw Prize in Astronomy and the 2011 Nobel Prize in Physics with Saul Perlmutter and Adam Riess for providing evidence that the expansion of the universe is accelerating.

== Early life and education ==
Interview with Brian Schmidt after his Nobel lecture

Schmidt, an only child, was born in Missoula, Montana, where his father Dana C. Schmidt was a fisheries biologist. When he was 13, his family relocated to Anchorage, Alaska.

Schmidt attended Bartlett High School in Anchorage, Alaska, and graduated in 1985. He has said that he wanted to be a meteorologist "since I was about five-years-old [but]... I did some work at the USA National Weather Service up in Anchorage and didn't enjoy it very much. It was less scientific, not as exciting as I thought it would be—there was a lot of routine. But I guess I was just a little naive about what being a meteorologist meant." His decision to study astronomy, which he had seen as "a minor pastime", was made just before he enrolled at university. Even then, he was not fully committed: he said "I'll do astronomy and change into something else later", and just never made that change.

He graduated with a BS (Physics) and BS (Astronomy) from the University of Arizona in 1989. He received his AM (Astronomy) in 1992 and then PhD (Astronomy) in 1993 from Harvard University. Schmidt's PhD thesis was supervised by Robert Kirshner and used Type II Supernovae to measure the Hubble Constant.

While at Harvard, he met his future wife, the Australian (Jenny) Jennifer M. Gordon who was a PhD student in economics. In 1994, they moved to Australia.

== Research and career ==
Schmidt was a postdoctoral research Fellow at the Center for Astrophysics | Harvard & Smithsonian (1993–1994) before moving on to the ANU's Mount Stromlo Observatory in 1995.

In 1994, Schmidt and Nicholas B. Suntzeff formed the High-Z Supernova Search Team to measure the expected deceleration of the universe and the deceleration parameter (q0) using distances to Type Ia supernovae. In 1995, the HZT at a meeting at the Center for Astrophysics | Harvard & Smithsonian elected Schmidt as the overall leader of the HZT. Schmidt led the team from Australia and in 1998 in the HZT paper with first author Adam Riess the first evidence was presented that the universe's expansion rate is not decelerating; it is accelerating. The team's observations were contrary to the then-current models, which predicted that the expansion of the universe should be slowing down, and when the preliminary results emerged Schmidt assumed it was an error and he spent the next six weeks trying to find the mistake. But there was no mistake: contrary to expectations, by monitoring the brightness and measuring the redshift of the supernovae, they discovered that these billion-year old exploding stars and their galaxies were accelerating away from our reference frame. This result was also found nearly simultaneously by the Supernova Cosmology Project, led by Saul Perlmutter. The corroborating evidence between the two competing studies led to the acceptance of the accelerating universe theory and initiated new research to understand the nature of the universe, such as the existence of dark energy. The discovery of the accelerating universe was named 'Breakthrough of the Year' by Science in 1998, and Schmidt was jointly awarded the 2011 Nobel Prize in Physics along with Riess and Perlmutter for their groundbreaking work.

Schmidt is currently leading the SkyMapper telescope Project and the associated Southern Sky Survey, which will encompass billions of individual objects, enabling the team to pick out the most unusual objects. In 2014 they announced the discovery of the first star which did not contain any iron, indicating that it is a very primitive star, probably formed during the first rush of star formation following the Big Bang.

He is the chairman of the board of directors of Astronomy Australia Limited, and he serves on the management committee of the ARC Centre of Excellence for All-Sky Astrophysics (CAASTRO). In July 2012 Schmidt was given a three-year appointment to sit on the Questacon Advisory Council. As of March 2017, Schmidt serves as a member of the Bulletin of the Atomic Scientists' Board of Sponsors.

=== ANU Vice-Chancellor ===
On 24 June 2015 it was announced Schmidt would replace Ian Young as the 12th Vice-Chancellor of the Australian National University, to commence his tenure on 1 January 2016. The Chancellor of the ANU, Professor Gareth Evans, said, "Brian Schmidt is superbly placed to deliver on the ambition of ANU founders – to permanently secure our position among the great universities of the world, and as a crucial contributor to the nation ... We had a stellar field of international and Australian candidates, and have chosen an inspirational leader. ... Brian's vision, vitality, global stature and communication skills are going to take our national university to places it has never been before." On 2 February 2023, Schmidt announced that he would be stepping down as vice chancellor at the end of the year.

=== Science advocacy ===
The publicity that came with winning the Nobel Prize has given Schmidt the opportunity to help the public understand why science is important to society, and to champion associated causes.

Public education
One of his first acts after winning the Nobel Prize was to donate $100,000 out of his prize money to the PrimaryConnections program, an initiative of the Australian Academy of Science that assists primary school teachers. He has continued to press for improvements to the public school system, particularly in the sciences and mathematical literacy (numeracy). He sees the major problem is that so few of the teachers are trained in "STEM" (science, technology, engineering and mathematics) disciplines. He used the opportunity of delivering a speech at the National Press Club to call for more focus on the public education system, including holding principals more accountable and the proper use of standardised testing, concluding with the warning that otherwise "the fundamental tenet of Australian democracy, that we all deserve a fair go, is at risk of being eroded away along with our public school system." At the other end of the spectrum, he also raises the profile of the matter by visiting primary schools personally to answer children's questions.
Funding for scientific and medical research
Schmidt is a strong supporter of funding scientific and medical research on a long-term, non-partisan basis driven by a national research strategy. He has often voiced his concern that the current year-to-year uncertainty and lack of co-ordination make it difficult to establish and staff large facilities, or to participate in multi-national ventures, and that scientists spend too much time applying for funding instead of doing research. Interviewed by the Australian Financial Review, Schmidt was characteristically forthright: "It's unclear to me whether or not we will continue to be a great astronomy nation... If we're damaged it will take 20 years to fix ourselves. It only takes one year to cause 20 years of damage."
Climate change
He urges people to pay attention to the consensus of expert opinions, instead of basing their conclusions on the incomplete information which they personally know. Launching the Australian Academy of Science's report "The science of climate change: questions and answers", Schmidt commented that "Whenever this subject comes up, it never ceases to amaze me how each person I meet suddenly becomes an expert... More surprising is the supreme confidence that non-experts (scientists and non-scientists alike) have in their own understanding of the subject." In 2014 he put up $10,000 of his own money in a bet with Maurice Newman, chairman of the Prime Minister's Business Advisory Council from 2013 to 2015, that global temperatures will rise. In 2015, he presented the Mainau Declaration 2015 on Climate Change on the final day of the 65th Lindau Nobel Laureate Meeting, which was signed by 76 Nobel Laureates and handed to then President of the French Republic, François Hollande, as part of the successful COP21 climate summit in Paris.

== Awards and honours ==
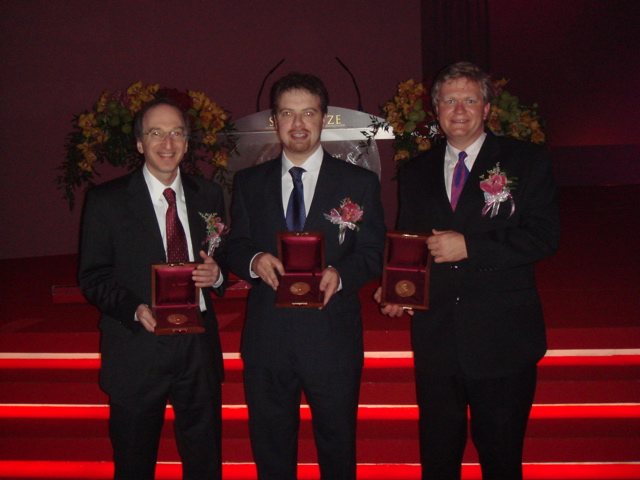
Saul Perlmutter, Adam Riess, and Brian Schmidt being awarded the 2006 Shaw Prize in Astronomy. The trio would later be awarded the 2011 Nobel Prize in Physics.

Schmidt has received the Australian Government's inaugural Malcolm McIntosh Prize for achievement in the Physical Sciences in 2000, Harvard University's Bok Prize in 2000, the Australian Academy of Science's Pawsey Medal Medal in 2001, and the Astronomical Society of India's Vainu Bappu Medal in 2002. He was the Marc Aaronson Memorial Lecturer in 2005, the same year he received an ARC Federation Fellowship, and in 2006 he shared the Shaw Prize in Astronomy with Adam Riess and Saul Perlmutter. In 2009, he was awarded an Australian Laureate Fellowship.

Schmidt and the other members of the High-Z Team (the set defined by the co-authors of Riess et al. 1998) shared the 2007 Gruber Cosmology Prize, a $500,000 award, with Saul Perlmutter of the Lawrence Berkeley National Laboratory and the Supernova Cosmology Project (the set defined by the co-authors of Perlmutter et al. 1999) for their discovery of the accelerating expansion of the universe.

Schmidt, along with Riess and Perlmutter, jointly won the 2011 Nobel Prize in Physics for their observations which led to the discovery of the accelerating universe.

Schmidt was appointed a Companion of the Order of Australia in the 2013 Australia Day Honours. He was called "Australian of the Year" for 2011 by The Australian newspaper. He is a Fellow and council member of the Australian Academy of Science, The United States National Academy of Sciences, the Royal Society, and Foreign Member of the Spanish Royal Academy of Sciences.

Schmidt, Adam Riess, and the High-Z Supernova Search Team shared in the 2015 Breakthrough Prize in Fundamental Physics.

Schmidt was awarded the Dirac Medal of the University of New South Wales in 2012 and the Niels Bohr Institute Medal of Honour in 2015. He was elected a Fellow of the Royal Society (FRS) in 2012; his certificate of election to the Royal Society reads:

Brian Schmidt is an internationally renowned researcher in cosmology and also in the physics of supernovae and gamma ray bursts. In particular, Schmidt's formation and leadership of the High-z Supernova Search Team led to the discovery that the expansion of our universe is accelerating, for which he shared the 2011 Nobel Prize in Physics. This discovery completely changed our understanding of the universe. It showed that about 70% of the mass of our Universe is in a previously unknown form which is now usually referred to as 'Dark Energy'.

He was elected a Fellow of the Australian Academy of Technological Sciences and Engineering (FTSE) in 2023.

== Personal life ==
Schmidt is married to Jennifer Gordon. They met while they were both studying for their PhDs at Harvard – he in astrophysics and she in economics. They decided to settle in Australia, which he had already visited on several occasions to visit family. He now holds dual citizenship of Australia and the United States.

He is not religious, being described as a "militant agnostic" with his tagline, "I don't know, and neither do you!"

=== Vineyard and winery ===
Schmidt and his wife own and operate Maipenrai Vineyard and Winery, a small winery established in 2000 in Sutton, near Canberra. The vineyard covers 1.1 hectares (2.7 acres), producing exclusively pinot noir grapes, and the wines have received favourable reviews. Schmidt has quipped that "it's easier to sell your wine when you have a Nobel prize". At the 2011 Nobel Prize Ceremonies in Stockholm, he presented the King Carl XVI Gustaf of Sweden with a bottle of wine from his winery.

In 2013, Schmidt was appointed to join the board of the federal government's Australian Wine Research Institute. The Institute's chairman Peter Dawson commented that Schmidt brings to the board "a unique combination of scientific excellence, wine industry knowledge and relevant board experience".

== See also ==
- List of celebrities who own wineries and vineyards

Awards and achievements
Preceded by Konstantin Novoselov and Andre Geim	Winner of the Nobel Prize in Physics with Saul Perlmutter and Adam Riess; 2011	Succeeded by Serge Haroche and David J. Wineland
Educational offices
Preceded by Ian Young	12th Vice-Chancellor of the Australian National University; 2016–2023	Succeeded by Genevieve Bell
