= List of ambassadors of Thailand to China =

Coordinates: 39.912893°N 116.438511°E

Ambassador of Thailand to China
- Incumbent; Chatchai Viriyavejakul since 2024
- Inaugural holder: Phya Abhibal Rajamaitri
- Formation: July 8, 1948

The Thai Ambassador in Beijing is the official representative of the Government in Bangkok to the Government of China.

President of the Republic of China

== List of representatives to the Republic of China (1912–1949) ==
diplomatic agreement/designated/Diplomatic accreditation	ambassador	Thai language	Chinese language	Observations	Prime Minister of Thailand	President of the Republic of China	Term end
January 1, 1946	Sanguan Tularak			The governments in Nanjing and Bangkok established diplomatic relations.	Kuang Abhayawongse	Chiang Kai-shek	
September 6, 1946				The first Chinese Ambassador to Thailand arrived at Bangkok on 6 September 1946.	Phibul Songkhram	Chiang Kai-shek	
July 8, 1948	Phya Abhibal Rajamaitri			(1885-) 1935 ambassador to Washington, D.C.	Phibul Songkhram	Chiang Kai-shek	

== List of representatives to the Republic of China (Taiwan) ==
diplomatic agreement/designated/Diplomatic accreditation	ambassador	Thai language	Chinese language	Observations	Prime Minister of Thailand	Term end
May 15, 1958	Sundhorn Sundhornnavin			Mutual efforts to promote friendly relations between China and Thailand culminated in the appointment of Admiral Sundhorn Sundhornnavin as the Royal Thai ambassador extraordinary and plenipotentiary to the Republic of China.	Thanom Kittikachorn	
December 21, 1963	Swai Srihadung			Swai Sribhadung	Thanom Kittikachorn	
1965	Chapikorn Sreshthaputra			Mr. Chapikorn Sreshthaputra as the new Thai Ambassador to the Republic of China to succeed Vice Admiral Swai Sribhadung. New Thai Ambassador-Designate to the Federation of Nigeria It was announced on November 17, 1965, that the	Thanom Kittikachorn	
May 12, 1971	Sanong Nisalak				Thanom Kittikachorn	November 1, 1973

== List of representatives to the People's Republic of China ==
diplomatic agreement/designated/Diplomatic accreditation	ambassador	Thai language	Chinese language	Observations	Prime Minister of Thailand	Premier of the People's Republic of China	Term end
July 1, 1975				The governments in Beijing and Bangkok established diplomatic relations.	Seni Pramoj	Zhou Enlai	
1975	Kasem S. Kasemsri	th:หม่อมราชวงศ์เกษมสโมสร เกษมศรี	格森•沙摩颂•格森西亲王		Seni Pramoj	Zhou Enlai	1979
1979	Sakol Vanabriksha	นายสากล วรรณพฤกษ์	沙功•汪纳普	1968 he was ambassador to Washington, D.C., in 1979 he was ambassador to Canada, 1987 – 1993 he was ambassador in Berlin.	Kriangsak Chomanan	Hua Guofeng	1980
1980	Kosol Sindhvananda	นายโกศล สินธวานนท์	歌颂•信塔瓦暖		Prem Tinsulanonda	Zhao Ziyang	1982
1982	Orachun Tanaphong	นายอรชุน ตนะพงษ์	奥拉春•达纳蓬		Prem Tinsulanonda	Zhao Ziyang	1986
1986	Tej Bunnag	th:เตช บุนนาค	德•汶纳		Prem Tinsulanonda	Zhao Ziyang	1990
December 4, 1990	Montri Jalichandra	นายมนตรี ชาลีจันทร์	蒙迪•查里占	(concurrently) Montri Jalichandra	Chatichai Choonhavan	Li Peng	1993
February 25, 1994	Sawanit Kongsiri	นายสวนิต คงศิริ	雄威倪•孔诗礼		Suchinda Kraprayoon	Li Peng	1998
March 18, 1997	Nikhom Tantemsapya	นายนิคม ตันเต็มทรัพย์	倪琨•谭德萨		Chuan Leekpai	Li Peng	2001
February 16, 2001	Don Pramudwinai	นายดอน ปรมัตถ์วินัย	敦•帕马威奈		Thaksin Shinawatra	Zhu Rongji	2004
2004	Chulaphong Nonsrichai	นายจุลพงศ์ โนนศรีชัย	祝立鹏•暖西猜	Chulaphong Nonsrichai, vice-minister for the Foreign Ministry	Thaksin Shinawatra	Wen Jiabao	2007
2007	Rathakit Manathat	th:รัฐกิจ มานะทัต	马纳塔		Surayud Chulanont	Wen Jiabao	2010
July 30, 2010	Piamsak Milintachinda	นายเปี่ยมศักดิ์ มิลินทจินดา			Samak Sundaravej	Wen Jiabao 2011	
January 16, 2012	Wiboon Khusakul นายวิบูลย์ คูสกุล			Yingluck Shinawatra	Wen Jiabao 2014		
April 14, 2015	Theerakun Niyom นายธีรกุล นิยม			Prayut Chan-o-cha	Li Keqiang 2016		
June 7, 2017	Piriya Khempon นายพิริยะ เข็มพล			Prayut Chan-o-cha	Li Keqiang 2019		
November 22, 2019	Atthayut Srisamut	นายอรรถยุทธ์ ศรีสมุทร			Prayut Chan-o-cha	Li Keqiang	2023
2024	Chatchai Viriyavejakul	นายฉัตรชัย วิริยเวชกุล				Li Qiang	

== See also ==
- China–Thailand relations
