= Helen Hoang (economist) =

Vietnamese-Australian economist and author

- Born: Vietnam
- Occupations: Economist, author

Academic background
- Education: Graduate Institute of International and Development Studies; Vietnam National University (MBA); Australian National University (PhD)
- Thesis: Essays in Innovation, Trade and Determinants of Growth (2021)
- Doctoral advisor: Warwick McKibbin

Helen Hoang is a Vietnamese-Australian economist, author, and education entrepreneur based in Canberra. Her work focuses on economic education, public policy and the use of storytelling and digital technology to make economics accessible to children and young people.

== Early life and education ==
Hoang grew up in Vietnam and eventually immigrated to Australia. She earned her Doctor of Philosophy (Ph.D.) in Economics from the Australian National University (ANU) in 2021. Her doctoral research was supervised by Professor Warwick McKibbin, an economist and Director of the Centre for Applied Macroeconomic Analysis at ANU.

Her doctoral thesis, Essays in Innovation, Trade and Determinants of Growth, examined the roles of innovation, firm growth, gender, access to credit, and environmental outcomes among small and medium-sized enterprises in Vietnam.

In addition to her doctoral degree, Hoang holds three master's degrees in complementary fields. She completed an International Executive Master in Development Studies at the Graduate Institute of International and Development Studies in Geneva, Switzerland, in 2010; a Master of Business Administration from Vietnam National University, Hanoi, in 2012; and a Master of Public Policy (Economics) from the Crawford School of Public Policy at the Australian National University.

== Economic education ==
In 2024, Hoang founded EconTech – Economics for Kids, an education initiative that introduces economics and financial literacy through books, digital games, storytelling and practical learning programmes.

She is the author of Economics for Kids: Lessons from Fables and Fairy Tales, which uses traditional stories and Canberra landmarks to explain concepts including scarcity, choice, opportunity cost, incentives, saving, inequality, trade, public goods, technology and artificial intelligence. The series is primarily intended for children aged eight to thirteen.

Hoang also developed MBA Kids, an educational programme focused on economics, finance, entrepreneurship, leadership and technology. Her later work, Elfonomics: The Enchanted Christmas Adventures in Economics, introduces economic ideas through Christmas-themed stories.

In 2025, Hoang founded HP GlobalX, an education and publishing company. In the same year, EconTech received an Innovation Connect grant from the Australian Capital Territory Government to support the development of educational economics games for children.

Hoang has advocated for teaching financial literacy alongside economic literacy and ethics. In an article published by The Ethics Centre, she argued that children should learn not only how to manage money, but also how economic decisions affect other people, communities and society.

== Selected publications ==
=== Research ===
- Essays in Innovation, Trade and Determinants of Growth. Doctoral thesis, Australian National University, 2021.

=== Books ===
- Economics for Kids: Lessons from Fables and Fairy Tales – Volume 1.
- Economics for Kids: Lessons from Fables and Fairy Tales – Volume 2.
- Economics for Kids mini-book series
- Elfonomics: The Enchanted Christmas Adventures in Economics.

=== Forthcoming works ===
- Economics for Teens series.
- Mythonomics: Economic Tales from Ancient Wisdom – Volume 1.
- Mythonomics: Economic Tales from Ancient Wisdom – Volume 2.
