= South Pacific Applied Geoscience Commission =

The Pacific Islands Applied Geoscience Commission (SOPAC) was an inter-governmental regional organization dedicated to providing services to promote sustainable development in the countries it serves. In 2010, its functions had been transferred to the Pacific Community (SPC) and the Pacific Regional Environment Programme (SPREP), thus ending SOPAC as a separate entity. Today, SOPAC is a division of the SPC with its main office in Suva, Fiji.

== History ==
SOPAC was created by the conclusion of a 1990 multilateral treaty known as the Agreement establishing the South Pacific Applied Geoscience Commission. The treaty was concluded and signed on 10 October 1990 in Tarawa, Kiribati. It was signed by representatives of the governments of Australia, Cook Islands, Fiji, Guam, Federated States of Micronesia, Kiribati, Marshall Islands, New Zealand, Papua New Guinea, Solomon Islands, Tonga, Tuvalu, Vanuatu, and Western Samoa.

Since SOPAC's foundation, American Samoa, France, French Polynesia, Nauru, New Caledonia, Niue, Northern Mariana Islands, Palau, Pitcairn Islands, Tokelau, United States, and Wallis and Futuna have accepted the Agreement and thereby joined SOPAC.

== Activity ==
SOPAC focuses on assisting SPC members in three key program areas, Ocean and Islands, Community Lifelines and Community Risk.

- Ocean and Islands is focused on research, development and management of non-living resources in ocean and island systems addressing issues relating to seabed resources, energy, maritime boundary delimitation, and monitoring of ocean processes.
- Community Lifelines is a diversified program that strengthens national capacities in energy, water and sanitation, information and communications.
- Community Risk is a comprehensive program aimed at reduction of community vulnerability through improved hazard assessment and risk management.

Benefits accrue to SPC members directly through provision of basic geological knowledge and indirectly, through improvements in land and ocean use, leading to improved health through water and sanitation provision, wealth generation through the development of mineral resources, hazard and disaster management and sustainable development by taking into account the geo-environmental impacts of development.

Any island member can request assistance from SOPAC which is funded by member-country contributions and supported by the following donors: Australia, Fiji, Canada, France, Ireland, Japan, New Zealand, the Office of US Foreign Disaster Assistance, Taiwan, the United Kingdom, the Commonwealth Secretariat, the European Union, and certain UN agencies.

== Major projects ==
Environmental Vulnerability Index
SOPAC has contributed to the development of EVI to provide a new global indicator related to environmental issues.

Reducing Vulnerabilities in Pacific ACP states
This project, based on three components, Water, Risks, and Aggregate, is also providing assistance in Bathymetry mapping, Remote sensing, Geographic Information Systems and the installation of open source web based map servers (Geospatial Content Management System) for fourteen Pacific Islands Countries.

== Notable Members ==
Cristelle Pratt Director from 2004 - 2010
