= Ian Young (ocean engineer) =

Australian academic (born 1957)

Ian Young AO FTSE
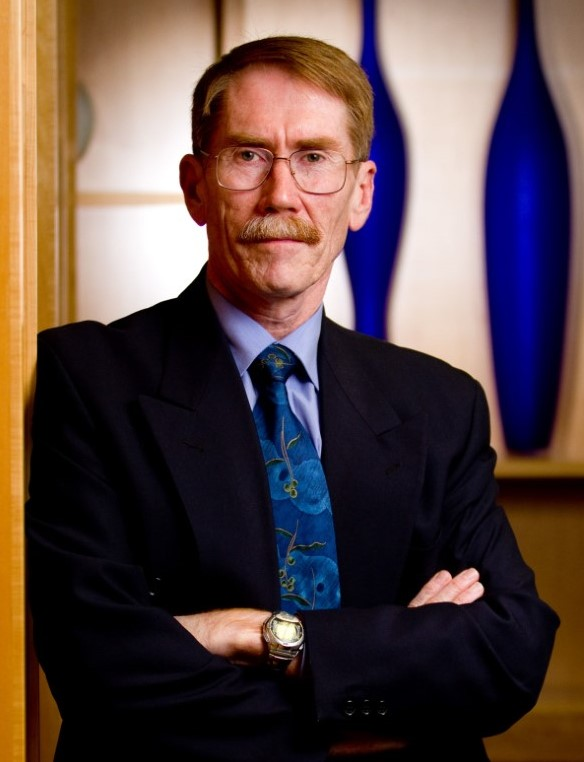
- Young in 2019
- Born: Melbourne, Victoria, Australia
- Occupation: Academic
- Title: Kernot Professor of Engineering

Academic background
- Education: BE(Hons) (1979); MEngSc (1982); PhD (1984)
- Alma mater: Pimlico State High School; James Cook University

Academic work
- Discipline: Civil engineering
- Sub-discipline: Ocean and coastal engineering
- Institutions: University of Melbourne

Ian Robert Young AO is an Australian ocean engineering expert and academic. He is the Kernot Professor of Engineering at the University of Melbourne. He previously held the administrative roles of vice-chancellor of Swinburne University of Technology from 2003 to 2011 and vice-chancellor of the Australian National University from 2011 to 2016.

Young's field of research is ocean engineering and particularly the role of wind-generated ocean waves. His work has focused on the development of global wave prediction models, extreme wind and wave conditions, tropical cyclone generated waves, nearshore sea states and the role of global winds and waves in climate change.

Young is an Honorary Fellow of Engineers Australia, a Fellow of the Academy of Technological Sciences and Engineering, received the Centenary Medal "in recognition for his services to research" in 2000 and became an Officer in the General Division of the Order of Australia in 2012 for his "services to higher education and research". He was awarded the Lorenz G. Straub medal for research in Hydraulic Engineering in 1986, and has been ranked by Engineers Australia as one of Australia's top 100 Engineers. In 2017, he was awarded the Kevin Stark medal for excellence in Coastal and Ocean Engineering.

== Early life and education ==
Young was born in Cunnamulla, a small town in South Western Queensland in late 1950s. He studied Civil Engineering at James Cook University. He completed three degrees at James Cook, graduating with BE(Hons) (1979), MEngSc (1982) and PhD (1984).

== Research and career ==
Young was a postdoctoral research fellow at the Max Planck Institute for Meteorology, Hamburg Germany from 1983 to 1984, where he studied under Klaus Hasselmann.

Young returned to Australia in 1984 and took up a teaching and research role at the Australian Defence Force Academy. At this time, Young's research focused on the development of global numerical wave models, the development of nonlinear wave processes, shallow water waves and tropical cyclone wave models. His work on spectral wave models underpinned the development of today's global models such as WaveWatch. His field research at Lake George near Canberra pioneered understanding of the growth of waves in finite depth conditions and has become a standard approach for engineering design in such situations.

In 1999, he was appointed to the role of executive dean of the faculty of Engineering, Computer and Mathematical Sciences at the University of Adelaide and subsequently also became pro vice-chancellor in 2001. In 2003 he became the second vice-chancellor of Swinburne University of Technology in Melbourne, where he served until 2011 when he became the eleventh vice-chancellor of the Australian National University in Canberra. In 2016 he returned to Melbourne to take up the position of Kernot Professor of Engineer at the University of Melbourne.

Following 2010, Young's research has focused on the role of ocean wind and waves in climate and climate change. This work has largely been achieved by building long-term databases of satellite observations of the ocean from altimeter, radiometer and scatterometer instruments. A series of publications in this field have highlighted changes in global wind speed and wave height climates over the past 30 years and pioneered this field of research.

=== Australian National University ===
Young's period as vice-chancellor of the Australian National University has been called controversial. Internally, Young set out to restructure the finances and administrative structures of the institution, a process which required financial restraint and a voluntary early retirement scheme in 2014. Externally, Young became chair of the Group of Eight in 2014, a time when the Australian Government proposed the deregulation of Australia's university system. The Group of Eight became a strong supporter of this policy and hence Young was a public advocate. Ultimately, the controversial proposal was unable to pass the Australian Senate and hence did not come into effect.

=== Business activities ===
Outside of his university research roles, Young is also involved in business activities. He is the president and CEO of Conviro, president of CloudCampus and chair of the board of VERNet.

== Awards and honors ==
- 1986 - Lorenz G. Straub medal for research in Hydraulic Engineering
- 1998 - Fellow of the Institution of Engineers of Australia
- 2001 - Fellow of the Australian Academy of Technological Sciences and Engineering
- 2000 - Centenary Medal, Australian Government
- 2011 - Honorary Fellow, Engineers Australia
- 2012 - National Medal for Education by the Vietnamese Government
- 2012 - Officer of the Order of Australia, AO
- 2017 - Keven Stark medal for excellence in Coast and Ocean Engineering

== Selected publications ==
- Young, I.R., Rosenthal, W. and Ziemer, F., 1985, "A Three-Dimensional Analysis of Marine Radar Images for the Determination of Ocean Wave Directionality and Surface Currents", Journal of Geophysical Research, Vol. 90, No. C1, 1049–1060.
- Young, I.R., Hasselmann, S. and Hasselmann, K., 1987, "Computations of the response of a wave spectrum to a sudden change in wind direction", Jnl. Physical Oceanography, Vol. 17, No.9, 1317–1338.
- Young, I.R. and van Vledder, G.Ph., 1993, "A Review of the Central Role of Nonlinear Interactions in Wind-Wave Evolution", Phil. Trans. Roy. Soc. Lond. A, 342, 505–524.
- Young, I.R. and Verhagen, L.A., 1996, "The Growth of Fetch Limited Waves in Water of Finite Depth. Part I: Total Energy and Peak Frequency", Coastal Engineering, 28, 47–78.
- Young, I.R. and Burchell, G.P., 1996, "Hurricane Generated Waves as Observed by Satellite", Ocean Engineering, 23, 8, 761–776.
- Young, I.R. and Verhagen, L.A., 1996, "The Growth of Fetch Limited Waves in Water of Finite Depth. Part I: Total Energy and Peak Frequency", Coastal Engineering, 28, 47–78.
- Young, I.R., Zieger, S. and Babanin, A.V., 2011, "Global trends in wind speed and wave height", Science, 332, 451–455.
- Young, I.R. and Ribal, A., 2019, "Multi-platform evaluation of global trends in wind speed and wave height", Science, 364, 548–552.
- Ribal, A. and Young, I.R., 2019, "33 years of globally calibrated wave height and wind speed data based on altimeter observations", Sci. Data, 6, 77.

Academic offices
Preceded by Ian Chubb	11th Vice-Chancellor of the Australian National University; 2011–2016	Succeeded by Brian Schmidt
