= W. D. Borrie =

Australian academic and demographer

W. D. Borrie CBE FASSA FACE
- Born: 2 September 1913; Waimate, New Zealand
- Died: 1 January 2000 (aged 86)
- Spouse: Alice Hazel Muller

Academic background
- Thesis: The military defence of New Zealand, 1850-1914 (1936)

Academic work
- Institutions: Australian National University
- Doctoral students: Lloyd Robson; John Caldwell

Wilfred David "Mick" Borrie CBE FASSA FACE (2 September 1913 – 1 January 2000) was a New Zealand-born Australian demographer and academic.

== Education ==
Borrie was educated at Waitaki Boys' High School, Oamaru, completing his education at the University of Otago and University of Cambridge.His Master's thesis The military defence of New Zealand, 1850–1914, was completed at Otago in 1936. Borrie was president of the Otago University Students' Association in 1936.

== Career ==
Borrie moved to Sydney in 1941 where he taught Social History at the University of Sydney until 1947.

Borrie joined the Australian National University in 1948. Borrie founded the Department of Demography in 1952, where from 1957 he was Professor of Demography and Chair of Demography, the first such worldwide. He retired in 1978.

In 1961, Borrie delivered the third in the annual series of ABC lectures (renamed the Boyer Lectures) on "The Crowding World".

Borrie, keen to extend population studies throughout Australia, encouraged the formation of the Australian Population Association (APA) in 1980. Borrie remained patron of the APA until he died.

== Personal ==
Borrie was born on 2 September 1913 at Waimate, New Zealand, the son of Peter William Borrie and Isabella Doig. Borrie married Alice Hazel Muller in 1941, and had one daughter. He died on 1 January 2000.

Borrie was interviewed in 1989 by Barrie York about his early life and career. The recording of this can be found at the National Library of Australia.

== Honours and awards ==
- 1950 Elected Fellow of the Academy of the Social Sciences in Australia
- 1969 Officer of the Order of the British Empire for service to social science.
- 1975 Honorary degree of Doctor of Science, University of Tasmania
- 1979 Commander of the Order of the British Empire for service to social science.
- 1979 Honorary degree of Doctor of Science in Economics, University of Sydney
- 1996 IUSSP Laureate.

== Memorials and legacy ==
=== Borrie Prize ===
"The W.D. Borrie Prize is awarded to the best student paper on a population-related topic".
