= Sang Phathanothai =

Thai politician

- สังข์ พัธโนทัย
- Born: 4 November 1915; Samut Prakan, Siam
- Died: 4 June 1986 (aged 70); Bangkok, Thailand
- Occupations: Politician; journalist

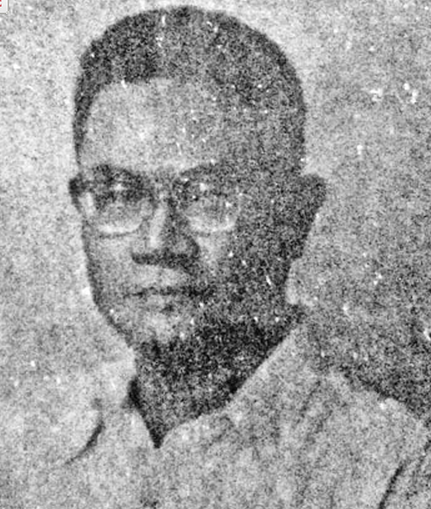
Sang Phatthanothai

Sang Phathanothai (Thai: สังข์ พัธโนทัย, RTGS: Sang Phatthanothai; 1915 – June 1986) was a Thai politician, union leader, and journalist. He was one of the closest advisors to Field Marshal Phibunsongkhram.

In his early 20s Sang began to write regularly on political and international subjects and became a daily commentator for the national radio station. He became famous thanks to his radio show Mr. Mun and Mr. Kong and soon was appointed the head of the radio and newspaper sections of the Thai Government Publicity Department.

In 1938, shortly after becoming prime minister, Phibunsongkhram named Sang the official government spokesman and put him in charge of all government propaganda. It was in this capacity that when Thailand had to declare war against the Allies in World War II, Sang had the distinction of reading the formal declaration of war over the radio on January 25, 1942.

When the war ended the Allies wanted to prosecute Sang, along with Phibunsongkhram and a few others, for war crimes. However, as Phibunsongkhram had during the war refused Japanese pressure to arrest alleged resistance leaders and had allegedly looked the other way as Pridi Banomyong, the leader of the Free Thai Movement, developed contacts with the Allies during the war, and with public opinion favourable to all those arrested by the Allies, the Thai Supreme Court ruled that they could not be prosecuted under a war crime statute imposing the death sentence that had been enacted after the end of the war, and ordered their release.

In 1947 Phibun became prime minister once again and invited Sang to join the cabinet. However Sang refused, preferring to remain Phibun's confidant and advisor. He decided to take only the official post of President, and later General Secretary, of the Thai National Traders Union Congress.

With a reduced formal role in government and more time available to other projects, Sang turned himself to journalism, setting up a daily newspaper that he himself edited: Satienraparb ("Forever") soon exerted considerable influence in Thai politics.

In 1956, with Phibunsongkhram's government openly pro-western and anti-Chinese, Sang and Phibun devised a strategy to establish a backdoor informal communication channel with the Chinese government. They agreed to send two of Sang's children to be brought up under the auspices of Chinese Premier Zhou Enlai as his wards. A daughter aged eight and a son aged twelve secretly travelled through Burma to Beijing. Unfortunately for the children, a sudden change of government resulting from a coup, meant that their father was arrested for his pro-Beijing policies and his newspaper articles about China. Sang's arrest meant loss of contact with Premier Zhou Enlai and consequently with his children. Sang's daughter, Sirin Phathanothai, would later write a book, The Dragon's Pearl, about her experiences growing up among China's elite.

Following the death in 1963 of dictator Sarit Thanarat (whose government arrested Sang), the political climate eased somewhat in Thailand. It was at this time that Sang, after being under arrest for seven years, was finally brought to trial before a military tribunal. The trial, open to the public and widely covered by Thai media at the time, was the first of many trials for the intellectuals, writers, journalists, lawyers, and university professors who had been arrested without any formal charges and sent to jail for several years under Sarit's military dictatorship.

Sang was specifically accused of publishing subversive and seditious articles on China from October 1956 to September 1958. Sang conducted his own defense and shortly after cross-examining the prosecution witnesses, the military judges dismissed all charges.

After his release from jail, Sang remained involved in politics until his death in 1986.

== Sources ==
- Phathanothai, Sirin The Dragon's Pearl. New York: Simon & Schuster, 2001. ISBN 0-7432-1798-5
- Terry Fredrickson (19 January 1998). Post Tips. Bangkok Post.
- Sulak Sivarasa (8 September 2009). Karuna Kusalasaya: May 1920 - August 2009. A virtuous life in the service of humanity. Bangkok Post.
