= Lloyd Robson =

Australian historian and academic

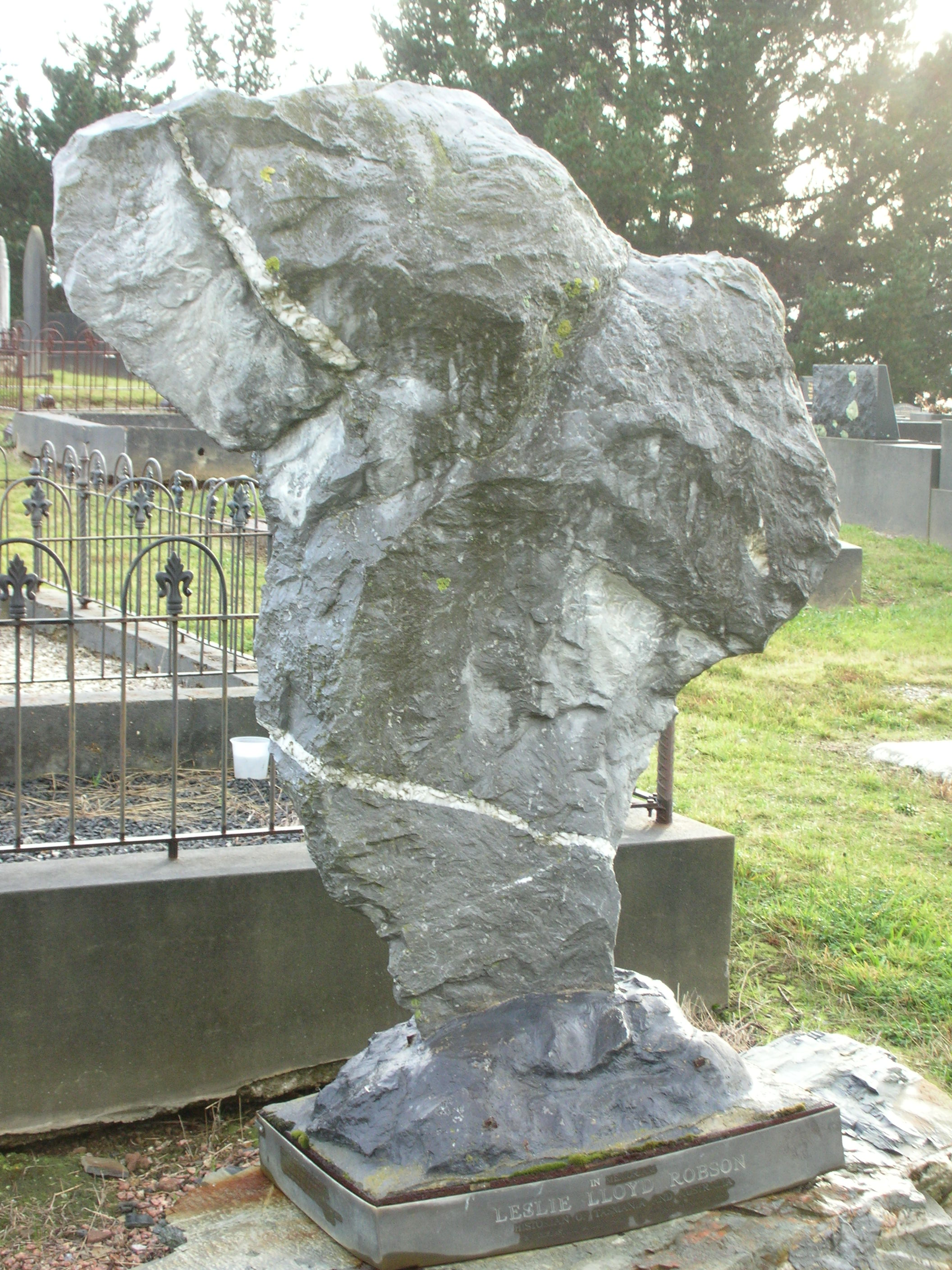
Lloyd Robson's headstone at the old cemetery in Penguin, Tasmania

Leslie Lloyd Robson (1931–1990) was an Australian historian and academic at the University of Melbourne. He pioneered new techniques of quantitative history, and wrote A History of Tasmania, a two volume work on the history of Australia's island state.

== Early life ==
Robson was born in Ulverstone, Tasmania, on 24 July 1931. His parents, George Leslie Robson, and Laurel Grace (née Revell) were farmers, and Robson grew up on a farm at West Pine, near Penguin. He was educated at Devonport High School and the University of Tasmania, where he completed a Bachelor of Arts in 1953, and a Master of Arts in 1955.

During the 1950s Robson undertook postgraduate study at the University of London, where he met and married his first wife, Margaret Ilona Horden. He completed a Ph.D. at the Australian National University in 1963, supervised by Manning Clark and W. D. Borrie. His thesis examined convicts transported to New South Wales and Van Diemen's Land in 1787–1852. It was later published as The Convict Settlers of Australia (1965).

== Academic career ==
Robson worked at the University of Melbourne from 1964 until his retirement. There he taught mostly Australian history, and supervised students undertaking higher degrees by research. He pioneered techniques of quantitative history, as evidenced in his doctoral thesis and his later work, The First AIF (1970).

He was a significant protagonist in the Australian history wars, which debated the interpretation of the colonisation of Australia, especially in regards to the impact on Aboriginal Australians and Torres Strait Islanders.

== Later life ==
Robson died of cancer aged 59, on 22 August 1990 in Fitzroy, Victoria. The funeral was held at the Uniting Church, Penguin, Tasmania, and he was buried in the old cemetery overlooking the town.
