= Don VandenBerg =

Dr. Don VandenBerg is Professor Emeritus of astronomy (Ph.D. Australian National University) at the department of physics and astronomy at the University of Victoria, British Columbia, Canada. He is internationally acclaimed for his work on modelling stars of different size and composition.

Using basic input physics, such as nuclear reaction rates and opacities, VandenBerg uses computer models to help understand the structure and evolution of stars. These models, which are tightly constrained by observations, provide insight into stellar populations and will ultimately be used to synthesize the stellar populations of distant galaxies.

Vandenberg has the most-cited research papers of any astronomer in Canada. His stellar isochrones resulting from his models are widely used throughout the world.
