= Cristelle Pratt =

Fijian environmental expert

- Occupations: Assistant Secretary-General for the Environment and Climate Action at the Organisation of African, Caribbean and Pacific States (OACPS).
- Years active: 30

Cristelle Pratt, a Fijian national, is Assistant Secretary-General for the Environment and Climate Action at the Organisation of African, Caribbean and Pacific States (OACPS), based in Brussels. She is a former Deputy Secretary General of the Pacific Islands Forum (PIF).

== Early life ==
Cristelle Pratt obtained degrees in marine law and policy from Dalhousie University in Nova Scotia, Canada and in geoscience from the Australian National University in Canberra.

== Career ==
After completing her education, Pratt held various positions with the private sector and with the Fijian government. She worked as a consultant for organizations such as the Council of Regional Organisations in the Pacific (Crop), World Bank, UN Agencies and Australian Aid in the Asia and the Pacific regions, in areas such as climate change, disaster risk management and ocean governance.

In 2000, she joined the South Pacific Applied Geoscience Commission (SOPAC), an organization serving 21 countries and territories, becoming director from 2004 to 2010. SOPAC, now a division of the Pacific Community (SPC), had the lead responsibility in Oceania for disaster risk management. In 2012 she became Deputy Secretary General of the Pacific Islands Forum (PIF), located in Suva, Fiji, on a fixed-term six-year contract. In this capacity she supported the development of a Pacific Island regional agenda, known as the Framework for Pacific Regionalism, as well as the development of a narrative on the Blue Pacific Continent.

In 2020, Pratt joined the OACPS as head of the newly created Environment and Climate Action Department. This aims to support member countries to carry out climate change adaptation and mitigation; protect biodiversity; promote the sustainable use and management of natural resources; strengthen ocean governance; and build resilience to disasters.
