= Naomi Rono =

- Born: Kenya
- Citizenship: Kenya
- Education: Strathmore University (Bachelor of Commerce); Australian National University (Diploma in Public Administration) (Master of Public Policy); University of Amsterdam (Diploma in Development Economics and International Development)
- Occupations: Public policy consultant and development economist
- Years active: 2007–present
- Title: Senior Adviser to the Executive Director of the World Bank Group

Naomi Rono is a Kenyan public policy professional and development economist, who works as a Senior Adviser in the Office of the executive director at World Bank Group, based in Washington, D.C.

== Background and education ==
Naomi was born in Kenya and attended Kenyan schools for her pre-university education. She attended Strathmore University, graduating with a Bachelor of Commerce (BCom) degree, in 2006. She later obtained a postgraduate diploma in Public Administration, obtained in 2013 from the Australian National University (ANU), in Canberra. The next year, she obtained a Master of Public Policy (MPA) degree, also from ANU. She also holds a postgraduate certification in Development Economics and International Development, awarded by the University of Amsterdam in 2014.

== Work experience ==
Naomi worked as an accounting solutions specialist at IQplus Kenya Limited, a company that offers ERP solutions, including the automation of books of accounts and key business operations, based in Nairobi, from March 2007 until June 2011. From August 2011 until July 2017, she was employed as a Senior Fiscal Policy Officer at the Institute of Certified Public Accountants of Kenya (ICPAK), a Kenyan statutory institution mandated to develop and regulate the accountancy profession in Kenya. In August 2017, she was appointed by the Cabinet Secretary for the National Treasury to represent the Republic of Kenya as an adviser to the Executive Director for the Africa Group 1 Constituency on the Boards of the World Bank Group, where she still serves as of November 2022.

== Other considerations ==
In 2017, Rono was named among the "Top 40 Women Under 40 in Kenya", by Business Daily Africa, an English-language daily business newspaper.
