= Colin Butler =

Australian epidemiologist

Colin David Butler is a co-founder of the non-governmental organization BODHI (Benevolent Organisation for Development, Health and Insight), which has autonomous branches in the United States and Australia. Butler was a professor of public health at the University of Canberra from November 2012 until July 2016. In 2018 he was appointed as an honorary professor at the National Centre for Epidemiology & Population Health at Australian National University,. He is a former senior research fellow in global health at the School of Health and Social Development at Deakin University.

Butler studies the intersection of sustainability, globalization, and health. His main research interest lies in trying to find ways to advance sustainable global health.

== Training and education ==
Butler obtained a Bachelor of Medical Sciences (Hons) degree in 1984 and a Bachelor of Medicine degree in 1987, both from the University of Newcastle, NSW, Australia.

In 1985, prior to his final year of medical school, he spent ten months outside of Australia, mostly studying health issues in low-income countries. This included time in Nigeria with the health arms of two Christian missions, as well as the University of Ilorin, and in Nepal with the Britain Nepal Medical Trust. After graduating, he worked for several years in rural general practice in Tasmania. His longstanding interest in global health led him to pursue a Diploma in Tropical Medicine and Hygiene (DTM&H), which he received from the Royal College of Physicians in 1990. In 1997, he obtained a Master of Science degree in epidemiology from the London School of Hygiene and Tropical Medicine. While there, his main mentor was Professor Tony McMichael.

In 2002, Butler completed a multidisciplinary PhD at the Australian National University, entitled "Inequality and sustainability". His thesis argued that the unequal distribution of global political and economic influence facilitates "environmental brinkmanship," whereby the wealthy and powerful risk global environmental change of a degree that threatens the fabric of civilization. These ideas are components of what has recently been called "planetary health."

While studying for his PhD, Butler was awarded the 2001 Borrie Prize by the Australian Population Association for "the best student paper on a population-related topic". Butler's winning essay traced the decline of Malthusian thinking within demography.

== Career ==
In 1989, Butler co-founded BODHI with the late Susan Woldenberg. These organizations, one in the US and one in Australia, work in the field of international health, primary health care, and education. BODHI identifies itself as the third or fourth oldest Buddhist influenced development NGO[s] based in the West.

Butler contributed to the Millennium Ecosystem Assessment, which was requested by United Nations Secretary General Kofi Annan in 2001, both in the conceptual framework ("Ecosystems and Human Well-Being") and the scenarios working groups.

In 2009, the French Environmental Health Association named Butler one of "a hundred doctors for the planet."

In 2010, Butler was awarded an Australian Research Council Future Fellowship, which "supports research in areas of critical national importance by giving outstanding researchers incentives to conduct their research in Australia. The aim of Future Fellowships is "to attract and retain the best and brightest mid-career researchers." Butler's grant project, which he completed in 2015, was entitled "Health and Sustainability: Australia in a Global Context."

In 2014, Butler co-founded an international research network based at the University of Canberra called Health-Earth. The network has six major research themes: poverty, climate change, infectious disease, ecosystem disruptions, security, and transformation.

Also in 2014, he also became the first Australian contributor to the Intergovernmental Panel on Climate Change to be arrested for civil disobedience, in opposition to Australian government policies concerning climate change.

In 2018 he received the Tony McMichael Public Health Ecology and Environment Award, from the Public Health Association of Australia.

== Writing ==
Butler has published over 150 articles and book chapters and the following 2 edited books:

- Butler C. D., Dixon J., Capon A. G. Healthy People, Places and Planet. Reflections based on AJ (Tony) McMichael's four decades of contribution to epidemiological understanding. Canberra: Australian National University Press (2015).
- Butler C. D., editor. Climate Change and Global Health. Wallingford, UK: CABI (2014), 315 pages. ISBN 9781780642659."

For a selected bibliography of Butler's other writings, see the External Links section.
