= Rathakit Manathat =

Thai career diplomat and judge

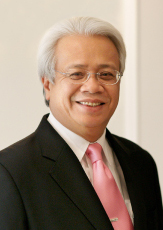

President of the Chamber of Supreme Administrative Court of Thailand
- Incumbent
- Assumed office 1 October 2022

Thai Ambassador to the China
- In office 2007–2010

Personal details
- Born: 12 December 1952 (age 73) Kalasin, Thailand
- Spouse: Thanaporn Manathat
- Children: Thana P. Manathat; Pat Sharamon Manathat
- Education: Thammasart University (L.L.B. Honors); Barrister at Law; Thammasart University (M.A. International Relations); Australian National University (GradD in International Law)

Rathakit Manathat (Thai: รัฐกิจ มานะทัต, born December 12, 1952) was appointed as justice of the Supreme Administrative Court of Thailand since 2016 and became President of the Chamber since October 2022. Prior to his current appointment, he was the Ambassador to the People's Republic of China and the Foreign Ministry Spokesperson.

== Early life ==
Justice Manathat was born on December 12, 1952, in Kalasin Province. He completed his L.L.B. (Honors) and M.A. in International Relations from Thammasat University. He was called to the Bar of the Kingdom of Thailand in the year 1977. He also received Graduate Diploma in International Law from The Australian National University under the University's scholarship. Prior to joining the Ministry of Foreign Affairs, he was a lecturer at Chulalongkorn University and Kasetsart University.

== Diplomatic Career ==
Rathakit joined Thailand's Foreign Service in 1979. Between 2002 and 2013 he served as Ambassador Extraordinary and Plenipotentiary of Thailand to People's Republic of China, Switzerland, Turkey and Laos PDR. Prior to the Ambassadorship, he served as Thai Consul General to Hong Kong during the Handover of Hong Kong to the People's Republic of China.

== Private Sector ==
Rathakit was member of the Board of Directors of PTT Exploration and Production Public Company Limited (PTTEP) between 2009 and 2011. He was also member of the Board of Directors Tourism Authority of Thailand in 2002.

== Orders and decorations ==
- Knight Grand Cordon (Special Class) of the Most Exalted Order of the White Elephant
- Knight Grand Cordon (Special Class) of the Most Noble Order of the Crown of Thailand
