= Kirsten Parris =

Australian ecologist (born 1969)

Kirsten M. Parris (born 1969) is an Australian urban ecologist, Professor of Urban Ecology in the School of Ecosystem and Forest Sciences at the University of Melbourne and an Honorary Associate of the Royal Botanic Gardens Victoria. She also leads the National Environmental Science Program's Research Hub for Clean Air and Urban Landscapes (CAUL).

== Early life and education ==
She was born in Kew, Victoria in 1969. In 1993 she received a BSc (Hons) from the University of Melbourne, and in 1994 a BA from the same institution. She was awarded a PhD from the Australian National University in 2000.

== Career ==
She worked as a lecturer and researcher in Australia and the United States before joining the University of Melbourne in 2007.

She has received research grants from the Australian Research Council, the Department of the Environment and Energy, and other government agencies. She has published one book as sole author, Ecology of Urban Environments (Wiley Blackwell, 2016), one edited volume, Cities for People and Nature (CAUL Hub, 2020), more than 60 research papers and five book chapters.

Her research has enjoyed considerable media attention, with over 300 reports transmitted by Australian and international outlets.

== Scholarly contributions ==
Parris works on the ecology of urban areas with particular emphasis on amphibians, bioacoustics and animal communication, biological survey methods and ecological research ethics.

Parris is recognised as an especially effective science communicator. She won the British Ecological Society's Science Slam in 2016 and was a finalist in the 2004 Australian National Fresh Science Competition. She co-convenes the Ecological Society of Australia's Research Chapter for Science Communication.
