= Michael Cowling =

Australian mathematician

Michael George Cowling is an Australian pure mathematician who was born in Melbourne, Victoria, Australia in 1949. He gained a BSc (Hons) (1971) from the Australian National University and a PhD (1974) from Flinders University. After rising to the rank of professor at the University of Genoa, he became Professor of Pure Mathematics at the University of New South Wales in 1983. His work centers on harmonic analysis, representation theory, partial differential equations and geometry of Lie groups. He was awarded the Australian Mathematical Society Medal in 1989, and he was elected as a fellow of the Australian Academy of Science in 1993. From 2004 to 2006 he was President of the Australian Mathematical Society.

After stepping down as the Head of the School of Mathematics and Statistics at UNSW, he moved to the United Kingdom to accept the Mason Chair at the University of Birmingham. He returned to UNSW in 2010.

== Selected publications ==
- Cowling, Michael; Price, John (1984). "Bandwidth Versus Time Concentration: The Heisenberg-Pauli-Weyl Inequality". SIAM Journal on Mathematical Analysis. 15 (1): 151–165. Bibcode:1984SJMA...15..151C. doi:10.1137/0515012.
- Cowling, Michael; Dooley A. H.; Koranyi A.; Ricci F. (1991). "H-type groups and Iwasawa decompositions". Advances in Mathematics. 87 (1): 1–41. doi:10.1016/0001-8708(91)90060-K.
- Cowling, Michael; Haagerup, Uffe (October 1989). "Completely bounded multipliers of the Fourier algebra of a simple Lie group of real rank one". Inventiones Mathematicae. 96 (3): 507–549. Bibcode:1989InMat..96..507C. doi:10.1007/BF01393695. S2CID 121588098.
