= Sarah Pryke =

Australian scientist

Sarah Rosalind Pryke is a behavioural and evolutionary ecologist. A graduate of the University of Natal (South Africa), with a PhD from Göteborg University (Sweden), she is best known for her research on the evolution of sexual signals in the Red-collared widowbird and more recently research on maternal effects and the evolution of alternative reproductive strategies in the Gouldian finch.

== Career ==
Pryke began her postdoctoral career with a move to Australia in 2005. At this time she took up New South Global Postdoctoral Fellowship at the University of New South Wales. In 2007 she moved to Macquarie University to take up an ARC Postdoctoral Fellowship, followed in 2010 by an Innovation Research Fellowship awarded by Macquarie University. In 2012, Pryke obtained a faculty position at the Australian National University where she moved to establish her own research group and start and ARC Future Fellowship.

== Awards and recognition ==
- 2004 – Pitelka Award from the International Society for Behavioural Ecology
- 2005 – Christer Hemborg Award
- 2007 – L'Oréal Women in Science Fellowship Award
- 2011 – Christopher Barnard Award for Outstanding Contributions by a New Investigator from Association for the Study of Animal Behaviours

== Selected publications ==
- Pryke, S. R. 2013. Bird contests: from hatching to fertilisation. In: Animal Contests. Editors: I.C.W. Hardy & M. Briffa. Cambridge University Press, Cambridge pp. 287–303.
- Pryke S. R. & Rollins L. A. 2012. Mothers adjust offspring sex to match the quality of the rearing environment. Proceedings of the Royal Society of London B. 279: 4051–4057.
- Pryke S. R., Rollins L. A. & Griffith S. C. 2011. Context-dependent sex allocation: constraints on the expression and evolution of maternal allocation. Evolution. 65: 2792–2799.
- Pryke, S. R., Rollins, L. A. & Griffith, S. C. 2010. Females use multiple mating and genetically loaded sperm competition to target compatible genes. Science 329: 964–967.
- Pryke, S. R. 2010. Sex chromosome linkage of mate preferences and color signal maintains assortative mating between interbreeding finch morphs. Evolution 65: 1301–1310.
- Pryke, S. R. & Griffith, S. C. 2009. Postzygotic incompatibility drives sex allocation and maternal investment in a polymorphic finch. Science 323: 1605–1607.
- Pryke, S. R. & Griffith, S. C. 2009. Socially mediated trade-offs between aggression and parental effort in competing color morphs. American Naturalist 174: 455–464.
- Pryke, S. R. 2007. Sexual selection of ultraviolet and structural color signals. In: Reproductive biology and phylogeny of Aves. Editor: B. M. Jamieson. Science Publishers Inc., Enfield, USA. pp. 1–40.
- Pryke, S. R. & Griffith, S. C. 2006. Red dominates black: Agonistic signalling among head morphs in the colour polymorphic Gouldian finch. Proceedings of the Royal Society of London B. 273: 949–957.
- Pryke, S. R., Lawes, M. J. & Andersson, M. 2002. Multiple receivers, multiple ornaments and a trade-off between agonistic and epigamic signaling in a widowbird. American Naturalist 160: 683–691.
- Pryke, S. R. & Andersson, S. 2002. A generalized female bias for long tails in a short-tailed widowbird. Proceedings of the Royal Society of London B 269: 2141–2146.
- Pryke S. R., Andersson, S. & Lawes, M. J. 2002. Carotenoid status signaling in captive and wild red-collared widowbirds: independent effects of badge size and color. Behavioral Ecology 13: 622–631.
