= The Dragon's Pearl =

Autobiography by Sirin Phathanothai

- Author: Sirin Phathanothai and James Peck
- Publisher: Simon & Schuster
- Publication date: July 1, 1994
- ISBN: 0-671-79546-5

The Dragon's Pearl: Growing Up Among Mao's Reclusive Circle is a 1994 autobiography by Sirin Phathanothai with James Peck. It tells of Phathanothai's experiences growing up in the 1950s and 1960s among the leaders of China.

The book tells the story of how in 1956, when Bangkok-Beijing relations were tense at the height of the Cold War, Thailand was trying to survive the power struggle between China and the United States in Asia. The new Thai government desperately needed American money for its unstable economy, yet it could not ignore the threat posed by China, which had just demonstrated its strength in the Korean Peninsula. While the Thai government openly welcomed Americans and denounced China, the prime minister of Thailand secretly sent the two children of his principal adviser, Sang Phathanothai, to China as a goodwill offering and to be brought up there by Premier Zhou Enlai; thus replaying the act of making human pledge practiced in China throughout history.

The children became the wards of Premier Zhou Enlai. Sirin was 8 years old; her brother 12. The book relates how she was caught up in the Cultural Revolution in the mid-1960s. Accused of the crime of having been reared in a bourgeois Thai family and by the capitalist sympathizer Zhou, she was forced to denounce her family in public. Then, in an unforeseen turn of events, Sirin becomes a Communist Party heroine by saving two children in a fire -but she was required to announce that her deed was inspired by the teachings of Chairman Mao Zedong. Sirin's memoir provides a valuable eyewitness account of the Cultural Revolution.

== TV productions ==
The book was translated to several languages. A joint Thai-Chinese production made a TV mini-series adaptation that aired in Thai, Chinese and Japanese television. It was broadcast in Thailand in 1998 under the name of Mook Mangkorn.
