= Thomas Smith (finance professor) =

Australian finance academic (born 1958)

- Smith at PhD camp
- Born: 17 May 1958 (age 68)

Academic background
- Education: Stanford University (Ph.D. 1984)
- Influences: Michael Gibbons

Academic work
- Discipline: Financial economics
- Institutions: Macquarie University

Thomas (Tom) Smith (born 17 May 1958) is an Australian finance academic. He has been ranked as the number one finance academic in Australia and New Zealand by both the Journal of Financial Literature and the Pacific Basin Finance Journal.

== Biography ==
After undergraduate and postgraduate studies at the University of Queensland (Bachelor of Commerce (Honours) 1980, Masters in Financial Management 1982) where he was the recipient of numerous academic and merit awards. He completed his PhD studies at Stanford Graduate School of Business.

He has held appointments at Duke University (1988–1995), Australian Graduate School of Management (1995–2002), Australia National University (2003–2011) and the University of Queensland (2012–2017). At UQ Business School, he held the Frank Finn Chair in Finance.

Smith's current research includes work on environmental finance, stock volatility, market microstructure and dividend policy. Earlier interests are in the areas of asset pricing theory and tests, the design of markets and derivatives. His research has been published in the leading financial economic journals, including the Journal of Finance, Review of Financial Studies, Journal of Financial Economics, Journal of Accounting Research, Journal of Business, Journal of Law and Economics and the Journal of Financial and Quantitative Analysis.
