= Yang Hi Choe-Wall =

South Korean and Australian Koreanist (born 1932)

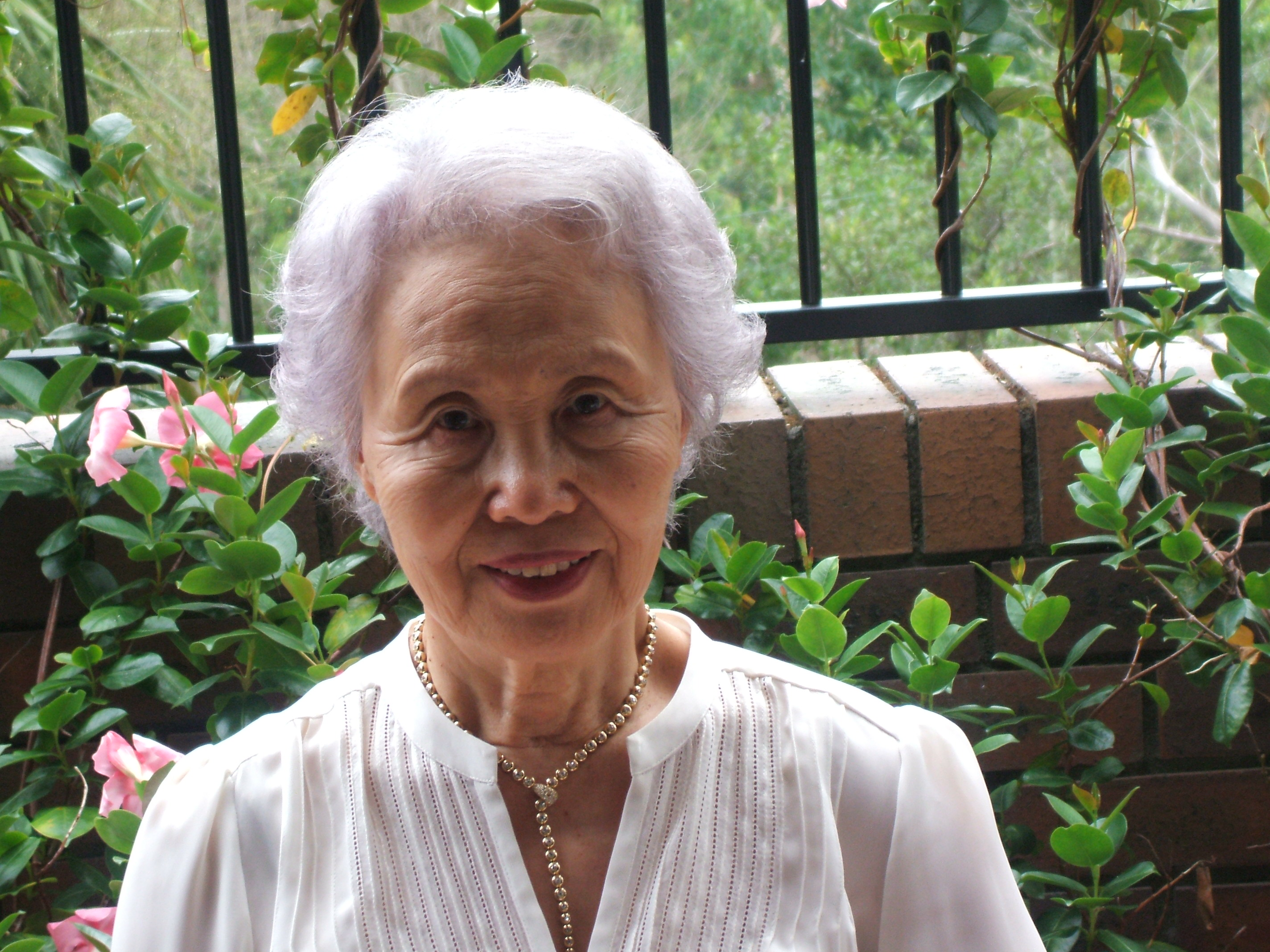
- Yang Hi Choe-Wall in Sydney, 2011
- Born: 1932 (age 93–94); Keijō, Korea, Empire of Japan
- Occupations: Writer, researcher and academic
- Known for: Korean classical literature

Korean name
- Hangul: 최양희
- Hanja: 崔洋姬
- RR: Choe Yanghui
- MR: Ch'oe Yanghŭi

Yang Hi Choe-Wall (Korean: 최양희; born 1932) is a South Korean and Australian academic, writer and researcher specialising in Korean literature of Chosŏn period (1392–1910). She was associate professor in the division of Pacific and Asian history, the Australian National University. Choe-Wall is the winner of the 2013 Daesan Literary Awards, who is now retired and living in Canberra, Australia.

== Career ==
Choe-Wall's undergraduate studies led to a BA (Hons) in English Language and Literature, following which she took up an appointment with Hongik University (Seoul), as a lecturer in English language.

In September 1965, Choe-Wall moved to Australia with her young daughter (Miki Wick-Kim) and son (Dai-Kyu Kim), having accepted an appointment with The Australian National University in Canberra as librarian of the Japanese collection in the Menzies Library, the university's principal research library.

Choe-Wall received her Master of Arts degree in Asian Studies from the Australian National University in 1974. Her thesis Hanjung-nok: Memoirs of a Yi Dynasty Court Lady was later published as Memoirs of a Korean Queen. In 1980 she did her Graduate Diploma in Library and Information Science at Charles Sturt University, New South Wales. Choe-Wall was awarded her PhD in Asian Studies (Sino-Korean Literature) from the Australian National University in 1985. Her PhD thesis was Hŏ Nansŏrhŏn (Heo Nanseolheon) and Her Hanshi – A study of the life and work of Hŏ Nansŏrhŏn – a late sixteenth-century Korean poet. This was published as Vision of a Phoenix.

In 1984 she was appointed lecturer in Korean at the Australian National University. This was followed by an appointment as fellow / associate professor of the Australian National University in 1993. She retired from the Australian National University in 1996, but as a visiting fellow of the university continued to work on the Encyclopaedia of Korea as project director and chief compiler until 1999. In 2013, she became a member of The Australian National University Emeritus Faculty.

Dr Yang Hi Choe-Wall's main research interest is the Korean literature of the Joseon period. She has published extensively and presented many papers on this subject at international conferences of Korean Studies, including the XXXII International Congress for Asia and North African Studies, Hamburg, 1986; The First Pacific Basin International Conference on Korean Studies, University of Hawaii, 1992; The 1993 International Korean Literature Conference, University of California at Berkeley; Translation of Korean Literary Works and their Diffusion in Europe, l'Universite Paris 7, Paris, 1994., etc.

== Awards ==
- The 2005 Korean Literature Translation Award for her work Vision of a Phoenix.
- The 2013 Daesan Literary Awards for her work The Jehol Diary.

== Selected works ==
OCLC/WorldCat Identities overview statistics for writings by and about Yang Hi Choe-Wall include approximately 19 works in 61 publications in 3 languages and 2,294 + library holdings. The books have been published primarily in English, but also in Korean and French.

- Memoirs of a Korean Queen, London, Routledge & Kegan Paul, 1985. ISBN 0-7103-0052-2.
- The Korea Fact Book (co-authored with Ray Wall and Stephen Wall), Sydney, Doubleday, 1988. ISBN 0-86824-368-X.
- 오스트레일리아의 역사, (co-translated with 문우상 of A Short History of Australia by Manning Clark, Penguin, 1986), Seoul, Eulyoo Publishing Co., 1990.
- Mémoires d'une reine de Corée, (translated by Claude Bouygues of Memoirs of a Korean Queen by Yang Hi Choe-Wall), Paris, Éditions Philippe Picquier, 1996. ISBN 2-87730-274-1.
- Vision of a Phoenix: The Poems of Hŏ Nansŏrhŏn (Cornell East Asia Series, 117), Ithaca, New York, Cornell University, 2003. ISBN 1-885445-42-3 hc.
- Memoirs of the Red Queen, London, Kegan Paul, 2004. ISBN 0-7103-1159-1.
- The Jehol Diary (Chapter 1–3 of Yŏrha ilgi by Pak Chiwŏn, (1737–1805), translated with introduction and notes, Folkestone (UK), Global Oriental and Leiden, Brill Publishers, 2010. ISBN 978-1-906876-17-3.
- The Encyclopaedia of Korea (1999), ANU – Digital Collections: Open Access Research, Canberra, Australian National University, 2013.,
- "The Sino-Korean Poetic Tradition of the Late 16th Century". East Asian History (Papers on Far Eastern History), The Australian National University's Department of Far Eastern History, March 1986, Vol. 33, pp. 139–157.
- "The Poetic thought of Hŏ Nansŏrhŏn: the renowned Sino-Korean Poetess". East Asian History (Papers on Far Eastern History), The Australian National University's Department of Far Eastern History, 1987, Vol.36, pp. 93–108.
- "The Impact of Taoism on the Literature of Mid-Chosŏn, 1568–1724" Korean Studies: New Pacific Currents, Honolulu, Center for Korean Studies, University of Hawaii, 1994, pp. 113–124. ISBN 0-8248-1598-X.
- "최양희:한중록의 영역에 부쳐", 한국문학의 외국어 번역:현황과 전망, Seoul, 민음사, 1997, pp. 27–43. ISBN 89-374-1122-9.
- "나의 아버지 최재서 (Jaisou Choe)". 대산문화, Seoul, The Daesan Foundation, 2014, Vol. 51, pp. 138–142. ISSN 1599-9882.
- MA thesis: Hanjung-nok: Memoirs of a Yi Dynasty Court Lady, Canberra, The Australian National University, 1974. Choe-Wall, Yang Hi– Open Access Theses and Dissertations, Center for Research Libraries (www.crl.edu).
- Ph D thesis: Hŏ Nansŏrhŏn (Heo Nanseolheon) and Her Hanshi – A study of the life and work of Hŏ Nansŏrhŏn – a late sixteenth-century Korean poet, Canberra, The Australian National University, 1984. Choe-Wall, Yang Hi– Open Access Theses and Dissertations, Center for Research Libraries.(http://bibpurl.oclc.org/web/34429&nbsp%5B%5D;)
- Arirang (TV network) – interview with Choe-Wall, Yang Hi / Stephen Epstein (2007).
