= Warwick McKibbin =

Australian academic

Warwick James McKibbin AO (born 21 April 1957 in Sydney) is an Australian emeritus professor of Economics and Public Policy at the Australian National University and a nonresident senior fellow at the Peterson Institute for International Economics who works across a wide range of areas in applied policy. He has published more than 200 scholarly articles and several books and is internationally known for his contribution to global economic modelling.

== Education ==
McKibbin initially studied at the University of New South Wales, where he received a bachelor's degree with First Class Honours in both economics and econometrics and was awarded the University Medal in 1980. McKibbin then studied under Jeffrey Sachs at Harvard University and was awarded a PhD in economics in 1986.

== Roles ==
McKibbin was founding director of the ANU Research School of Economics until stepping down in mid-2012. He moved to the Crawford School of Public Policy at ANU in August 2012. He is also an adjunct professor of the Australian Centre for Economic Research on Health. He formed the ANU Centre for Applied Macroeconomic Analysis (CAMA) in 2003 and was the inaugural director of CAMA.

He is a nonresident senior fellow at the Peterson Institute for International Economics in Washington, DC. He was the professorial fellow of the Lowy Institute for International Policy in Sydney, and a non-resident senior fellow at The Brookings Institution in Washington, DC, where he co-directed the climate change program.

McKibbin is the CEO and founder of McKibbin Software Group Pty Ltd.

He was a former member of the board of the Reserve Bank of Australia after being appointed by the Howard Government in July 2001 until the end of his term at the end of July 2011. McKibbin was also a member of the Australian Prime Minister's Science Engineering and Innovation Council under the Howard Government (2005–2007).

He was made a Fellow of the Australian Academy of Social Sciences at the age of 40, and in 2001 was awarded the Centenary Medal "For service to Australian society through economic policy and tertiary education".

== Collaborations ==
The McKibbin-Sachs Global Model is a global economic model developed originally in 1984 jointly with Jeffrey Sachs and is a widely used intertemporal general equilibrium model of the world economy.

The G-Cubed Model is a global economic model developed in 1991 jointly with Peter Wilcoxen and is a widely used multi-sector intertemporal general equilibrium model of the world economy.

The Henderson McKibbin Taylor Rule for Monetary Policy was first proposed by Dale W. Henderson and Warwick McKibbin in 1993 and simultaneously by John B. Taylor.

The McKibbin-Wilcoxen Blueprint is also known as the McKibbin Wilcoxen Hybrid. McKibbin (Australian National University) and Peter Wilcoxen (Syracuse University) outline various approaches to climate change policy. They argue that the issue of taking action against climate change should be separated from the issue of whether Australia should ratify the Kyoto Protocol. Once the Kyoto Protocol is set aside it is clear that there are better options available. They argue that Kyoto Protocol-based carbon-trading systems are too inflexible/brittle to attract developing countries (particularly China and India). A better system would need to be flexible enough to refine outcomes over time (as new data become available).

== Honours and awards ==
McKibbin was awarded the Order of Australia in 2016 "For Distinguished Service to Education as an Economist, Particularly in the Area of Global Climate Policy, and to Financial Institutions and International Organisations" ref>Australia Day Honours List</ref> and the Centenary medal in 2001 "For Service to Australian Society through Economic Policy and Tertiary Education".
