= Teretia Tokam =

I-Kiribati activist

Teretia Tokam is a women's and children's rights activist in Kiribati. She is the founding coordinator of the Kiribati Women and Children Support Centre.

== Biography ==
Teretia Tokam graduated with a bachelor of laws from the University of the South Pacific. She then worked as a lawyer at the attorney general's office in Tarawa. While working on domestic violence cases as an attorney, she saw the need for more proactive efforts to combat gender-based violence.

Since then, Tokam has led efforts to end violence against women and children in Kiribati. This has included working to develop the Te Rau N Te Mwenga (Family Peace) Act of 2014 and pushing for better responses to gender-based violence from front-line service providers. She also was involved in the creation of the country's first Ministry of Women and served as the national coordinator on ending sexual and gender-based violence at the Ministry of Internal and Social Affairs. With two others, she co-founded the Kiribati Women Activist Network.

In 2015, Tokam won a scholarship to the Australian National University, where over the course of two years she obtained a master's in applied anthropology and participatory development.

Since 2017, she has served as the founding leader of the Tarawa-based Kiribati Women and Children Support Centre, a community-based organization supporting those facing domestic violence. While there, she helped open a second branch of the center on Kiritimati in 2021.

In 2022, Tokam was appointed to the Pacific Women Lead Governance Board.
