= Peru–Thailand relations =

- Peru: Thailand

Diplomatic mission
- Embassy of Peru, Bangkok: Thai Embassy, Lima

Peru–Thailand relations are the bilateral relations between the Republic of Peru and the Kingdom of Thailand were established in 1965. Both countries are members of the Non-Aligned Movement, World Trade Organization, Asia-Pacific Economic Cooperation and the United Nations.

== History ==
Peru and Thailand formally established their relations at embassy level on September 14, 1965. A Peruvian embassy opened in 1992. The Thai embassy is also accredited to Bolivia, Colombia, Ecuador, and Venezuela. In 2011, a parliamentary league of Peru-Thai friendship was inaugurated.

The 55th anniversary of the establishment of relations was celebrated in 2020.

== High-level visits ==
High-level visits from Peru to Thailand

- President Alberto Fujimori (1991 & 1996)
- President Alejandro Toledo and First Lady Eliane Karp (2003).
- First Lady Eliane Karp (2006)
- Deputy Foreign Minister Armando Raúl Patiño Alvístur (2016)
- Deputy Foreign Minister Jaime Antonio Pomareda Montenegro (2019)

High-level visits from Thailand to Peru

- Prince Vajiralongkorn (1993)
- Vice Prime Minister Amnuay Veerawan (1996)
- Prime Minister Chuan Leekpai (1999)
- Princess Chulabhorn (2000)
- Prime Minister Somchai Wongsawat (2008)
- Deputy Prime Minister Prajin Juntong (2016)
- Deputy Foreign Minister Weerasak Futrakul (2016 & 2018)

== Trade ==
Peru is Thailand's fifth trading partner in Latin America and the Caribbean. In 2021, Peruvian exports to Thailand reached US$ 124 million.

Peru and Thailand signed a free trade agreement that came into force in 2011.

== Resident diplomatic missions ==
- Peru has an embassy in Bangkok.
- Thailand has an embassy in Lima.

== See also ==
- Foreign relations of Thailand
- Foreign relations of Peru
- List of ambassadors of Peru to Thailand
- List of ambassadors of Thailand to Peru
