= List of ambassadors of Indonesia to Peru =

Ambassador of Indonesia to Peru Accredited to Bolivia
- Duta Besar Indonesia untuk Peru
- Emblem of the Ministry of Foreign Affairs

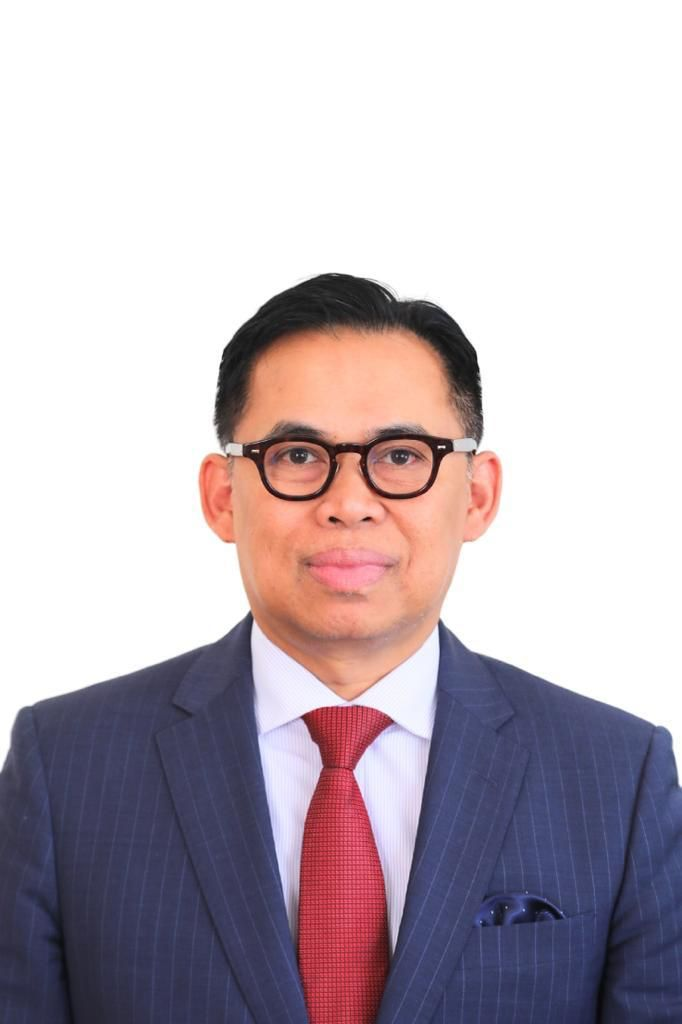
- Incumbent; Ricky Suhendar since 2023
- Ministry of Foreign Affairs; Embassy of Indonesia, London
- Seat: Lima, Peru
- Appointer: President of Indonesia
- Website: kemlu.go.id/lima

The ambassador of Indonesia to Peru is the highest representative of the Republic of Indonesia to the Republic of Peru. The ambassador, resident in Lima, is also accredited to the Plurinational State of Bolivia.

Both countries established diplomatic relations in 1975. Peru opened its embassy in 1992 and Indonesia opened its embassy in 2002.

As of 2025, diplomat Ricky Suhendar is the ambassador to Peru and Bolivia.

== List of representatives ==
Name	Appointed	Presentation of credentials	Term end	President	Notes
Gusti Ngurah Swetga				Megawati Sukarnoputri	
I Gusti Ngurah Suwetja			July 31, 2005	Susilo Bambang Yudhoyono	Also accredited to Bolivia and Ecuador.
I Gde I Gde Djelantik		November 11, 2005		Susilo Bambang Yudhoyono	Also accredited to Bolivia and Ecuador.
Yosef Berty Fernandez	January 20, 2010			Susilo Bambang Yudhoyono	Also accredited to Bolivia.
Moenir Ari Soenanda	February 14, 2014	May 16, 2014	2017	Susilo Bambang Yudhoyono	Also accredited to Bolivia, where he presented his credentials on October 13, 2014.
Marina Estella Anwar Bey	February 20, 2018	July 18, 2018	January 2023	Joko Widodo	Also accredited to Bolivia, where he presented his credentials on December 26, 2018.
Ricky Suhendar	June 23, 2023		Incumbent	Joko Widodo	Also accredited to Bolivia.

== See also ==
- List of ambassadors of Peru to Indonesia
