= List of ambassadors of Thailand to Brazil =

Coordinates: 15.785775°S 47.865302°W

Ambassador of Thailand to Brazil
- Inaugural holder: Thepkamol Devakula
- Formation: 1963

The Thai Ambassador in Brasília is the official representative of the Government in Bangkok to the Government of Brazil.

== History ==
- From 1969 to December 1, 2006 the Thai Ambassador to Brasilia was concurrently accredited in Lima.

== List of representatives ==
Diplomatic agreement/designated/diplomatic accreditation	Ambassador	Thai language	Observations	List of prime ministers of Thailand	President of Brazil	Term end
1963	Thepkamol Devakula	หม่อมราชวงศ์เทพกมล เทวกุล	Mom Rajawongse Thuaithep Devakul: In 1962 he was Thai Ambassador to Egypt, Thai Ambassador to United Arab Republic Left Cairo Mom Rajawongse Thuaithep Devakul, the Thai Ambassador to the United Arab Republic and concurrently Ambassador to Lebanon, who has been appointed Thai Ambassador to Brazil, left, presented his letters of accreditation, has been appointed new Thai Ambassador to Italy. New Thai Ambassador to Brazil	Thanom Kittikachorn	João Goulart	1966
1969	Charas Chaloemtiarana	จรัส เฉลิมเตียรณ		Thanom Kittikachorn	Emílio Garrastazu Médici	1970
1970	Manu Amatayakul	มนู อมาตยกุล		Thanom Kittikachorn	Emílio Garrastazu Médici	1971
1971	Vidhura Vathanaprida	วิฑูร วัฒนปรีดา	Witun Watanapruda	Thanom Kittikachorn	Emílio Garrastazu Médici	1972
May 21, 1973	Arsh Boongrapu	อัจฉ บุญกระพือ	Ath Bunkrapeu (* 6 November 1922 - 2006) Colonel, accredited November 21, 1973 was married to Natchari Thananan, was Thai Ambassador to Italy.	Sanya Dharmasakti	Emílio Garrastazu Médici	August 3, 1976
September 28, 1977	Chamnong Phahularat	จํานง พาหุลรัตน		Kriangsak Chomanan	Ernesto Geisel	1980
March 24, 1981	Prasong Suwanpradhes	ประสงค สุวรรณประเทศ		Prem Tinsulanonda	João Baptista de Oliveira Figueiredo	1982
October 9, 1982	Tongchan Jotikasthira	ธงฉาน โชติกเสถียร		Prem Tinsulanonda	João Baptista de Oliveira Figueiredo	1984
1984	Pranom Kongsamut	ประนอม กองสมุทร		Prem Tinsulanonda	João Baptista de Oliveira Figueiredo	1986
June 30, 1987	Pradeep Sochiratna	ประทีป โศจิรัตน		Prem Tinsulanonda	Sarney	1991
September 10, 1991	Anurak Thananan	อนุรักษ ธนานันท	concurrente en accredited in Venezuela, 1995-1997 he was Thai Ambassador to Italy, Tailandia S.E. el senor Anurak Thananan Embajador Extraordinaori y Plenipotencirio Sep. 10 de 1991 No residente	Anand Panyarachun	Fernando Collor de Mello	1995
1995	Saksit Srisorn	ศักดิ์สิทธ ศรีสอน		Banharn Silpa-Archa	Fernando Henrique Cardoso	1998
1998	Samroeng Laksanasut	สําเริง ลักษณะสุต		Chuan Leekpai	Fernando Henrique Cardoso	2001
2001	Suphat Chitranukoh	สุพัฒน จิตรานุเคราะห	September 1, 2010 he was Thai Ambassador to BahrainFebruary 21, 2005 he was Thai Ambassador to Bangladesh	Thaksin Shinawatra	Fernando Henrique Cardoso	2005
2005	Siree Bunnag	สิรี บุนนาค	Miss Siree Bunnagนาง สาวสิรี บุนนาค	Thaksin Shinawatra	Luiz Inácio Lula da Silva	2007
November 13, 2009	Chakarin Chayabongse	จักริน ฉายะวงศ์	นายจักริน ฉายะวงศ์	Samak Sundaravej	Luiz Inácio Lula da Silva	2012
2011	Tharit Charungvat	ธฤต จรุงวัฒน์	*In 2014 he was Thai Ambassador to Turkey	Yingluck Shinawatra	Dilma Rousseff	2013
2014	Pitchayaphant Charnbhumidol	พิชยพันธุ์ ชาญภูมิดล	Ambassador-designate Ambassador of Thailand to Indonesia, The Kampuchean Conflict, 1975-1985: A Case Study of Threat Perception and International Conflict by Pitchayaphant Charnbhumidol	Prayut Chan-o-cha	Dilma Rousseff	2017
May 18, 2017	Kosin Phonmang	โกสินทร์ ผลมั่ง	Charge d Affairs	Prayut Chan-o-cha	Michel Temer	August 28, 2017
August 28, 2017	Surasak Suparat	สุรศักดิ์ สุภารัตน์	he was Minister in Pretoria	Prayut Chan-o-cha	Michel Temer	August 24, 2023
