= International reactions to the assassination of Benazir Bhutto =

International reactions to the assassination of Benazir Bhutto consisted of universal condemnation across the international community, including Pakistan's regional neighbors Afghanistan, China, India, Bangladesh, and Iran. Indian Prime Minister Manmohan Singh praised Bhutto's efforts for the improvement of India-Pakistan relations. The UN Security Council held an emergency meeting and unanimously condemned the assassination, a call echoed by UN Secretary-General Ban Ki-moon. Both European Union President José Manuel Barroso and U.S. President George W. Bush also expressed the hope that Pakistan will continue on the path of democracy.

== Africa ==
- Algeria – The Foreign Ministry issued a statement, saying that "Algeria is keen to condemn with the greatest firmness this criminal act, which came to shatter the fate of an exceptional personality, fully involved in the democratic fight for the renewal of her country."
- Egypt – Foreign Minister Ahmed Aboul Gheit "conveyed deep condolences to the bereaved family of Benazir Bhutto, her party workers, government and people of Pakistan.."
- Liberia – President Ellen Johnson Sirleaf released a statement, saying that she was "deeply disturbed and saddened by the events in Pakistan."
- Libya – The Foreign Ministry released a statement condemning the "odious terrorist operation" and affirming its "staunch opposition to all that is likely to jeopardize security and peace in Pakistani society".
- Morocco – King Mohammed VI condemned the assassination in a message to Musharraf, describing Bhutto as "one of illustrious leaders [of Pakistan] both in the Government and in the opposition."
- Namibia – A Foreign Affairs Ministry statement called on the Pakistani authorities to "ensure that those who have carried this pre-meditated and cowardly killing are brought to justice." It also offered condolences to the families of Bhutto and those who were killed in the blast.
- Nigeria – President Umaru Yar'Adua urged Bhutto's family, the Pakistani government and her supporters "to take solace in the knowledge that she died in active pursuit of her vision of true democracy for her country, and that in death, she has become an eternal martyr to the cause she believed in with all her heart."
- South Africa – Foreign Affairs spokesman Ronnie Mamoepa said, "Clearly South Africa is saddened by the news of the murder of Benazir Bhutto and condemns unequivocally this outrageous act of violence...We call on the Pakistani people do everything in their power, to leave no stone unturned to find the perpetrators of this dastardly act."
- Tunisia – The Foreign Affairs Ministry released a statement that strongly denounced the assassination, expressing "regret over the Pakistani official's slaying."
- Uganda – Foreign Affairs Minister Isaac Musumba said, "It is very deplorable and very pathetic. We thought that democracy was finally having its day in Pakistan. The murder of Bhutto and other people shows that terrorism must continue to be fought relentlessly and without compromise."

== Asia ==
- Afghanistan – President Hamid Karzai condemned "the act of cowardice and immense brutality in the strongest possible terms." He praised Bhutto for "having sacrificed her life for the sake of Pakistan and for the sake of this region."
- Azerbaijan – President Ilham Aliyev said, "This tragic event confirms once again the need for mobilization of all forces in order to fight terrorism and for joint efforts against this calamity, which is a source of constant threat to humankind" and expressed his "deepest condolences to the people of Pakistan, as well as to the families of those killed."
- Bahrain – The government denounced the assassination, saying that "[it] extends its sincere condolences to Bhutto's family and all the Pakistani people" and calling for "self-restraint."
- Bangladesh – Chief Advisor Fakhruddin Ahmed condemned the attack, stating that "it was an unpardonable crime that has shocked the world. The government and people of Bangladesh mourned this tragedy with their Pakistani brethren." Major political parties also condemned the assassination. The Awami League urged "pro-democratic and progressive forces to stand united against this heinous killing", while the Bangladesh Nationalist Party feared the assassination may leave "an adverse impact on the democratic politics of the subcontinent". The Jatiya Party, Workers Party of Bangladesh, National Awami Party and Bikalpa Dhara Bangladesh also issued statements of strong condemnation.
- Brunei - Sultan Hassanal Bolkiah "expressed shock" and condemned Bhutto's assassination. He also conveyed his deepest condolences and profound respects to the people of Pakistan and to the family and friends of the late Benazir Bhutto.
- Cambodia - Prime Minister Hun Sen condemned the assassination, calling it "coward terrorism", and said that her killing was "a serious problem in Pakistan". He also expressed his condolences to Bhutto's family and called for all political parties in Pakistan to solve matters patiently.
- China – Foreign Ministry spokesperson Qin Gang said that China was "shocked at the killing of Pakistan's opposition leader Benazir Bhutto" and "strongly condemns the terrorist attack."
- India – Prime Minister Manmohan Singh said he was "deeply shocked and horrified to hear of the heinous assassination of Mrs. Benazir Bhutto. Mrs. Bhutto was no ordinary political leader, but one who left a deep imprint on her time and age. Her contributions to a previous moment of hope in India–Pakistan relations, and her intent to break India Pakistan relations out of the sterile patterns of the past, were exemplary. In her death, the sub-continent has lost an outstanding leader who worked for democracy and reconciliation in her country. The manner of her going is a reminder of the common dangers that our region faces from cowardly acts of terrorism and of the need to eradicate this dangerous threat. My heartfelt condolences go to her family and the people of Pakistan who have suffered a grievous blow." Foreign Minister Pranab Mukherjee said he "heard with shock and horror of the death of Mrs. Benazir Bhutto," whose "contributions to democracy, to the improvement of India–Pakistan relations, and to the restoration of normalcy within Pakistan will be an inspiration. Mrs. Bhutto was a brave and outstanding woman leader of the sub-continent. That she should fall to a barbarous terrorist attack is particularly tragic, and should strengthen our resolve to fight this scourge."
- Indonesia – President Susilo Bambang Yudhoyono said, "...he was shocked and condemned the terrorists". He expressed a hope that such a fatal accident will not harm democracy in Pakistan, which is now unstable especially towards its general elections which will be held on 15 January 2008. He also said that "the incident had dealt a serious blow to the transition of democracy."
- Iran – Foreign Minister, Manouchehr Mottaki expressed the deep sympathy of the Iranian nation and government and said he hoped that the Pakistani government would try and track down the culprits behind this crime against Bhutto and a number of innocent people who were present at the scene when a gunman fatally shot her and set off a bomb. A Foreign Affairs Ministry spokesman Mohammad Ali Hosseini said that "we hope the Pakistani government will identify and bring to justice those behind such a criminal act and restore tranquility to the country," and that "the Pakistan government should use all efforts to identify the terrorist group which caused this incident and punish them to prevent terrorist groups from finding opportunities to undertake such actions again."
- Iraq – President Jalal Talabani called on the world to unite against the "cancer of terrorism".
- Israel – President Shimon Peres praised Bhutto, saying "[she] was a brave woman who did not conceal her opinions, knew no fear, and served her nation with unusual bravery and ability. She was an immeasurably charismatic leader and a warrior for peace in her land and all the world." President Peres hailed Bhutto as a "courageous woman" and said he was "shocked" by the news of her assassination. Deputy and Foreign Affairs Minister Tzipi Livni issued the following statement: "We convey our condolences to the people of Pakistan and to the families of the victims. Benazir Bhutto was a well-known leader in Pakistan and in the international community who demonstrated brave leadership for her people. Israel expresses the hope that Pakistan will continue along the path of reconciliation, moderation and democracy." Ambassador to the United Nations Dan Gillerman said that in the weeks prior to her assassination, Bhutto had expressed fear of being killed by extremist elements in Pakistan in emails she sent to him.
- Japan – Foreign Affairs Minister Masahiko Kōmura condemned the attack, saying that "it is absolutely unacceptable to try to solve something by the means of violence."
- Jordan – King Abdullah II, in a message to Musharraf, condemned the assassination and expressed Jordan's "support to Pakistan" to overcome the consequences of this incident.
- Kuwait – Cabinet Affairs Minister Faisal Mohammad Al-Hajji said, "The State of Kuwait strongly condemns the vicious terrorist act which targeted the convoy of Mrs. Benazir Bhutto", and also said that Kuwait expresses sympathies for families of Bhutto and all those who were killed.
- Lebanon – Prime Minister Fouad Siniora said that "Lebanon was shocked by the news of the assassination of former Prime Minister and leader of the Pakistan People's Party Ms. Benazir Bhutto", adding that "on behalf of the Lebanese people we denounce, condemn and deplore the assassination."
- Malaysia – Prime Minister Abdullah Ahmad Badawi extended his deepest condolences to the families of Bhutto and the others who were killed. He also said, "The resort to extremism and violence is unacceptable and cannot be tolerated anywhere at any time. The perpetrators must be brought to justice." He added, "I hope the people in Pakistan will remain calm and I pray that the situation in Pakistan will soon stabilise." Former Prime Minister Mahathir Mohamad said he was saddened by the death of Benazir Bhutto and hoped that peace will once again reign in Pakistan.
- Maldives - President Maumoon Abdul Gayoom condemned the attack and extended his condolences to the Pakistani Government, citizens and the families of Bhutto and the others who were killed. He said, " The government and people of the Maldives join me in extending our heartfelt sympathy to you, and your Government and to the brotherly people of Pakistan, at this time of distress and sorrow. Mrs. Bhutto had served Pakistan for many years, and during her years as Prime Minister, played an important role in regional and world affairs. She was also a very good friend of the Maldives."
- Nepal – Prime Minister Girija Prasad Koirala said he was "shocked to hear the murder of Bhutto."
- Philippines – President Gloria Macapagal Arroyo condemned the assassination, saying "We mourn with the nation of Pakistan over the deaths of Benazir Bhutto and others killed in the shooting and bomb attack in Rawalpindi. We strongly condemn this unmitigated, senseless atrocity, even as we convey our sympathies to the followers of former Prime Minister Bhutto and the families of those who perished. Whoever perpetrated it, this attack is an assault on democracy. The Philippines joins hands with the entire civilized world in solidarity against such mindless barbarity and in unwavering defense of peace, freedom, law and order." Arroyo called on the international community to join hands in preserving peace and order and democracy.
- Saudi Arabia – King Abdullah stated that the assassins were "wicked murderers who are distant from Islam and morals."
- Singapore – The Foreign Affairs Ministry released a statement saying that Singapore "is shocked and horrified at the suicide bomb attack" and strongly condemns the murders. The heads of state and government also sent condolence letters to Bhutto's family.
- South Korea – A Foreign Ministry statement said: "The (South Korean) government cannot hide its bitter shock over the death of former Pakistani Prime Minister Benazir Bhutto, who was killed by terrorists on Thursday while on an election campaign, and it offers its sincerest condolences to the family of the deceased. Our government condemns any type of terrorist acts."
- Sri Lanka – A Foreign Affairs Ministry statement described Bhutto as a South Asian leader who "successfully stood up for democracy", adding that "this brutal assassination underlines the need for the absolute commitment to fight against terrorism in all its forms and manifestations, in order to make it unacceptable in civilized society."
- Syria – A Government spokesman said, "The Syrian government and people...express sincere condolences to the family of Ms. Bhutto, the Pakistan People's Party and the Pakistani government and the confidence that Pakistan will be able to overcome the difficult conditions."
- Thailand – Prime Minister Surayud Chulanont condemned the assassination of Pakistani opposition leader Benazir Bhutto, branding the act as deplorable. A statement issued by Foreign Ministry Spokesman Tharit Charungvat said, "Thailand was deeply shocked and saddened by the deplorable act which led to the deaths of Mrs Benazir Bhutto and several other innocent bystanders. Thailand condemns all forms of terrorist and extremist acts and calls on all parties to react with restraint and work together for the stability of Pakistan."
- Turkey – Prime Minister Recep Tayyip Erdoğan expressed his sorrow over Bhutto's demise during a phone conversation with Musharraf. Erdoğan, who strongly condemned the terrorist attack, also said that he hoped such attack would not hamper the democratization process in Pakistan. President Abdullah Gül, who met Bhutto during a visit to Pakistan earlier that month, called on the international community to assist Pakistan in this "critical" time as it prepares for parliamentary elections. Gül said: "They should own up to their country and make sure there is no more bloodshed".
- United Arab Emirates – Foreign Affairs Minister Abdallah Bin Zayid Al Nahyan stated: "The UAE has been tormented by this huge loss which did not hit Pakistan only, but also affected the UAE."
- Vietnam - The Foreign Affairs Ministry released a statement saying that Vietnam "strongly condemns the brutal terrorist attack" and "hope that...the instigators will be severely punished".
- Yemen – A Government official called the assassination a "sinful attack" and "strongly condemned this distressing terrorist act, which was intended to destabilize the security of Pakistan and its national unity."

== Europe ==
- Albania – The Foreign Ministry said, "Albania expresses its deepest regret and shock at the tragic event in Pakistan, and strongly condemns this hideous terrorist act".
- Austria – Foreign Minister Ursula Plassnik was "shocked and disgusted" by the murder of Benazir Bhutto. Adding that Pakistan "lost a courageous fighter for the country's return to a pluralist democracy."
- Belgium – Prime Minister Guy Verhofstadt said, "This is not only an attack on the life of a former prime minister and present opposition leader. This is yet another attack on the democratic process in Pakistan." Foreign Minister Karel De Gucht issued a similar condemnation, saying that, "extreme forces are strengthening their actions to destabilize the country and put it into chaos."
- Belarus - President Alexander Lukashenko expressed his condolences to the people of Pakistan, President Musharraf, and to the families of those who were killed. President Lukashenko described the incident as a terrorist attack that took the life of the "well-known policy maker" Benazir Bhutto.
- Bulgaria – A Foreign Ministry statement has strongly condemned the terrorist act and said "Bulgaria extended its deepest condolences to Bhutto's family."
- Croatia – President Stjepan Mesic has condemned the killing of Pakistan opposition leader Benazir Bhutto, stating, "terrorism is one of the greatest evils the modern world is faced with and which should be battled with joint efforts".
- Czech Republic – Prime Minister Mirek Topolánek sharply denounced the attack, saying he "hopes the crime will not trigger an avalanche of further violent acts." President Václav Klaus said the hatred behind the attack is a "threat to civilization".
- Denmark – Foreign Minister Per Stig Møller said: "It is terrible and a tragedy for Pakistani society, because there was a real hope of reforms and democratization conjoined with her return to Pakistan and with the election on January 8. It is also an attack against that process, as the people who did this do not want reforms and democracy."
- Finland – Prime Minister Matti Vanhanen said, "Benazir Bhutto made a brave return to her homeland to take part in free elections and to promote democracy. Her tragic death is a setback to democracy and speaks in a shocking way about the internal confrontations of Pakistan."
- France – President Nicolas Sarkozy "condemned the odious act with the greatest severity," stating that "terrorism and violence have no place in the democratic debate and in the combat of ideas and programmes. More than ever it is necessary for the [Pakistani] legislative elections to take place in conditions of pluralism, transparency and security." Foreign Affairs Minister Bernard Kouchner referred to the assassination as an "odious act" that "reaffirms France's commitment to the stability of Pakistan and its democracy."
- Germany – Chancellor Angela Merkel stated that the "cowardly act underscored the need to continue the fight against terrorism and support those who suffer its consequences." Foreign Minister Frank-Walter Steinmeier commented that Bhutto's death was a "severe blow to everyone in Pakistan who is fighting for democracy".
- Greece – Foreign Minister Dora Bakoyannis said, "Greece condemns the terrorist attack in the most categorical way that, just two weeks ahead of the Parliamentary elections in Pakistan, has led to this tragic loss." She called Bhutto "a leading international personality who struggled steadfastly for democracy, peace, respect for human dignity and reconciliation in her country," and stated that "we are watching the events with great concern, at the same time expressing the wish and the hope that this country will follow the path towards the construction of a democratic regime. This will also constitute the sole vindication of the tragic sacrifice of Benazir Bhutto."
- Holy See – Secretary of State Tarcisio Bertone expressed the sadness of Pope Benedict XVI, saying that "the Holy Father expresses sentiments of deep sympathy and spiritual closeness to the members of her family and to the entire Pakistani nation. He prays that further violence will be avoided and that every effort will be made to build a climate of respect and trust, which are so necessary if good order is to be maintained in society and if the country's political institutions are to operate effectively." Spokesman Federico Lombardi said that "this attack shows how extremely difficult it is to pacify a nation so wrought by violence." He also said that the Vatican "share[s] the sadness of the Pakistani population."
- Hungary – Foreign Affairs Ministry spokesman Lajos Szelestey said, "Hungary strongly condemns all forms of terrorism". He called the attack which resulted in the murder of Bhutto and dozens of others "an unjustifiable crime, which will seriously hamper the democratization process of Pakistan and will render the elections in January more difficult".
- Iceland – President Ólafur Ragnar Grímsson said Bhutto was "an admired leader that warned against terrorism and extremists' views, highly educated and broadminded, full of energy."
- Ireland – Describing herself as "shocked and saddened," President Mary McAleese said, "On my own behalf and on behalf of the people of Ireland, I send my deepest condolences to her family and to the people of Pakistan and especially to those members of the Pakistan community here in Ireland." Prime Minister Bertie Ahern said, "Ms Bhutto and her party have been campaigning heavily in the run-up to the parliamentary elections due to be held in less than two weeks, an election which will provide all of the people of Pakistan with an opportunity to secure democracy for their country. It is my sincere hope that this appalling attack will not prevent the Pakistani people from achieving that objective." Foreign Affairs Minister Dermot Ahern said he was "...deeply shocked by the assassination". He also called upon the Pakistani authorities to do their utmost to ensure that Pakistan continues on its path back to democracy
- Italy – Prime Minister Romano Prodi said, in a statement, "I express my sadness and that of the whole government following the death of Benazir Bhutto, a woman who wanted to fight her battle until the end with just one weapon—that of dialogue and political discussion. I condemn with great indignation the blind rage of terror which has again seen blood spilled and brought pain to Pakistan, a country already too often martyred by fanaticism. The difficult path towards peace and democracy in this region should not be abandoned and the sacrifice of the former prime minister… should be the strongest example for those who do not give up in the face of terrorism." Foreign Affairs Minister Massimo D'Alema said, "I absolutely condemn this barbaric act of violence which, in striking at Pakistan just days before elections, places serious question marks against the complex and difficult path towards democracy."
- Luxembourg – Prime Minister Jean-Claude Juncker described the assassination as a "deeply contemptible act."
- Malta – Foreign Minister Michael Frendo said, "The killing of Benazir Bhutto is an attack on democracy and on secular politics in Pakistan. We express our solidarity with the people of Pakistan at this moment of loss."
- Netherlands – Foreign Affairs Minister Maxime Verhagen expressed his disgust over of the bombing. On behalf of the Dutch Cabinet he stated the bomb attack is a huge blow for the restoration of democracy in Pakistan.
- Norway – Prime Minister Jens Stoltenberg said, "It is with sadness that we have received the news of the murder of the former Prime Minister. We condemn the attack as a serious atrocity against the process of reestablishing democracy in Pakistan. Bhutto was a controversial, but a brave to reestablish the democracy in Pakistan, and she was in the middle of the process when she was killed. Her death is a terrible blow on this process." He also said it was important that "the despicable act would not halt the reforms in Pakistan."
- Poland – Foreign Minister Radosław Sikorski condemned the assassination and added that he hopes that killing will not affect next year's elections.
- Portugal – President Aníbal Cavaco Silva condemned the "tragic attacks" that killed the former Pakistani prime minister Benazir Bhutto, describing the killing as a "heinous act". He also expressed "deep sorrow and solidarity" to the president and people of Pakistan.
- Romania - The Ministry of Foreign Affairs condemned the assassination, describing it as "an attack on the democratic process" and expressing solidarity with the Pakistani people in the face of such "reprehensible acts". In the press statement, the Ministry also "expressed confidence in Pakistani society's ability to defend the rule of law and fight terrorism in all its forms".
- Russia – The Foreign Affairs Ministry "firmly condemned" the attack, "expressed [their] condolences to Benazir Bhutto's relatives and loved ones" and "hoped that the Pakistani leadership will manage to take necessary steps to ensure stability in the country." In a statement addressed to Pervez Musharraf, President Vladimir Putin expressed his condolences to friends and relatives of the victims as well as hope that the perpetrators will be found and punished.
- Spain – Prime Minister José Luis Rodríguez Zapatero said: "I want to express the most firm condemnation at the savage terrorist attack carried out in Rawalpindi."
- Sweden – Foreign Minister Carl Bildt said in a press conference about an hour after the murder that he felt both disgusted and angry for what had happened, and also worried over the further consequences.
- Switzerland – The Federal Department of Foreign Affairs released a statement strongly condemning the attack. It called on Pakistani authorities and all concerned actors to maintain the country's stability and to continue pursuing the democratic process.
- Ukraine – Speaker of Parliament Arseniy Yatsenyuk, after the parliament had held a minute's silence, stated that Parliament "wished to extend its condolences to the family of the deceased (Bhutto), and to the Pakistani people for their loss." Ukraine's Foreign Ministry called for an objective and detailed investigation of the assassination of Pakistan's opposition leader Benazir Bhutto.
- United Kingdom – Prime Minister Gordon Brown stated, "Benazir Bhutto may have been killed by terrorists but the terrorists must not be allowed to kill democracy in Pakistan and this atrocity strengthens our resolve that terrorists will not win there, here or anywhere in the world." Brown further stated those responsible were "cowards, afraid of democracy" and that the British government would "work with all in the Pakistani community in Britain and elsewhere in the world, so that we can have a peaceful, and safe, and democratic Pakistan." Foreign Secretary David Miliband released a statement saying, "In targeting Benazir Bhutto, extremist groups have in their sights all those committed to democratic processes in Pakistan. They cannot and must not succeed. This is a time for restraint but also unity," also stating that he was "deeply shocked." Justice Secretary Jack Straw added in his statement, "The sense of grief at her senseless killing will I know be shared not just by Pakistani communities across the world but by everyone, because this terrorism is an attack on us all, regardless of race, religion or party. We will ensure that it is defeated."

== North America ==
- Bahamas – Prime Minister Hubert Ingraham said, "Her assassination has left much of the world in a state of shock and grave concern for the future of Pakistan, the region and the world."
- Canada – Foreign Affairs Minister Maxime Bernier issued the statement: "Canada condemns in the strongest terms this attack on the restoration of Pakistan's efforts to return to full democracy. Today's violence is especially heinous in view of the upcoming elections on January 8, 2008. The anti-democratic intent of the perpetrators could not be more obvious. I urge the Government and people of Pakistan to continue to reject all forms of violence and to resist those who seek to destabilize their country. Stability in Pakistan is vital for regional stability and security. We extend our deepest condolences to the family of Benazir Bhutto, to the families of the other victims of today's attack, and to the Pakistani people. Our thoughts are with them at this difficult time." Prime Minister Stephen Harper later added to reporters at a press meeting in Calgary: "We condemn this attack in the strongest possible terms. This was an abhorrent act of terror. We hope that the government of Pakistan will act to bring the perpetrators to justice".
- Jamaica – Prime Minister Bruce Golding expressed shock and outrage at the assassination and expressed the hope that "the Pakistani people will find lasting peace within a framework of democracy, tolerance and mutual respect."
- Mexico – Foreign Affairs Secretary Patricia Espinosa "energetically condemned" the event, reaffirmed Mexico's rejection of "terrorism in all its forms and the loss of innocent people's lives", and expressed their "deepest condolences to Benazir Bhutto's relatives and the families of the 20 other victims, as well as to the people and authorities of Pakistan."
- Trinidad and Tobago – The Foreign Affairs Ministry released a statement, saying that "the Government and people of the Republic of Trinidad and Tobago express the deepest sympathy to the Government and people of the Islamic Republic of Pakistan and family members of former Prime Minister Ms Benazir Ali Bhutto, political leader of the Pakistan People's Party, on the tragic incident which resulted in her untimely demise and that of innocent civilians", adding that "the Government of the Republic of Trinidad and Tobago strongly condemns this act and reaffirms its unwavering commitment to international efforts to eradicate terrorism."
- United States – President George Bush strongly condemned the assassination, urging her killers to be brought to justice. Bush condemned the assassination as a "cowardly act by murderous extremists," and encouraged Pakistan to "honor Benazir Bhutto's memory by continuing with the democratic process for which she so bravely gave her life." Bush also offered some strong praise of Bhutto, noting that "she knew that her return to Pakistan earlier this year put her life at risk. Yet she refused to let assassins to dictate the course of her country." Speaker of the House Nancy Pelosi said, "The brutal assassination of former Pakistani Prime Minister Benazir Bhutto is a tragic setback for the restoration of democracy in Pakistan. Her courageous return to Pakistan this year gave hope to all those concerned by efforts to extinguish rule of law there." Senate Majority Leader Harry Reid said, "It is important, when faced with the violence and loss of innocent life over the last few days, that political leaders show a commitment to resolve but also restraint. Extremists must be brought to justice, but extremism must not undermine commitment to the rule of law, to human rights, and to democracy." At another press briefing at around 13:00 EST on 27 December, a State Department spokesman asserted that "some kind of postponement or delay" in Pakistan's democratic process would be "a victory" for "the extremists" who were responsible for Benazir Bhutto's assassination. He also asserted that "perhaps the best antidote to extremism is the continuation of the democratic process." He called for a "credible and transparent" investigation of the attack, and alluded to the "broad international outrage" about the incident. He also said that Bush spoke with Musharraf at 13:15 EST. Ambassador to the United Nations Zalmay Khalilzad, while describing Bhutto as a "courageous figure", said that "The world has much at stake in the success of Pakistan's democratic institutions. It's a great tragedy because she stood for moderation, for rule of law, for democracy in her country, and her death is a loss for the cause of moderation, democracy, and rule of law for Pakistan. She was clear-headed about the problems of her country, the challenges that she faced — even the security challenges she faced." Secretary of State Condoleezza Rice said in a statement,"We extend our sincere condolences to the Bhutto family and to the families of others who were killed and wounded in the attack. We condemn in the strongest terms possible this cowardly and murderous attack."

== Oceania ==
- Australia – Prime Minister Kevin Rudd urged restraint, saying "Benazir Bhutto showed great courage and defiance in her resistance to extremism. I urge all parties in Pakistan to act with restraint and to work for a return to a peaceful democratic process. It is my hope that a democratic Pakistan will be Benazir Bhutto's legacy."
- Fiji – Finance Minister Mahendra Chaudhry said, "Ms. Bhutto was, in recent times, a beacon of hope for the millions of Pakistani people who aspired for a free, fair and democratic Pakistan. It is a real tragedy that Ms Bhutto has not been allowed to realise her vision for Pakistan and the rest of the world."
- New Zealand – Prime Minister Helen Clark said she was deeply shocked and saddened saying "Benazir Bhutto showed great courage in returning to Pakistan to contest the election. She had survived attempts on her life and was acutely aware of the dangers she faced in returning to campaign for the elections. Her death is a great loss to Pakistan and to the region. My sympathies go out to her immediate family, political colleagues, and to the people of Pakistan for their terrible loss."

== South America ==
- Argentina – President Cristina Fernández de Kirchner condemned "energetically the awful attack that (...) took the life of Benazir Bhutto. The Argentine government wishes to express its deepest condolences to the Bhutto family, as well to the other victims' families and the whole people of Pakistan".
- Bolivia – The Ministry of Foreign Affairs sent a letter to UN asking for an investigation of the assassination. In name of President Evo Morales it expressed Bolivia's condemnation of the attack.
- Brazil – President Luiz Inácio Lula da Silva condemned the attacks and spoke of his "great pain and indignation" at the violence. Later, in a statement, Lula da Silva reaffirmed his "firm rejection to the use of violence in political life" and extended his condolences "to the families of the victims and the Pakistani nation" in the name of the Brazilian Government.
- Chile – President Michelle Bachelet condemned the assassination and paid tribute to Bhutto. The Foreign Affairs Ministry expressed deep consternation at the loss of Bhutto and condemned the events as "terrorist acts." The ministry also expressed its hope that "this event does not dim the opening process towards a total democracy and the national reconciliation."
- Guyana – The Foreign Affairs Ministry sent an official message conveying the condolences of the government and people of Guyana and hoped "peace and stability will prevail."
- Paraguay – The Foreign Affairs Ministry issued a statement expressing its rejection of "acts of violence and the loss of human life", repudiating "acts of terrorism in any of its manifestations", and "[sending] to the Bhutto family, to the families of other victims, as well as to the people and authorities of Pakistan, its sincere condolences."
- Peru – President Alan García stated at the Casa de Pizarro that "Peru reaffirms its absolute opposition to terrorism, which must firmly be fought with total respect to human rights and democratic liberties." Garcia expressed the condolences of the Peruvian people to Bhutto's family and hoped that Pakistan would soon find order. It was also revealed that García was a close friend of Bhutto, according to a Chancellorship note.
- Venezuela – President Hugo Chávez said, "We received the news with great pain, and I hope this is never repeated ever again, anywhere."

== International organisations ==
- Arab League – Secretary General Amr Moussa strongly condemned the assassination, saying: "We condemn this assassination and terrorist act, and pray for God Almighty to bless her soul."
- Commonwealth of Nations – Secretary-General Don McKinnon said "I hope that this terrible tragedy will make crystal clear the folly of violence and the importance of restraint and reconciliation as the only way of consolidating the democratic process. The Commonwealth stands by Pakistan in that effort."
- European Union – European Commission President José Manuel Barroso condemned the assassination as "an attack against democracy and against Pakistan," and "[hopes] that Pakistan will remain firmly on track for return to democratic civilian rule." First Vice President Margot Wallström said, "In a region of such global importance, Benazir's was a rare woman's voice speaking out for democracy and against violence. Much of her life was spent working for these values. I am saddened by this loss and send condolences to her family and to the people of Pakistan. I hope that democracy will prevail there and that the country will remain on track for a return to democratic civilian rule."
- Organisation of the Islamic Conference – Secretary General Ekmeleddin İhsanoğlu "condemned in strongest terms the outrageous and brutal murder of the former Prime Minister of Pakistan and leader of Pakistan People's Party, Ms. Benazir Bhutto in a shocking suicide attack in Rawalpindi."
- United Nations – Secretary-General Ban Ki-moon said: "I strongly condemn this heinous crime and call for the perpetrators to be brought to justice as soon as possible. This represents an assault on stability in Pakistan and its democratic processes." The Security Council held an emergency meeting and unanimously condemned the assassination.
- World Bank Group – President Robert Zoellick said, "This tragedy will only hinder Pakistan's critical agenda of meeting the urgent needs of its many citizens. On behalf of the World Bank Group, I would like to extend my sympathies and deepest condolences to Ms. Bhutto's family and to the families of the other victims of this tragic event."

== Non-governmental organisations ==
- Al-Qaeda – Spokesman Mustafa Abu al-Yazid was quoted by the Philippine media as saying that "we terminated the most precious American [sic] asset who vowed to defeat the mujahideen."
- (Afghanistan) However, a spokesman for Al-Qaeda-linked Tehrik-i-Taliban Pakistan leader Baitullah Mehsud was quoted the following day as saying: "I strongly deny it. Tribal people have their own customs. We don't strike women."
- Amnesty International – Asian Program Director Catherine Baber said: "It is shocking to see someone's life cut short in such a brutal way. Attacks such as these can never be justified. They violate international law and the rules of democratic behavior. We know that the government of President Musharraf will find itself under enormous pressure to go after the culprits and keep the country calm and stable, but Amnesty International calls on President Musharraf – and on the security forces – to exercise restraint and uphold the rule of law. The killing of Benazir Bhutto must not be allowed to become a setback to civilian governance or indeed lead to a further crackdown on civil liberties." AI United States Government Relations Director Alex Arriaga said: "Pakistan is at a dangerous crossroads. If it cannot rely on an independent judiciary, some of the most dangerous aspects of martial law will become enshrined in its legal and political system, leaving the people's human rights in the balance. The United States government must press its ally, which has used the 'War on Terror' to justify its actions, and put an end to this slippery slope. Without these steps, the Bush administration will further acquiesce that fundamental rights can be denied, and those who oppose Musharraf are likely to face intimidation – or even death."
- Human Rights Watch – A statement was calling the assassination a "tragic event with serious implications for Pakistan's transition to democracy" and stating that "political violence of this nature has claimed far too many innocent lives in Pakistan and it must stop. Benazir Bhutto was a democrat who believed in the supremacy of constitutional rule and throughout her career, sought power through the ballot box. Today, she died campaigning for votes and calling for a free election." HRW South Asia researcher, speaking for the organization, called on the Pakistani government to "undertake an independent and transparent investigation into Bhutto's assassination and fully cooperate with such an investigation."
