= List of ambassadors of Thailand to Peru =

Coordinates: 12.107175°S 77.053567°W

Ambassador of Thailand to Peru
- Incumbent; Pisanu Sobhon since July 13, 2023
- Inaugural holder: Charas Chaloemtiarana
- Formation: 1969

The Thai Ambassador in Lima is the official representative of the Government in Bangkok to the Government of Peru and is concurrently accredited in Bogotá and Quito.

== History ==
- From 1969 to December 1, 2006 the Thai Ambassador to Brazil was concurrently accredited in Lima.

== List of representatives ==
Diplomatic agreement/designated/Diplomatic accreditation	Ambassador	Thai language	Observations	List of prime ministers of Thailand	President of Peru	Term end
December 1, 2006	Apichart Varnayana	อภิชัยวานายานะ	Chargé d'affaires	Surayud Chulanont	Alan García	April 1, 2007
April 1, 2007	Withaya Punsuwan	วิทยา พูลสุวรรณ	residence in Bangkok. Deputy Minister of Foreign Affairs Spokesperson.	Surayud Chulanont	Alan García	January 1, 2008
February 1, 2008	Udomphol Ninnad	อุดมผล นินนาท		Samak Sundaravej	Alan García	January 1, 2011
February 1, 2011	Kasem Sailuenam	เกษม ศิระเจริญ	Chargé d'affaires	Yingluck Shinawatra	Alan García	April 1, 2011
April 1, 2011	Kamthorn Sithichoti	กำธร สิทธิโชติ	Thai Ambassador to Sri Lanka: In 2010 he was Chargé d'affaires of the Thai Ambassador to Malaysia.	Yingluck Shinawatra	Alan García	September 1, 2011
November 1, 2011	Ruengdej Mahasaranond	เรืองเดช มหาศรานนท์	Credentials presented on December 13, 2012.	Yingluck Shinawatra	Ollanta Humala	

- Peruvian Ambassador to Thailand
