= List of ambassadors of the Philippines to Peru =

Ambassador of the Republic of the Philippines to Peru
- Sugo ng Republika ng Pilipinas sa Peru; Embajador de la República de Filipinas en Perú
- Seal of the Department of Foreign Affairs of the Philippines
- Incumbent; Celeste S. Vinzón-Balatbát since 2022
- Department of Foreign Affairs
- Style: His Excellency
- Reports to: Department of Foreign Affairs
- Seat: Santiago
- Nominator: Secretary of Foreign Affairs
- Appointer: President of the Philippines; with the advice and consent of the Commission on Appointments
- Term length: No fixed term
- Final holder: Romeo A. Argüelles
- Abolished: 1993 (resident)

The Ambassador of the Republic of the Philippines to Peru (Filipino: Sugo ng Republika ng Pilipinas sa Peru; Spanish: Embajador de la República de Filipinas en Perú) is the Republic of the Philippines' foremost diplomatic representative in Peru, resident in Santiago, Chile.

Both countries formally established relations in 1974, but relations date back to the Spanish Empire. The embassy in Peru closed in 1993, and was also accredited to Colombia.

== List of representatives ==
Head of mission	Tenure begins	Tenure ends	Peruvian president	Philippine president	Note(s)
Ernesto C. Garrido		September 1, 1987	Alan García	Ferdinand Marcos; Corazon Aquino	
Romeo O. Fernández	April 1988	June 26, 1988	Alan García	Corazon Aquino	Fernández was appointed on November 3, 1987, but was ultimately advised against going to Peru due to an investigation regarding his wife, a suspected informant for the Soviet Union. Despite the warning, he left for Peru in April and presented his credentials after making arrangements. He ultimately left for Manila in June 1988.
Romeo A. Argüelles	August 25, 1988	1993	Alan García	Corazon Aquino	Argüelles presented his credentials on August 25.
1994–present: Accredited from Chile
José Macario Laurel IV	May 31, 1994	?	Alberto Fujimori	Fidel V. Ramos	First non-resident ambassador; son of Jose Laurel Jr.
Carmen Arceño	?	?	Alberto Fujimori	Joseph Estrada	
Marciano A. Paynor	2008	2008	Alan García	Gloria Macapagal Arroyo	Organiser and head of the Philippine delegation for the APEC 2008 summit.
María Consuelo Puyat-Reyes	c. 2008	2010	Alan García	Gloria Macapagal Arroyo	
Celeste S. Vinzón-Balatbát	2022	Incumbent	Pedro Castillo; Dina Boluarte; José Jerí; José María Balcázar; José María Balcázar; Keiko Fujimori	Rodrigo Duterte; Bongbong Marcos	

== See also ==
- Peru–Philippines relations
- List of ambassadors of Peru to the Philippines
