= Yosef Berty Fernandez =

Indonesian diplomat (born 1955)

Ambassador of Indonesia to Peru and Bolivia
- In office 20 January 2010 – 2013
- President: Susilo Bambang Yudhoyono
- Preceded by: I Gde Djelantik
- Succeeded by: Moenir Ari Soenanda

Personal details
- Born: March 20, 1955 (age 71) Flores, Lesser Sunda Province, Indonesia
- Spouse: Vivi Djanggur
- Children: 4
- Parents: Lukas Bertijan Fernandez (father); Katarina Nimat (mother)
- Education: Gadjah Mada University

Yosef Berty Fernandez (born 20 March 1955) is an Indonesian retired career diplomat who was Indonesia's ambassador to Peru and Bolivia from 2010 to 2013. Prior to his ambassadorial position, he was the chief of Papua's border and cooperation agency, serving under governor Barnabas Suebu. His diplomatic career cented around Latin America, with him having been posted to the Holy See, Colombia, and Mexico.

== Early life and education ==
Born in Flores on 20 March 1955, Fernandez is the third of nine children of Lukas Bertijan Fernandez, a driver, and Katarina Nimat, a farmer. Fernandez's family heavily relied on their mother's harvest for livelihood. Raised in a village with strong Catholic tradition in Ruteng, Flores, Fernandez attended the Saint Michael elementary school in Ruteng. Like many of his relatives who became monks, Fernandez initially aspired to become a clergyman and continued his secondary education at the Pius XII seminary in Kisol, Flores. At the end of high school, he felt that being a clergyman was not the right choice for him, and instead of transitioning into preparation for ordination he decided to enroll for the governance sciences major at the Gadjah Mada University.

== Diplomatic career ==
Fernandez applied for the foreign department in one go in 1983 upon graduating from the Gadjah Mada University. After completing basic diplomatic education, where he studied matters on international relations, international etiquette, and relations with the diplomat, Fernandez began working as a staff in the secretariat of the Directorate General of Politics. Three years later, in 1986 he was sent for his maiden posting overseas at the embassy in Vatican. He reached the diplomatic rank of third secretary and received the Order of St. Sylvester at the end of his service. He returned to Jakarta in 1990 to take office at the Europe directorate, where he was in charge of countries in South Erope.

After his stint in the Europe directorate, Fernandez duties shifted to handling Indonesia's relations with countries in Latin America. He afterwards became the chief of political section at the embassy in Colombia (1993 – 1998) and, following a stint in the America directorate (1998 – 2000), for the same position in Mexico from 2000 to 2004. During his first few years in Mexico, Fernandez worked under ambassador Barnabas Suebu. Fernandez was the embassy's chargé d'affaires in 2004, in which capacity he represented the Indonesian government as a signatory of the agreement on double taxation avoidance and prevention of fiscal evasion with Mexico.

Fernandez returned to the America directorate, working there in a middle level position from 2004 to 2006. Suebu, who was elected for a second term as governor of Papua in 2006, appointed Fernandez as the chief of the provincial border and cooperation agency, where he initiated the construction of facilities to improve the quality of life in border villages. He also took part in the repatriation of migrants to Papua New Guinea, stating that the repatriation process was voluntary and that the migrants returned in light of then-recent economic and security developments on the Indonesian side.

On 20 January 2010, Fernandez was sworn in as Indonesia's ambassador to Peru and Bolivia, resident in Lima. Shortly prior to his departure to Lima, in February 2010 Fernandez visited his hometown, where he was received with an official ceremony by officials from the local government, and his family organizing a thanksgiving mass to celebrate his appointment. A few months upon his arrival, he presented his credentials to the president of Peru Alan García on 15 July 2010. As ambassador, Fernandez learned spoken Spanish and closely observed political and economic developments in Peru. Fernandez concluded his ambassadorial duty in 2013 and he returned home as a senior official at the foreign ministry's policy research and assessment agency. On 22 May 2014, Fernandez received the Grand Cross of the Order of the Sun of Peru in recognition of his role in strengthening bilateral relations between Peru and Indonesia. In his retirement, Fernandez became a member of the Manggarai Institute, a think tank focusing on the development of the Manggarai Regency.

== Personal life ==
Fernandez is married to Vivi Djanggur and has four children.
