= I Gde Djelantik =

Indonesian diplomat

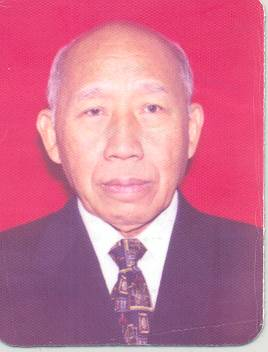

Ambassador of Indonesia to Peru, Bolivia, and Ecuador
- In office 11 November 2005 – 2010
- President: Susilo Bambang Yudhoyono
- Preceded by: I Gusti Ngurah Suwetja
- Succeeded by: Yosef Berty Fernandez

I Gde Djelantik is an Indonesian diplomat who was the ambassador to Peru, Bolivia, and Ecuador from 2005 to 2010. Around late 1990s, he was assigned to the embassy in Vienna as the chief of multilateral political affairs, with responsibilities on managing Indonesia's relations with UN agencies and other international organizations in Vienna. He was promoted to the higher diplomatic rank of minister counsellor and was posted to the embassy in Thailand as political affairs chief. On 5 October 2003, Gde Djelantik was sent to Berlin as the deputy chief of mission, becoming the chargé d'affaires ad interim during a brief period of ambassadorial vacancy in late 2004.

Gde Djelantik was nominated as ambassador to Peru, Bolivia, and Ecuador, based in Lima, in early 2005. After passing the parliamentary assessment by the House of Representatives first commission on 4 July 2005, he reported an extortion attempt by someone claiming to be the deputy chairman of the first commission, Effendy Choirie. Gde was sworn in on 11 November that year. During his tenure, he organized the provision of aid to the victims of the Tungurahua eruption in 2006. He received the state visit of president Susilo Bambang Yudhoyono in November 2008, who was in attendance for the 16th APEC Economic Leaders' Meeting in the country. His ambassadorial term ended in 2010.
