= List of ambassadors of Thailand to Egypt =

Ambassador of Thailand to Egypt
- Thanawat Sirikul
- Incumbent; Thanawat Sirikul since March 24, 2025
- Inaugural holder: Luang Dithakar Bhakdi
- Formation: January 12, 1955

The Ambassador of Thailand to Egypt is the official representative of Thailand to the Government of Egypt. The official title of the ambassador is the Ambassador Extraordinary and Plenipotentiary at the Royal Thai Embassy in Egypt, with the official post at the Royal Thai Embassy in Cairo. The current ambassador serves concurrently as the chief diplomat to Djibouti, Sudan and Ethiopia.

== List of representatives ==
Diplomatic agreement/designated/Diplomatic accreditation	Term beginning on Buddhist Calendar	Ambassador	Ambassador Thai Name	Thai Prime Minister	Egyptian Head of state	Term end	Term end on Buddhist Calendar
January 12, 1955	2503	Luang Dithakar Bhakdi	หลวงดิษฐการภักดี	Phibul Songkhram	Gamal Abdel Nasser	January 1, 1962	2505
January 1, 1962	2505	Thepkamol Devakula	หม่อมราชวงศ์เทพกมล เทวกุล	Sarit Dhanarajata	Gamal Abdel Nasser	January 1, 1966	2509
January 1, 1966	2509	Busna-arbhon Krairiksh	ภูษณ-อาภรณ์ ไกรฤกษ์	Thanom Kittikachorn	Gamal Abdel Nasser	January 1, 1968	2511
January 1, 1968	2511	Somchai Anuman Rajadhon	สมจัย อนุมานราชธน	Thanom Kittikachorn	Gamal Abdel Nasser	January 1, 1972	2515
January 1, 1972	2515	Nibhon Wilairat	นิพนธ์ วิไลรัตน์	Thanom Kittikachorn	Anwar as-Sadat	May 26, 1975	2518
May 26, 1975	2518	Sunthorn Suwansaran	สุนทร สุวรรณสาร	Seni Pramoj	Anwar as-Sadat	April 30, 1979	2522
June 17, 1979	2522	Kriengsak Sirimongkhon	เกรียงศักดิ์ ศิริมงคล	Kriangsak Chomanan	Anwar as-Sadat	December 18, 1979	2522
September 8, 1980	2523	Sukri Gajaseni	สุกรี คชเสนี	Prem Tinsulanonda	Anwar as-Sadat	June 5, 1985	2528
June 11, 1985	2528	Chamrat Chomphuphon	จำรัส ชมภูพล	Prem Tinsulanonda	Hosni Mubarak	November 23, 1988	2531
January 10, 1989	2532	Chuchai Kasemsarn	ชูชัย เกษมศานติ์	Chatichai Choonhavan	Hosni Mubarak	December 8, 1991	2534
January 6, 1991	2534	Rangsan Phaholyothin	รังสรรค์ พหลโยธิน	Anand Panyarachun	Hosni Mubarak	November 16, 1994	2537
December 11, 1994	2537	Boonthan Pirachwinichai	บุญทัน ไพรัชวินิจฉัย	Suchinda Kraprayoon	Hosni Mubarak	January 29, 1999	2542
March 7, 1999	2542	Warawit Kanithasen	วรวิทย์ กนิษฐะเสน	Chuan Leekpai	Hosni Mubarak	December 12, 2003	2546
January 8, 2004	2547	Charivat Santaputra	จริย์วัฒน์ สันตะบุตร	Thaksin Shinawatra	Hosni Mubarak	April 6, 2006	2549
April 6, 2006	2549	Noppadon Theppitak	นภดล เทพพิทักษ์	Surayud Chulanont	Hosni Mubarak	March 23, 2010	2553
April 6, 2010	2553	Chalit Manityakul	ชลิต มานิตยกุล	Samak Sundaravej	Hosni Mubarak	October 10, 2014	2557
October 16, 2014	2557	Peerasak Chantavarin	พีรศักดิ์ จันทวรินทร์	Prayut Chan-o-cha	Abdel Fattah el-Sisi	September 30, 2016	2559
March 20, 2017	2560	Chainarong Keratiyutwong	ชัยณรงค์ กีรติยุตวงศ์	Prayut Chan-o-cha	Abdel Fattah el-Sisi	2024	2567
March 24, 2025	2568	Thanawat Sirikul	ธนวัต ศิริกุล	Paetongtarn Shinawatra	Abdel Fattah el-Sisi		
