= List of ambassadors of Peru to Indonesia =

Ambassador of Peru to the Republic of Indonesia
- Great Seal of Peru
- Ministry of Foreign Affairs
- Appointer: The president of Peru
- Website: Embassy of Peru in Indonesia

The extraordinary and plenipotentiary ambassador of Peru to the Republic of Indonesia is the official representative of the Republic of Peru to the Republic of Indonesia.

The ambassador in Jakarta is also accredited to East Timor and ASEAN.

Both countries established diplomatic relations in 1975. Peru opened its embassy in 1992 and Indonesia opened its embassy in 2002.

== List of representatives ==
Name	Term begin	Term end	President	Notes
Elard Alberto Escala Sánchez-Barreto	1994	2000	Alberto Fujimori	As ambassador.
Nilo Figueroa Cortavarría	2000	2005	Alberto Fujimori	As ambassador; accredited to East Timor, and thus, the first representative to said state.
Juán José Álvarez Vita	December 30, 2005	2011	Alejandro Toledo	As ambassador; accredited to East Timor.
Roberto Hernán Seminario Portocarrero	March 20, 2012	2017	Ollanta Humala	As ambassador; accredited to East Timor and ASEAN.
Julio Arturo Cárdenas Velarde	June 1, 2017	February 11, 2021	Pedro Pablo Kuczynski	As ambassador; died in office.
Luis Raúl Tsuboyama Galván	February 1, 2022	2026	Pedro Castillo	As ambassador; accredited to East Timor.

== See also ==
- List of ambassadors of Indonesia to Peru
- List of ambassadors of Peru to the Philippines
