= Peru–Philippines relations =

- Peru: Philippines

Diplomatic mission
- Embassy of Peru, Bangkok, concurrent to the Philippines: Embassy of the Philippines, Santiago, concurrent to Peru

Peru–Philippines relations refers to the bilateral relations between the Republic of Peru and the Republic of the Philippines. Both countries are predominantly Roman Catholic and were ruled by the Spanish Empire for centuries. Neither country has a resident ambassador; the Philippines has a non-resident ambassador in Chile, and Peru has a non-resident ambassador in Thailand. Peru plans to reopen an embassy in Manila. Both countries are members of the Non-Aligned Movement, World Trade Organization, Asia-Pacific Economic Cooperation, and the United Nations.

== History ==
=== Early history ===
During the colonial period, there was significant trade between the two colonies. But there were frequent shifts and reversals of the trade volumes. Following the Spanish conquest of the Philippines in 1560, the islands became a focal point of trans-Pacific trade between Peru and China. Large quantities of silver were exported from Peru, whilst luxury goods such as silk were imported from China via the Philippines. However, in 1581 the Spanish crown awarded monopoly to the port of Acapulco for the trade over the Pacific. However, the traders of Peru continued to trade with the Philippines, in violation of the Royal Decree. Gonzalo Ronquillo de Peñalosa, the governor-general of the Philippines, sent galleons to Peru in 1581 and 1582 carrying the message that trade with Manila was illegal. Though illegal, the trade continued in secret. Benefiting from cheaper Asian goods; a commercial alliance between Mexico, Manila and Lima was formed against Madrid which imposed more expensive imports from the Spanish capital due to their forced monopoly. The smuggling of Chinese goods to Peru involved both Peruvian merchants and politicians.

As of the early 17th century, there were significant imports of Chinese goods to the cities of Lima and Potosí. The peak year was 1602, when the imports from Asia was estimated at a value of 5 million pesos. Meanwhile, Peru sent colonists and soldiers to the Philippines. In 1635 the former governor of Panama, Don Sebastián Hurtado de Corcuera, brought a large number of Peruvian soldiers and colonists to settle the Fortress-City of Zamboanga in the Philippines. In 1793, the Philippines Company was given permission to resume exports to Peru.

=== 19th century ===
After the Latin American wars of independence, Peruvians were among the Latin-Americans which supported the self-proclaimed Emperor of the Philippines, Andres Novales, in his failed revolt against Spain.

=== 20th century ===
Peru recognised the Philippines as an independent state in 1946. Before an embassy was opened in Peru, Philippine interests in the country were represented by the U.S. embassy.

=== 21st century ===
In 2003, Peru closed its embassy in Manila. In 2006, an honorary consulate was opened in a two-store house in Miraflores District, Lima. This building and an adjacent house were demolished to make way for a new building to represent the mission, which was opened in 2010.

In 2008, Philippine President Gloria Macapagal Arroyo and Peruvian President Alan García held bilateral talks and shared commonalities talking about the kinship between their two countries. Following on the meeting of the two Presidents, it was announced in 2008 that the re-introduction of the Spanish language in Philippine schools in 2009 would be a very timely move as the Philippines and Peru had agreed to expand their diplomatic, bilateral and trade relations. In 2009, a Philippines Department of Education order titled a Mother Tongue-Based Multilingual Education (MLE) detailed a planned educational methodology which did not involve the Spanish language.

In 2023, Peruvian President Dina Boluarte announced that her country will reopen an embassy in Manila.

== High-level visits ==
High-level visits from the Philippines to Peru

- President Gloria Macapagal Arroyo (2008)

High-level visits from Peru to the Philippines

- President Ollanta Humala (2015)

== Diplomatic missions ==
- Peru is accredited to the Philippines from its embassy in Bangkok, Thailand.
- The Philippines is accredited to Peru from its embassy in Santiago, Chile.

== See also ==
- List of ambassadors of Peru to the Philippines
- List of ambassadors of the Philippines to Peru
