= List of ambassadors of Peru to the Philippines =

List of Peruvian ambassadors to the Philippines

Ambassador of Peru to the Republic of the Philippines
- Embajador del Perú en la República de Filipinas
- Great Seal of Peru
- Incumbent; Carmen del Rocío Azurín Araujo since June 3, 2026
- Ministry of Foreign Affairs
- Style: Her Excellency
- Residence: Embassy of Peru, Manila, Philippines
- Appointer: The President of Peru

The extraordinary and plenipotentiary ambassador of Peru to the Republic of the Philippines was the official representative of the Republic of Peru to the Republic of the Philippines. The ambassador in Manila was also accredited to neighbouring Malaysia and Indonesia.

Both countries established relations in 1974, and Peru maintained an embassy in Manila until 2003. Since the embassy's closure, Peru has been represented to the Philippines from its embassy in Bangkok.

== List of representatives ==
Name	Portrait	Term begin	Term end	President	Notes
Guillermo Nieto Heredia		1980	1982	Fernando Belaúnde	As ambassador; accredited to Thailand.
Fortunato Isasi Cayo		1983	1987	Fernando Belaúnde	As ambassador; accredited to Thailand.
Julio Balbuena		1988	1991	Alberto Fujimori	As ambassador; accredited to Thailand and Indonesia.
Jaime Antonio Pomareda Montenegro		1995	1998	Alberto Fujimori	As ambassador.
Julio Arturo Cárdenas Velarde		1999	2001	Alberto Fujimori	As ambassador. He died in Manila in 2021, during his tenure as ambassador to Indonesia.
Jorge Chávez Soto		2002	2003	Alejandro Toledo	Final ambassador prior to closure of embassy.
Embassy closed (2003–2025)
Carmen del Rocío Azurín Araujo		June 3, 2026	Incumbent	José María Balcázar	First resident ambassador following the reopening of the embassy.

== See also ==
- List of ambassadors of the Philippines to Peru
- List of ambassadors of Peru to Thailand
- List of ambassadors of Peru to Indonesia
