= Indonesia–Peru relations =

- Indonesia: Peru

Indonesia–Peru relations are the bilateral and diplomatic relations between the Republic of Indonesia and the Republic of Peru since 1975. Both nations see each other as an attractive market with good prospects and potentials, and seeks to boost trade relations. Indonesia has an embassy in Lima, while Peru has an embassy in Jakarta. Indonesia and Peru are members of multilateral organizations such as the Asia-Pacific Economic Cooperation, the World Trade Organization (WTO), Non-Aligned Movement and Forum of East Asia-Latin America Cooperation.

== History ==
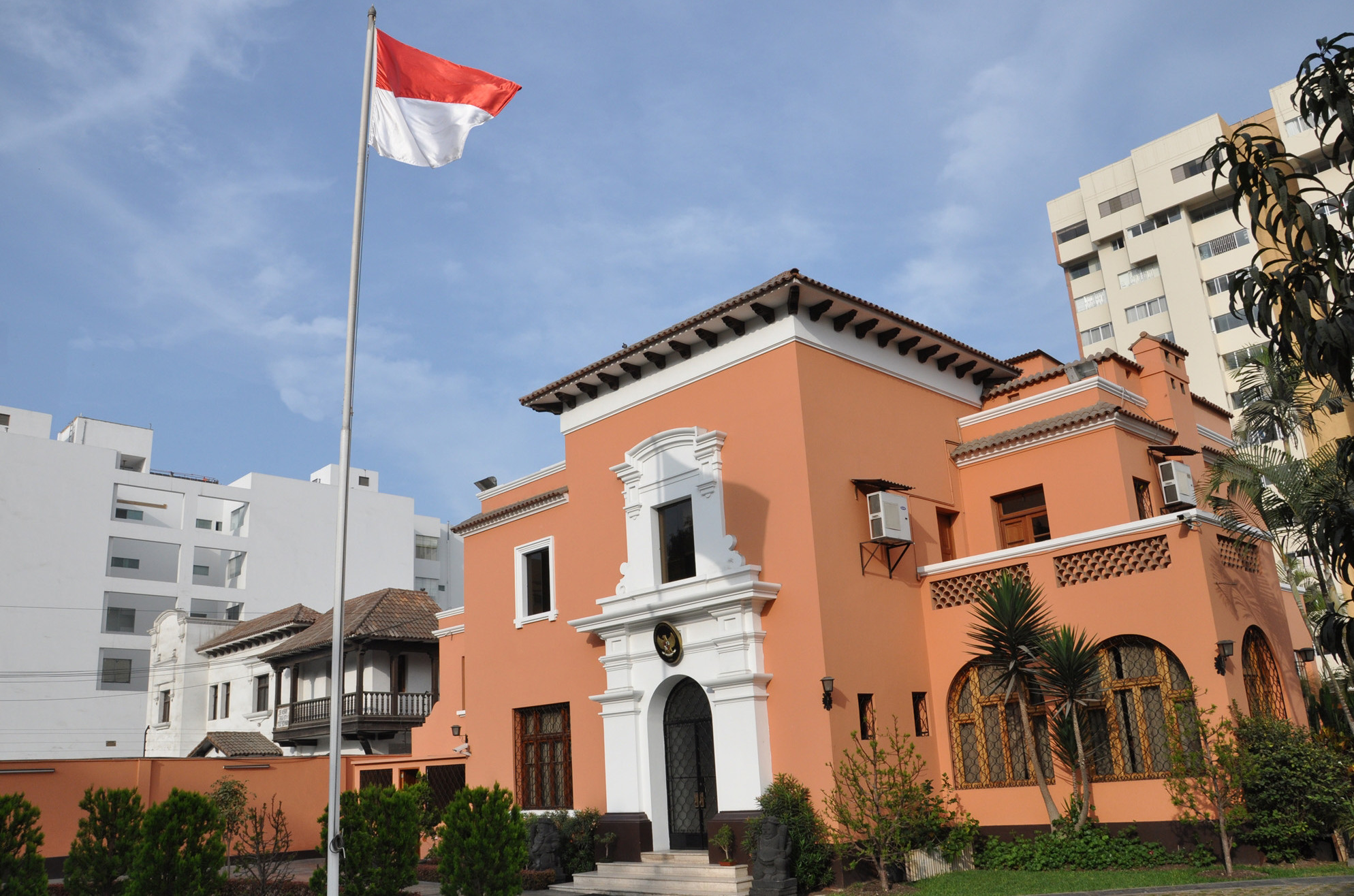
The Indonesian embassy in Lima.

Established on 12 August 1975, the Indonesian mission to Peru at the time was accredited through the Indonesian embassy in Brasilia. The Peruvian government opened its embassy in Jakarta on 1 November 1992. Considering the ineffectiveness and the need to strengthen the cooperation with Peru, the Indonesian government opened the Indonesian embassy in Lima on 20 February 2002. The flag of ASEAN was flown for the first time on 7 October 2011, in a ceremony conducted at 10 a.m. and hosted by the ambassador.

During Indonesian President Prabowo Subianto's state visit to Peru on 14 November 2024, he and Peruvian President Dina Boluarte discussed ways to expand bilateral relations. The two presidents then continued their bilateral discussion by joining their respective delegations to discuss strategic cooperation across a range of topics. They saw their respective foreign ministers sign the Visa Exemption Agreement for Holders of Diplomatic and Service or Special Passports. Ultimately, the two presidents decided to strengthen Indonesian-Peruvian collaboration. Boluarte reciprocated by visiting Indonesia in August 2025. During her visit, Prabowo gave her Indonesia's highest civilian accolade in celebration of the country's 50 years of bilateral relations with Peru. Boluarte extended an invitation to Indonesian businesspeople to invest in Peru in various fields, including technology, industry, and logistics.

== Trade and investment ==
Peruvian investors were seeking opportunities in Indonesia, such as the soft drink company, Big Cola, had entered the Indonesian market and doing very well, which inspires more Peruvian investors that may follow in the future. According to the data from the Indonesian Central Statistics Agency (BPS), trade between Peru and Indonesia reaching US$213.37 million in 2011. The trade balance heavily favors Indonesia, which mainly exports rubber, wood products, sports shoes, paper, garments, motorcycle spare parts, aluminum, glass, ceramics, plastic and electronics to Peru. On the other hand, Indonesia imports fish meal, animal feed, medicines, grapes, wheat and fertilizers from Peru. In October 2013, Indonesia and Peru signed a memorandum of understanding (MoU) on agriculture cooperation.

On 11 August 2025, the two nations signed a Comprehensive Economic Partnership Agreement (CEPA). Under this trade agreement, 56% of Peru's exports to Indonesia, including cocoa, blueberries, avocados, coffee, mangoes, and zinc, will be eligible for tariff-free entry. Until 86% of Peruvian items are tariff-free, the remaining products will enjoy tariff-free durations ranging from five to ten years.

On September 1, 2025, 40-year-old Zetro Leonardo Purba was fatally shot in Lince District. A diplomat of the Indonesian embassy, Purba had arrived to the country five months prior to his death. Five foreigners were later arrested in San Martín de Porres District in connection to the crime.

== See also ==
- Foreign relations of Indonesia
- Foreign relations of Peru
- List of ambassadors of Indonesia to Peru
- List of ambassadors of Peru to Indonesia
