= List of ambassadors of Peru to Thailand =

Coordinates: 13.745690°N 100.551482°E

Ambassador of Peru to the Kingdom of Thailand
- Great Seal of Peru
- Ministry of Foreign Affairs
- Inaugural holder: Julio Eduardo Sarmiento Calmet
- Formation: September 3, 1966
- Website: Embassy of Peru in Thailand; Secondary Website

The extraordinary and plenipotentiary ambassador of Peru to the Kingdom of Thailand is the official representative of the Republic of Peru to the Kingdom of Thailand.

As of December 2022, the Ambassador is also accredited to Myanmar and the Philippines. The latter's Peruvian embassy closed in 2003.

== List of representatives ==
Diplomatic agreement/designated/Diplomatic accreditation	Ambassador	Observations	President of Peru	Prime Minister of Thailand	Term end
September 3, 1966	Julio Eduardo Sarmiento Calmet	resident Peruvian Ambassador to India.	Nicolás Lindley López	Thanom Kittikachorn	December 31, 1972
1972	René Hooper López	resident Peruvian Ambassador to India. Ambassador of Peru in India and Iran.	Juan Velasco Alvarado	Thanom Kittikachorn	1975
1975	José Luis Garaycochea Bustamante	Chargé d'affaires of the resident Peruvian Ambassador to India. (1946	Francisco Morales Bermúdez	Seni Pramoj	1978
1979	César Espejo Romero	resident Peruvian Ambassador to Japan. Peruvian Ambassador to China	Francisco Morales Bermúdez	Kriangsak Chomanan	July 1, 1981
1980	Guillermo Nieto Heredia	resident Peruvian Ambassador to the Philippines. (* August 30, 1934); graduate, Pontifica Universidad Catolica del Peru with a degree in international relations from Academia Diplomatica de Peru. Took post graduate courses, London School of Economics. Guillermo Nieto Heredia nació en 1934, primogénito de una familia de larga tradición castrense. Luego de hacer el colegio militar, como requería la tradición, inició su carrera artística en la Asociación de Artistas Aficionados (AAA), mientras	Fernando Belaúnde Terry	Prem Tinsulanonda	February 28, 1982
1984	Fortunato Isasi Cayo	resident Peruvian Ambassador to the Philippines.	Fernando Belaúnde Terry	Prem Tinsulanonda	1987
1988	Julio Balbuena	resident Peruvian Ambassador to the Philippines.	Alán García Pérez	Chatichai Choonhavan	November 30, 1991
August 15, 1992	Juan Koster Koster	Chargé d'affaires	Alberto Fujimori	Suchinda Kraprayoon	April 16, 1995
August 17, 1995	Óscar Maúrtua		Alberto Fujimori	Banharn Silpa-Archa	August 31, 1999
October 5, 1999	Jorge Castañeda Mendez		Alberto Fujimori	Chuan Leekpai	January 14, 2002
June 1, 2002	Gabriel Ignacio García Pike		Alejandro Toledo Manrique	Thaksin Shinawatra	November 18, 2002
January 1, 2002	José Bustinza Soto	Chargé d'affaires	Alejandro Toledo Manrique	Thaksin Shinawatra	February 4, 2005
February 5, 2005	Carlos Velasco Mendiola		Alejandro Toledo Manrique	Thaksin Shinawatra	March 31, 2010
August 15, 2010	Jorge Castañeda Mendez		Alan García	Samak Sundaravej	
April 11, 2014	Félix Ricardo Americo Antonio Denegri Boza		Ollanta Humala	Yingluck Shinawatra	October 30, 2016
May 1, 2017			Fernando Quirós Campos	Prayut Chan-o-cha	April 30, 2022
June 2022			Cecilia Galarreta	Prayut Chan-o-cha	December 2022

== See also ==
- List of ambassadors of Thailand to Peru
- List of ambassadors of Peru to the Philippines
