= Moenir Ari Soenanda =

Indonesian diplomat (born 1955)

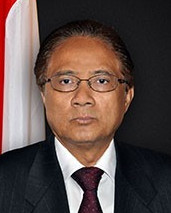

Ambassador of Indonesia to Peru and Bolivia
- In office 14 February 2014 – October 2017
- President: Susilo Bambang Yudhoyono; Joko Widodo
- Preceded by: Yosef Berty Fernandez
- Succeeded by: Marina Estella Anwar Bey

Personal details
- Born: 22 August 1955 (age 71) Nganjuk, Indonesia
- Spouse: Evi Supiyati
- Children: 4
- Education: Diponegoro University (S.H.)

Moenir Ari Soenanda (born 22 August 1955) is an Indonesian retired diplomat who last served as ambassador to Peru and Bolivia. Previously, he served as the consul general in Penang and deputy chief of mission in Moscow.

== Early life and education ==
Born on 22 August 1955 in Nganjuk, Moenir received his bachelor's degree in international law from the Diponegoro University in 1979.

== Diplomatic career ==
Moenir joined the diplomatic service in 1980 and completed his basic diplomatic education a year after. He served in the directorate of international treaties from 1981 to 1982, during which he was involved in negotiations on the United Nations Convention on the Law of the Sea. He then undertook his first overseas posting as a political staff at the embassy in Brasília from 1982 to 1984. During the 1987 Indonesian legislative election in Brasilia, Moenir became a member of the overseas election committee.

He returned to Indonesia in 1988 as the chief of the international civil law section within the directorate of international treaties. After a three-year stint, in 1991 he undertook mid-level diplomatic education. He was then assigned to the embassy in Seoul as its spokesperson from 1992 to 1995. Returning to the directorate of international treaties, Moenir served as the deputy director (chief of subdirectorate) for political and security treaties from 1997 to 1999. During this period, in 1997 he underwent senior diplomatic education. He also represented Indonesia as a delegate to the Rome Diplomatic Conference in 1998, which established the International Criminal Court.

Moenir was posted to the embassy in Paris from 1999 to 2003 as the chief of economic affairs with the rank of counsellor, and later chief of political affairs with the rank of minister-counsellor. During his tenure, in 2002 Moenir was involved in negotiations regarding the Ligitan and Sipadan territorial dispute at the International Court of Justice. After serving in Paris, from 2004 to 2007 Moenir became the chief of the foreign ministry's policy assessment and development agency for the Asia and Pacific area.

On 12 February 2007, Moenir was installed as consul general in Penang. During his tenure, he criticized Malaysian companies operating in Indonesia for the haze in Malaysia. He was the consul general for three years until 2010, and upon his return was assigned as a senior advisor to the foreign department's policy assessment and development agency. He was then posted in Moscow, serving as the deputy chief of mission from 2012 to 2014. Several months into his duty, he became the embassy's chargé d'affaires ad interim, during which he was involved in promoting cooperation in the energy, oil and gas sector, and sister city partnership between the two countries.

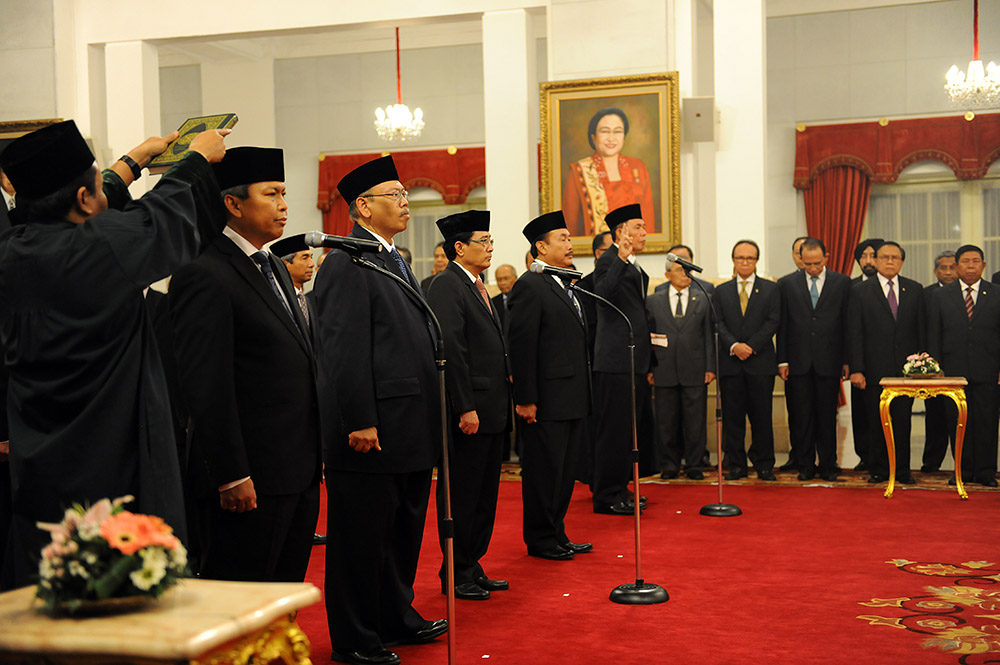
Moenir (fourth from left) being installed as ambassador in 2014.

In September 2013, Moenir was nominated by President Susilo Bambang Yudhoyono as ambassador to Peru, with concurrent accreditation to Bolivia. After undergoing an assessment by the House of Representative's first commission on 17 September 2013, Moenir was sworn in on 14 February 2014. He presented his credentials to the President of Peru Ollanta Humala on 16 May 2014 and to the President of Bolivia Evo Morales on 13 October 2014. During his tenure, Moenir initiated a sister heritage program between Peru's Machu Picchu and Indonesia's Borobudur and business forum with Bolivian businesspersons. He announced his departure from his ambassadorship in October 2017.

== Personal life ==
Moenir is married to Evi Supiyati and has three daughters and a son.
