= Tharit Charungvat =

Thai diplomat

- ธฤต จรุงวัฒน์
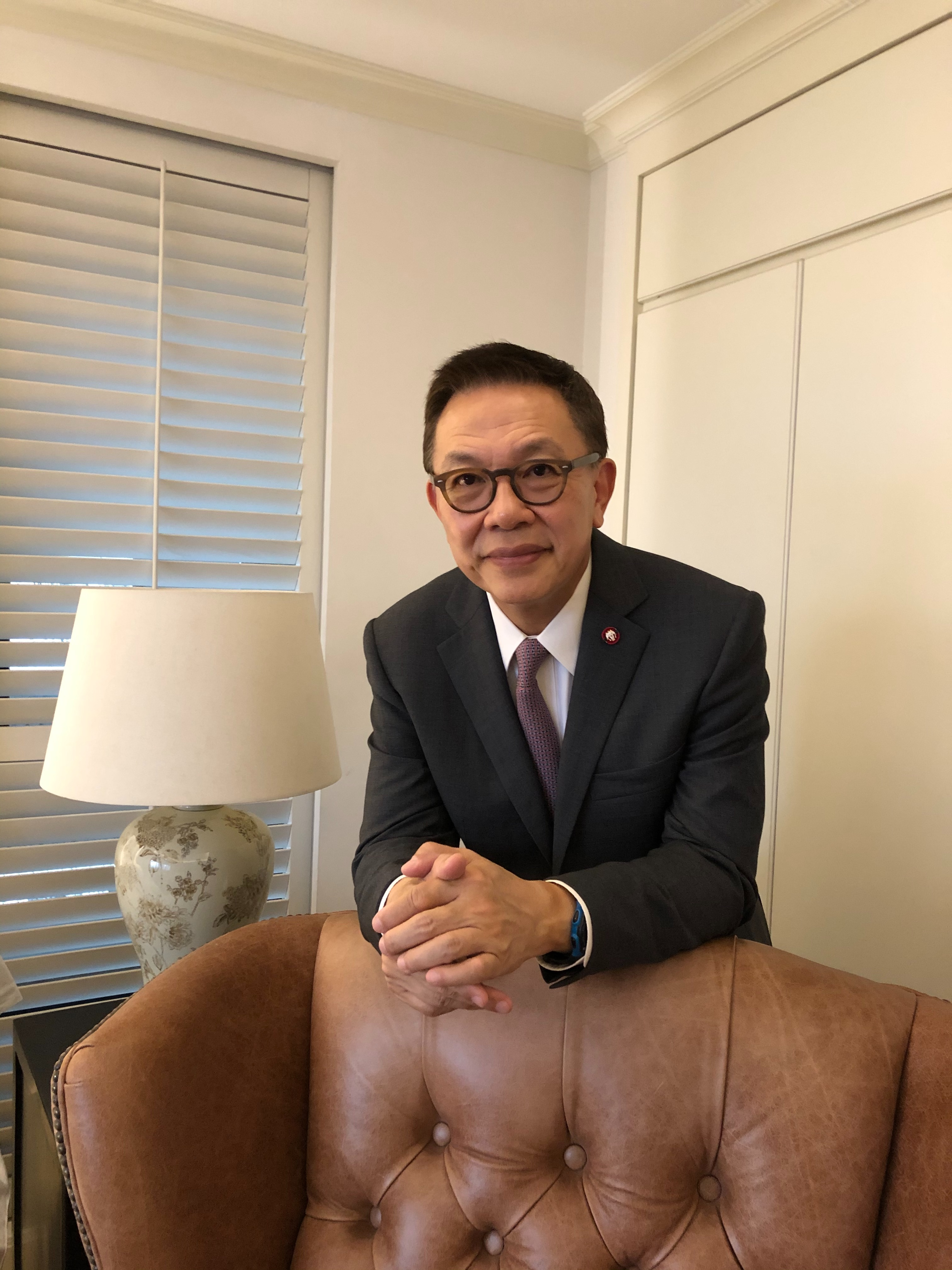
- Ambassador Tharit Charungvat in Bangkok, Thailand, 2019

Honorary Adviser, Committee on Foreign Affairs, House of Representatives of Thailand
- Incumbent
- Assumed office January 2020

Secretary-General, Thailand Foundation
- Incumbent
- Assumed office December 2019

Member, 20 Years National Strategy Committee
- Incumbent
- Assumed office September 2017

Ambassador of Thailand to the Republic of Turkey
- In office 2013–2016

Ambassador of Thailand to the Federative Republic of Brazil
- In office 2011–2013

Ambassador of Thailand to the Republic of South Africa
- In office 2009–2011

Director-General, Department of Information
- In office 2007–2009

Director-General, Department of South Asia, Middle East and African Affairs
- In office 2006–2007

Ambassador Attached to the Ministry
- In office 2004–2006

Personal details
- Born: Thailand
- Spouse: Vithu Charungvat
- Children: Varine Charungvat
- Education: The American University; Chulalongkorn University

Tharit Charungvat is a former career diplomat from Thailand with more than 30 years of experience in the Thai Foreign Service. After his retirement from the Ministry of Foreign Affairs of Thailand in September 2016, he currently is, among others, Secretary-General of Thailand Foundation and Honorary Adviser to the Committee on Foreign Affairs of the House of Representatives of Thailand.

== Career ==
Ambassador Tharit Charungvat first joined the Ministry of Foreign Affairs of Thailand in 1980 as an Attaché in the ASEAN Department. After serving as Third and Second Secretary in the Policy and Planning Division of the Ministry, he was posted to the Thai Embassy in Brussels, Belgium from 1990 – 1994 as Second and then First Secretary responsible for Thai-European Community relations. He then returned to Thailand to serve as Counselor in the Department of Information before moving on in 1997 to begin 8 years of close association with China as the Director of Division III of the Department of East Asian Affairs, which oversees Chinese affairs. This was followed by postings in 1999 to the Royal Thai Consulate-General in Kunming, PRC as the Deputy Consul-General, and then to Hong Kong in 2003 as the Consul-General.

He returned to Thailand in 2004 to take up the post of Ambassador-at-Large at the Foreign Ministry, and over the next two years helped to lay a new ground work for the Ministry’s entry into the digital age of information management and connectivity. In 2006, he moved on to serve as the Director-General of the Department of South Asia, Middle East and African Affairs, overseeing Thailand’s bilateral and multilateral relations with more than eighty countries from the African continent through the Middle East to the Indian sub-continent. In 2007 he was appointed as Director-General of the Department of Information and the Official Spokesperson of the Ministry during a sensitive period in Thai-Cambodian relations.

He would hold this post for two and half years until mid-2009 when he began his Ambassadorship assignment abroad, which would see him posted to three important emerging economies successively until his retirement. He first returned to familiar territory by being appointed Ambassador of Thailand to the Republic of South Africa and accredited to ten additional countries in the Southern African region, namely Angola, Botswana, Lesotho, Malawi, Mauritius, Mozambique, Namibia, Swaziland, Zambia and Zimbabwe. During his time in South Africa, he worked to promote and expand trade, tourism and people to people ties between Thailand and southern Africa. Ambassador Charungvat then moved on at the end of 2011 to become Ambassador of Thailand to the Federative Republic of Brazil. Over one and a half years in Brazil, he worked to further enhance trade, business and investment ties between Thailand and Brazil. In late-2013 he was appointed to his final posting as Ambassador of Thailand to the Republic of Turkey and accredited also to Azerbaijan, Georgia, Macedonia and Turkmenistan. During his time in Turkey, which he held until his retirement in September 2016, he helped to promote synergy in security, investment and tourism cooperation, along with people-to-people relations between Thailand and Turkey.

After retirement, he continues to receive important assignments from the Ministry of Foreign Affairs, including, among others, being elected to serve on the Ministry's Civil Service Sub-Commission. He also advises the Ministry on Ministry Reforms.

At the national level, since 2017 he has been part of Thailand's 20 Years National Strategy Committee (NSC) as a member of the National Strategy Drafting Committee on Competitiveness Enhancement to develop Thailand's competitiveness strategy.

In 2019, during Thailand's Chairmanship of ASEAN, which entailed hosting the ASEAN Summit and various ASEAN-related meetings, he was called upon to oversee the management and logistics of all ASEAN-related meetings hosted by Thailand throughout the year, including the Summit among ASEAN leaders in August and the Summit in November between ASEAN leaders and Dialogue Partners and other world leaders, including the Secretary-General of the United Nations.

In December 2019, he became the Secretary-General of Thailand Foundation, which is responsible for Thailand's Public Diplomacy outreach.

From January 2020 onward, he was also appointed Honorary Adviser to the Committee on Foreign Affairs of Thailand's House of Representatives.

== Chronology ==
Year	Event
1980	Joined the Ministry of Foreign Affairs of Thailand (MFA) as an Attaché in the ASEAN Department
1984	Third Secretary, Office of the Permanent Secretary, MFA-Thailand
1986	Third Secretary, Policy and Planning Division, Office of the Permanent Secretary, MFA-Thailand
1990	Second Secretary, Royal Thai Embassy, Brussels
1995	Counselor, Public and Cultural Affairs Division, Department of Information, MFA-Thailand
1996	Secretariat to Department, Department of East Asian Affairs, MFA-Thailand
1997	Director, Division III, Department of East Asian Affairs, MFA-Thailand
1999	Deputy Consul-General, Royal Thai Consulate-General, Kunming, PRC
2003	Consul-General, Royal Thai Consulate-General, Hong Kong
2004	Ambassador Attached to the Ministry, Office of the Permanent Secretary, MFA-Thailand
2006	Director-General, Department of South Asian, Middle East and African Affairs, MFA-Thailand
2007	Director-General, Department of Information, MFA-Thailand
2009	Ambassador Extraordinary and Plenipotentiary of Thailand to the Republic of South Africa
2012	Ambassador Extraordinary and Plenipotentiary of Thailand to the Federative Republic of Brazil
2013	Ambassador Extraordinary and Plenipotentiary of Thailand to the Republic of Turkey
September 2016	Retired from the Ministry of Foreign Affairs of Thailand
September 2017	Member, 20 Years National Strategy Committee
December 2019	Secretary-General of the Thailand Foundation
January 2020	Honorary Adviser, Committee on Foreign Affairs, House of Representatives of Thailand

== Education and personal life ==
Ambassador Charungvat earned a Bachelor of Arts degree in International Relations from Chulalongkorn University in Bangkok, Thailand, and a Master of Arts degree in International Affairs – Asian Study and International Economic Development from The American University in Washington, D.C., U.S.A. He also completed Thailand’s National Defence College curriculum in 2004.

Ambassador Charungvat is married to Mrs. Vithu Charungvat with one child.

== Decorations received ==
Year	Decoration
2014	Knight Grand Cordon (Special Class) of the Most Exalted Order of the White Elephant (มหาปรมาภรณ์ช้างเผือก)
2013	Order of Rio Branco, Class Grand Cross (Ordem de Rio Branco, Grã Cruz) (Brazil)
2009	Knight Grand Cordon (Special Class) of the Most Noble Order of the Crown of Thailand (มหาวชิรมงกูฎ)
2006	Knight Grand Cross (First Class) of the Most Exalted Order of the White Elephant (ประถมาภรณ์ช้างเผือก)
2005	The Chakra Mala Medal (เหรียญจักรพรรดิมาลา)
2003	Knight Grand Cross (First Class) of the Most Noble Order of the Crown of Thailand (ประถมาภรณ์มงกุฏไทย)
1999	Knight Commander (Second Class) of the Most Exalted Order of the White Elephant (ทวิติยาภรณ์ช้างเผือก)
1994	Knight Commander (Second Class) of the Most Noble Order of the Crown of Thailand (ทวิติยาภรณ์มงกุฏไทย)
1992	Commander (Third Class) of the Most Exalted Order of the White Elephant (ตริตาภรณ์ช้างเผือก)
1988	Commander (Third Class) of the Most Noble Order of the Crown of Thailand (ตริตาภรณ์มงกุฏไทย)
1985	Companion (Fourth Class) of the Most Exalted Order of the White Elephant (จัตุรถาภรณ์ช้างเผือก)

== See also ==
- Ministry of Foreign Affairs of Thailand
- Foreign relations of Thailand
- List of diplomatic missions of Thailand
