= Marina Estella Anwar Bey =

Indonesian diplomat (born 1958)

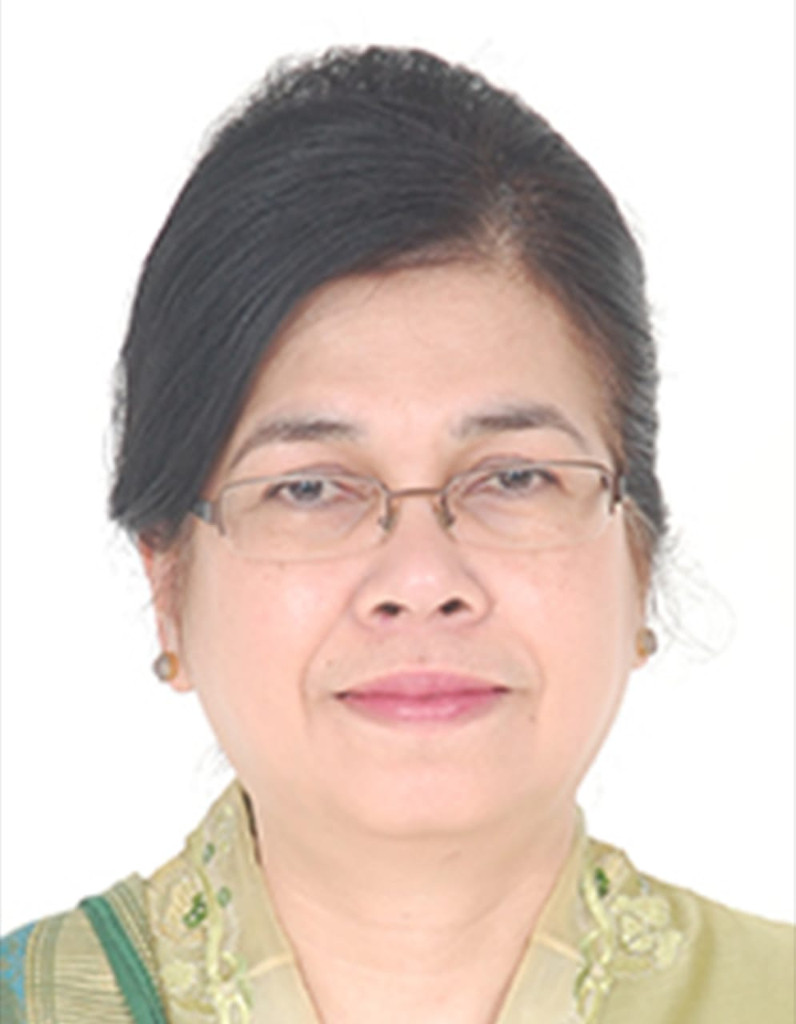

Ambassador of Indonesia to Peru and Bolivia
- In office 20 February 2018 – 30 January 2023
- President: Joko Widodo
- Preceded by: Moenir Ari Soenanda
- Succeeded by: Ricky Suhendar

Personal details
- Born: 21 May 1958 (age 68)
- Children: 1
- Education: University of Indonesia (Dra.)

Marina Estella Anwar Bey (born 21 May 1958) is an Indonesian retired diplomat who last served as ambassador to Peru and Bolivia from 2018 to 2023. She previously served as consul general in Hamburg from 2014 to 2018 and secretary of the America and Europe directorate general from 2014 to 2018.

== Early life and education ==
Marina was born on 21 May 1958. His father, Anwar Bey, was a military judge who participated in the trials of the 30 September Movement. Marina studied German literature at the University of Indonesia and graduated with a bachelor's degree in 1977.

== Diplomatic career ==
Marina was inspired to join the diplomatic service after reading articles about Africa as a student. After being accepted to the foreign department in 1985, she underwent a training for junior diplomats by the German Foundation for International Development (Deutschen Stiftung für Internationale Entwicklung, DSE) in West Berlin in 1988. She received her first overseas assignment at the embassy in Bern from 1989 to 1993. Following this, she took on the role of head of economic section at the consulate general in Toronto, Canada, from 1995 to 1998. After serving in Toronto, she was recalled to Jakarta as deputy director (chief of subdirectorate) for energy within the directorate of economic relations with developing countries from 1999 to 2001.

She then served as head of economic section at the embassy in Berlin from 2001 with the rank of minister counsellor. After four years, in 2005 she was transferred to serve as deputy director of the 2nd region in the directorate of Asia, Pacific, and Africa interregional cooperation. She served until 2007 and was subsequently promoted to become the chief of the foreign ministry's policy analysis and development agency for the Asia, Pacific, and Africa region until 2010.

On 30 July 2010, Marina was sworn in as consul general in Hamburg. According to her, Hamburg was her dream assignment ever since she was posted in Berlin. She received her exequatur from the German federal government on 12 October 2010, with her area of duty covering the states of Bremen, Hamburg, Lower Saxony, and Schleswig-Holstein. During her tenure as consul general, Marina promoted Indonesia through cultural exhibitions and lectures. She also gave birth to her only daughter during her duty in Hamburg. For her effort in strengthening bilateral relations with the Hamburg government, Marina received the Ritzebüttel Portugaleser medal from the Hamburg Senate. She departed from Hamburg in early July 2014.

After serving in Hamburg, Marina became the secretary of the America and Europe directorate general from 2014, serving until 2018. In October 2017 Marina was nominated by President Joko Widodo as ambassador to Peru, with concurrent accreditation Bolivia. Upon passing an assessment by the House of Representative's first commission between 23 and 24 October 2017, she was sworn in as ambassador on 20 February 2018. She presented her credentials to the President of Peru Martin Vizcarra on 18 July 2018 and to the President of Bolivia Evo Morales on 26 December 2018. Towards the end of her tenure, she became the Chair of the ASEAN Committee in Lima.

Marina's core vision was to advance bilateral relations, particularly in the economic and tourism sectors, aiming to position the two South American countries as hubs for Indonesian products entering other Latin American markets. She actively worked to promote trade, tourism, language, and culture through various initiatives, including trade fair participation, business consultations, tourism promotion, and the provision of Darmasiswa and Developing Country scholarships. Under her leadership, the embassy held culinary festival and cooking class, as her effort to promote Indonesia's existence through gastrodiplomacy. Participants of Indonesian language and culture courses also grew significantly during her tenure. A major agenda item under her leadership was the push for the resumption of the Trade in Goods agreement negotiations between Indonesia and Peru and advocating for visa-free entry for Indonesian citizens to Bolivia.

During the COVID-19 pandemic, Marina was involved in organizing the repatriation of four Indonesian citizens in Peru, following instructions from Peru's foreign minister to immediately repatriate foreign citizens who were visiting Peru. The embassy also conducted registration on all Indonesians living in Peru and provided provisions to assist Indonesian nationals working in sectors like hospitality, restaurants, and spas in both Peru and Bolivia. On 20 January 2023, Marina announced her departure in a farewell ceremony at the embassy, which was attended by ambassadors from various nations. Marina handed over her duties as ambassador to chargé d'affaires ad interim Rangga Yudha Nagara on 30 January 2023.
