= Thepkamol Devakula =

Thai ambassador and politician

Mom Rajawongse Thepkamol Devakula
- เทพกมล เทวกุล
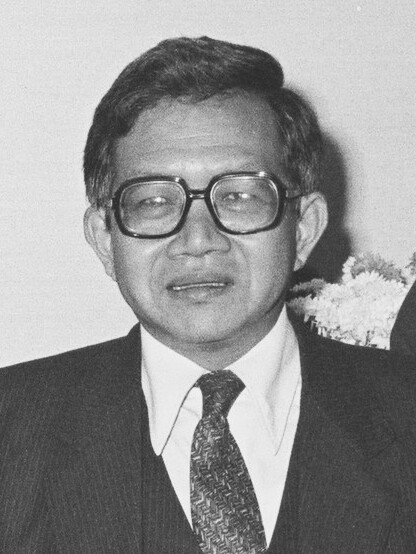

Deputy Minister of Foreign Affairs
- In office 27 September 1996 – 24 November 1996
- Foreign minister: Amnuay Viravan
- Preceded by: Pracha Guna-Kasem
- Succeeded by: Pitak Intrawityanunt

Thai Ambassador to France
- In office 1990–1995
- Prime Minister: Chatichai Choonhavan
- Preceded by: Wichian Watanakun
- Succeeded by: Tej Bunnag

Personal details
- Born: April 12, 1936 (age 90) Bangkok, Thailand
- Education: Middle Temple
- Profession: Diplomat

Mom Rajawongse Thepkamol Devakula (Thai: หม่อมราชวงศ์เทพกมล เทวกุล); born (April 12, 1936) is the son of Prince Wongsanuwat Devakula and Princess Kamolpramoj Kitiyakara. Mom Rajawongse Thepkamol Devakula is a former Thai Ambassador to France and Burma, has served as Permanent Secretary of the Ministry of Foreign Affairs, and was a member of the Senate.

After a career in the foreign service, Thepkamol Devakula was appointed to the Privy Council of the King of Thailand, Bhumibol Adulyadej on August 7, 1997. Mom Rajawongse Thepkamol Devakula and his wife, Khunying Kwanta Devakula, have three daughters.
