= Foreign relations of India =

India, officially the Republic of India, has full diplomatic relations with 201 states, including Palestine, the Holy See, Niue and the Cook Islands. (Note: Including all 193 UN member countries and 8 dependencies.) The Ministry of External Affairs (MEA) is the government agency responsible for the conduct of foreign relations of India. With the world's fifth largest military expenditure, second largest armed force, sixth largest economy by GDP nominal rates and third largest economy in terms of purchasing power parity, India is a prominent regional power and a potential superpower.

According to the MEA, the main purposes of Indian diplomacy include protecting India's national interests, promoting friendly relations with other states, and providing consular services to "foreigners and Indian nationals abroad." In recent decades, India has pursued an expansive foreign policy, including the neighborhood-first policy embodied by SAARC as well as the Look East policy to forge more extensive economic and strategic relationships with East and Southeast Asian countries. It has also maintained a policy of strategic ambiguity, which involves its "no first use" nuclear policy and its neutral stance on the Russo-Ukrainian War.

India is a member of several intergovernmental organisations, such as the United Nations, the Asian Development Bank, BRICS, and the G-20, which is widely considered the main economic locus of emerging and developed nations. India exerts a salient influence as the founding member of the Non-Aligned Movement. India has also played an important and influential role in other international organisations, such as the East Asia Summit, World Trade Organization, International Monetary Fund (IMF), G8+5 and IBSA Dialogue Forum. India is also a member of the Asian Infrastructure Investment Bank and the Shanghai Cooperation Organisation. As a former British colony, India is a member of the Commonwealth of Nations and continues to maintain relationships with other Commonwealth countries.

== History ==
India's relations with the world have evolved since the British Raj (1857–1947), when the British Empire took responsibility for handling external and defence relations. When India gained independence in 1947, few Indians had experience in making or conducting foreign policy. However, the country's oldest political party, the Indian National Congress, had established a small foreign department in 1925 to make overseas contacts and to publicise its independence struggle. From the late 1920s on, Jawaharlal Nehru, who had a long-standing interest in world affairs among independence leaders, formulated the Congress's stance on international issues in tandem with V. K. Krishna Menon; after 1947, they articulated India's worldview as Prime Minister and de facto Foreign Minister.

India's international influence varied over the years after independence. Indian prestige and moral authority were high in the 1950s and facilitated the acquisition of developmental assistance from both East and West. Although the prestige stemmed from India's nonaligned stance, and in particular the position it placed Indian diplomats, like Menon, to mediate or conciliate in others' disputes, the nation was unable to prevent Cold War politics from becoming intertwined with interstate relations in South Asia. On the intensely debated Kashmir issue with Pakistan, India lost credibility by rejecting United Nations' calls for a plebiscite in the disputed area.

In the 1960s and 1970s, India's international position among developed and developing countries faded during wars with China and Pakistan, disputes with other countries in South Asia, and India's attempt to match Pakistan's support from the United States and China by signing the Indo-Soviet Treaty of Friendship and Cooperation in August 1971. Although India obtained substantial Soviet military and economic aid, which helped to strengthen the nation, India's influence was undercut regionally and internationally by the perception that its friendship with the Soviet Union prevented a more forthright condemnation of the Soviet presence in Afghanistan. In the late 1980s, India improved relations with the United States, other developed countries, and China while continuing close ties with the Soviet Union. Relations with its South Asian neighbours, especially Pakistan, Sri Lanka, and Nepal, occupied much of the energies of the Ministry of External Affairs.

Even before independence, the Indian colonial government maintained semi-autonomous diplomatic relations. It had colonies (such as the Aden Settlement), that sent and received full missions. India was a founder member of both the League of Nations and the United Nations. After India gained independence from the United Kingdom in 1947, it soon joined the Commonwealth of Nations and strongly supported independence movements in other colonies, like the Indonesian National Revolution. The partition and various territorial disputes, particularly that over Kashmir, would strain its relations with Pakistan for years to come. During the Cold War, India adopted a foreign policy of not aligning itself with any major power bloc. However, India developed close ties with the Soviet Union and received extensive military support from it.

=== Post-Cold War ===
The end of the Cold War significantly affected India's foreign policy, as it did for much of the world. The country now seeks to strengthen its diplomatic and economic ties with the United States, the European Union trading bloc, Japan, Israel, Mexico, and Brazil. India has also forged close ties with the member states of the Association of Southeast Asian Nations, the African Union, the Arab League and Iran.

Though India continues to have a military relationship with Russia, Israel has emerged as India's second-largest military partner while India has built a strong strategic partnership with the United States. The foreign policy of Narendra Modi indicated a shift towards focusing on the Asian region and, more broadly, trade deals.

== Policy ==
India's foreign policy has always regarded the concept of neighborhood as one of widening concentric circles, around a central axis of historical and cultural commonalities. As many as 44 million people of Indian origin live and work abroad and constitute an important link with the mother country. An important role of India's foreign policy has been to ensure their welfare and well-being within the framework of the laws of the country where they live.

=== Role of the Prime Minister ===
Jawaharlal Nehru, India's first Prime Minister, promoted a strong personal role for the Prime Minister. Nehru served concurrently as Prime Minister and Minister of External Affairs; he made all major foreign policy decisions himself after consulting with his advisers and then entrusted the conduct of international affairs to senior members of the Indian Foreign Service. He was the main founding father of the Panchsheel or the Five Principles of Peaceful Co-existence. His successors continued to exercise considerable control over India's international dealings, although they appointed separate ministers of external affairs.

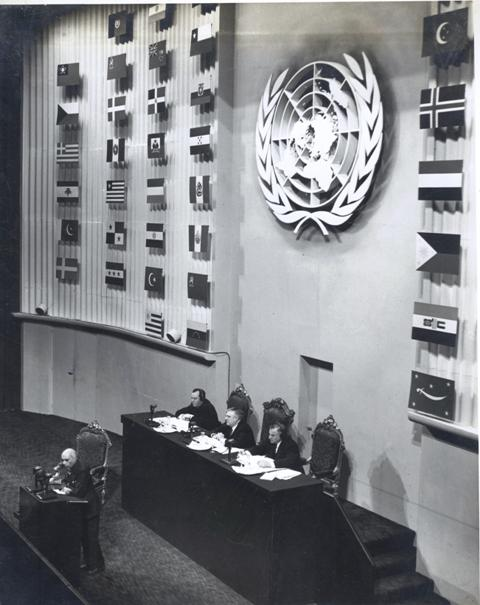
Jawaharlal Nehru, the 1st Prime Minister of India, addressing the United Nations (1948)

India's second prime minister, Lal Bahadur Shastri (1964–66), expanded the Prime Minister's Office (sometimes called the Prime Minister's Secretariat) and enlarged its powers. By the 1970s, the Office of the Prime Minister had become the de facto coordinator and supra-ministry of the Indian government. The enhanced role of the office strengthened the prime minister's control over foreign policymaking at the expense of the Ministry of External Affairs. Advisers in the office provided channels of information and policy recommendations in addition to those offered by the Ministry of External Affairs. A subordinate part of the office—the Research and Analysis Wing (RAW)—functioned in ways that significantly expanded the information available to the prime minister and his advisers. The RAW gathered intelligence, provided intelligence analysis to the Office of the Prime Minister, and conducted covert operations abroad.

The prime minister's control and reliance on personal advisers in the Office of the Prime Minister was particularly strong under the tenures of Indira Gandhi (1966–77 and 1980–84) and her son, Rajiv (1984–89), who succeeded her, and weaker during the periods of coalition governments. Observers find it difficult to determine whether the locus of decision-making authority on any issue lies with the Ministry of External Affairs, the Council of Ministers, the Office of the Prime Minister, or the prime minister himself.

The Prime Minister is, however, free to appoint advisers and special committees to examine various foreign policy options and areas of interest. In a recent instance, Manmohan Singh appointed K. Subrahmanyam in 2005 to head a special government task force to study 'Global Strategic Developments' over the next decade. The Task Force submitted its conclusions to the Prime Minister in 2006. The report has not yet been released in the public domain.

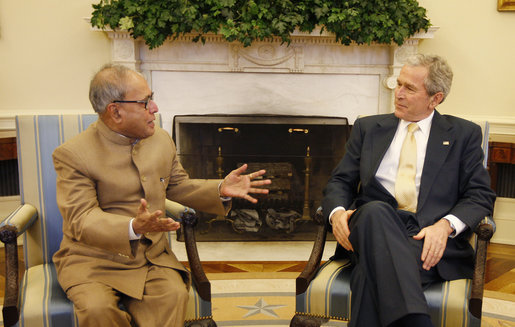
Pranab Mukherjee, the former Finance Minister of India and former President of India with former US President George W. Bush in 2008.

India's historical inclination towards a "non-aligned" foreign policy has witnessed a shift under Prime Minister Narendra Modi's leadership since 2014, as New Delhi has displayed a heightened level of "assertiveness" in its international engagements.

=== Ministry of External Affairs ===
The Ministry of External Affairs is the Indian government's agency responsible for the foreign relations of India. The Minister of External Affairs holds cabinet rank as a member of the Council of Ministers. Subrahmanyam Jaishankar is the current Minister of External Affairs.

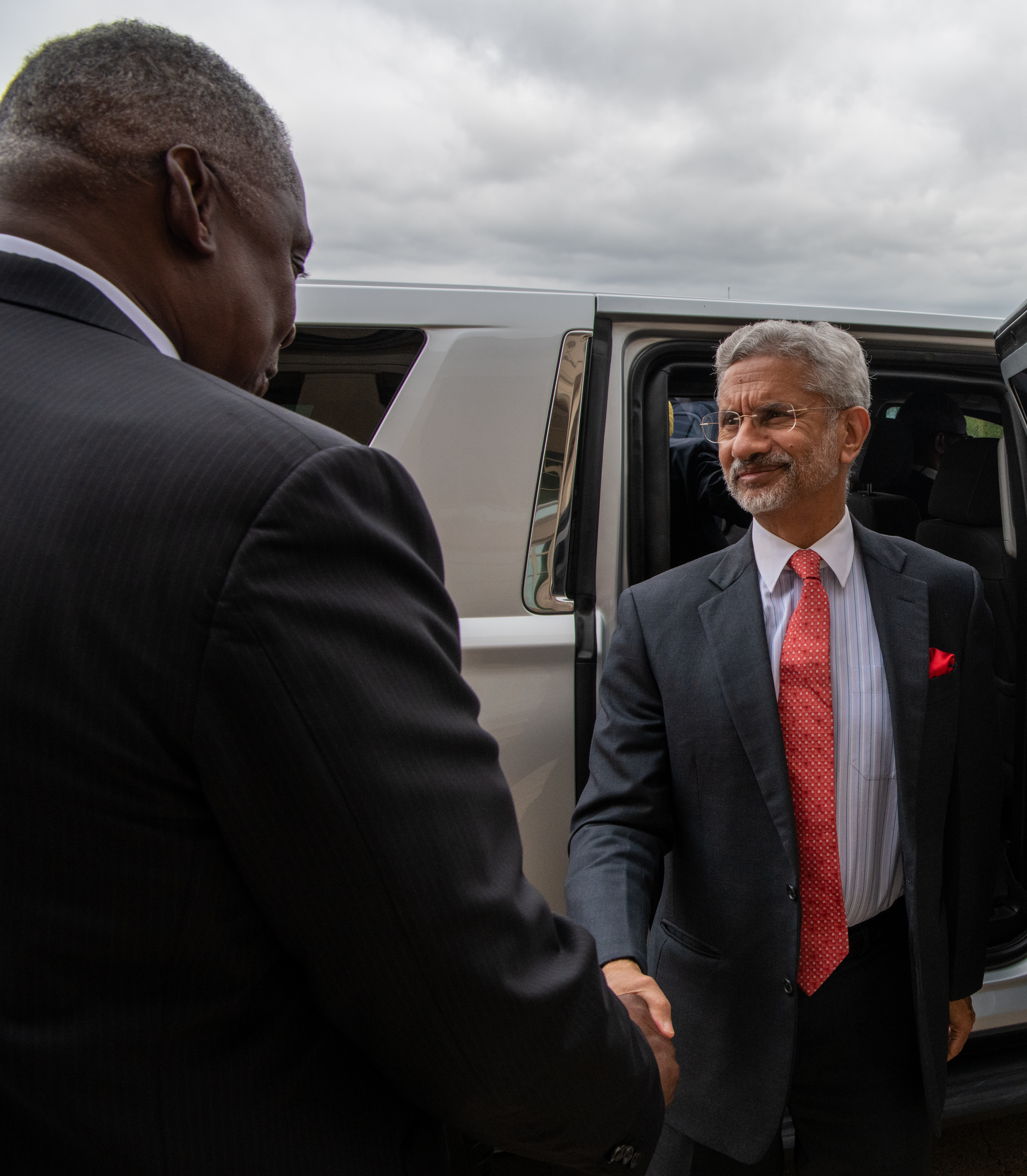
Indian External Affairs Minister Dr. S. Jaishankar meeting US Secretary of Defense Lloyd Austin at the Pentagon, 29 September 2023.

The Ministry has a Minister of State V Muraleedharan. The Indian Foreign Secretary is the head of the Indian Foreign Service (IFS) and therefore serves as the head of all Indian ambassadors and high commissioners. Vinay Mohan Kwatra is the current Foreign Secretary of India.

=== Act East Policy ===
In the post-Cold War era, a significant aspect of India's foreign policy is the Look East Policy. During the Cold War, India's relations with its Southeast Asian neighbours were not strong. After the end of the Cold War, the government of India particularly realised the importance of redressing this imbalance in India's foreign policy. Consequently, the Narsimha Rao government in the early 1990s unveiled the Look East Policy. Initially, it focused on renewing political and economic contacts with the countries of East and South-East Asia.

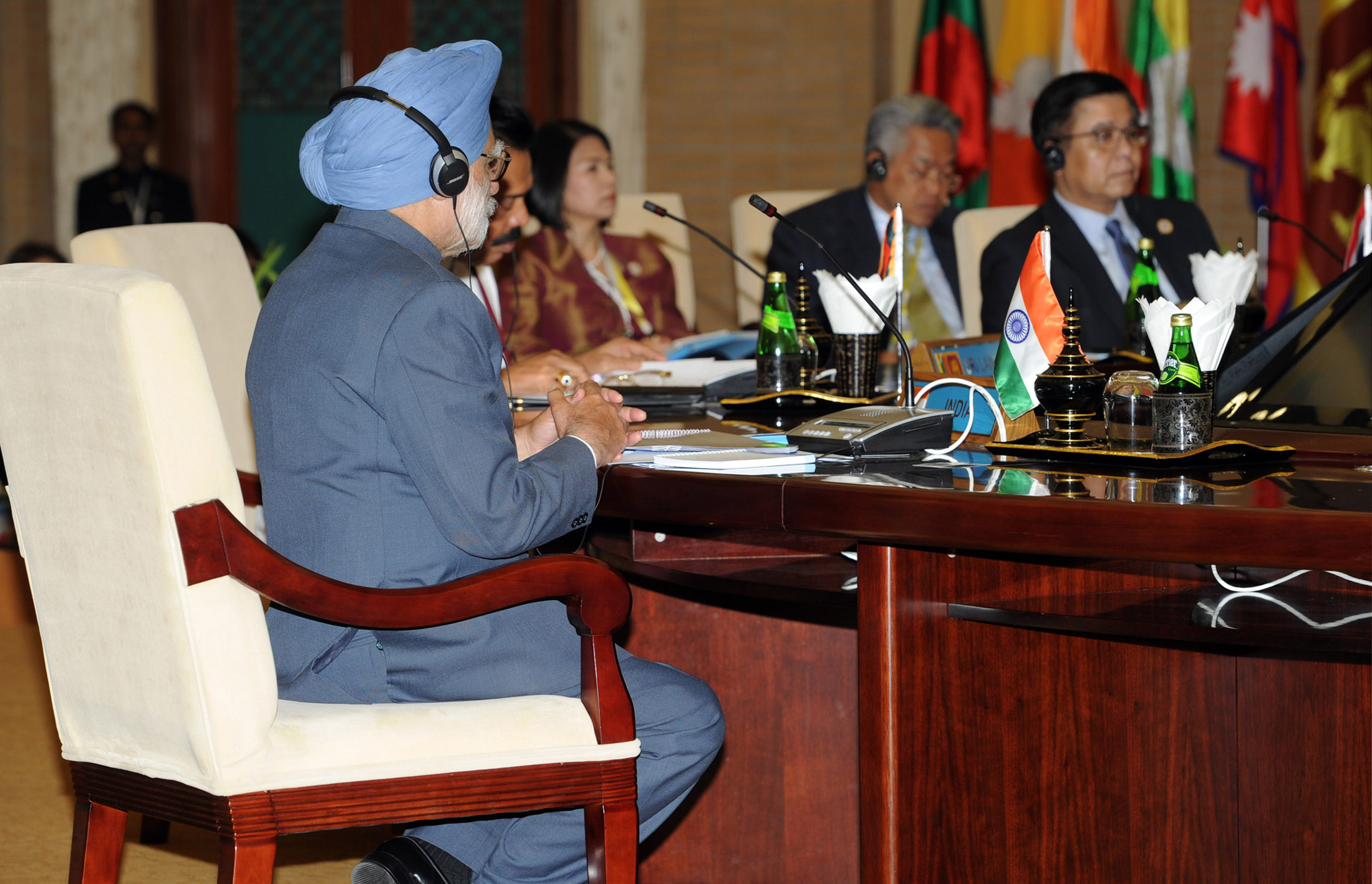
The Prime Minister, Dr. Manmohan Singh at the opening ceremony of the third Summit of the Bay of Bengal Initiative for Multi-Sectoral Technical and Economic Cooperation (BIMSTEC), at Nay Pyi Taw, Myanmar on 4 March 2014

At present, under the Look East Policy, the Government of India is giving special emphasis on the economic development of the backward northeastern region of India taking advantage of a huge market of ASEAN as well as of the energy resources available in some of the member countries of ASEAN like Burma. The look-east policy was launched in 1991 just after the end of the cold war, following the dissolution of the Soviet Union. After the start of liberalisation, it was a very strategic policy decision taken by the government in foreign policy. To quote Prime Minister Manmohan Singh, "it was also a strategic shift in India's vision of the world and India's place in the evolving global economy".

The policy was given an initial thrust with the then Prime Minister Narasimha Rao visiting China, Japan, South Korea, Vietnam and Singapore and India becoming an important dialogue partner with ASEAN in 1992. Since the beginning of this century, India has given a big push to this policy by becoming a summit-level partner of ASEAN (2002) and getting involved in some regional initiatives such as the BIMSTEC and the Ganga–Mekong Cooperation and now becoming a member of the East Asia Summit (EAS) in December 2005.

=== Ties with Western nations ===
The President of India, Smt. Droupadi Murmu accorded a ceremonial welcome of the President of the Federative Republic of Brazil, Mr. Luiz Inácio Lula da Silva at Rashtrapati Bhavan, in New Delhi on February 21, 2026.

Since the dissolution of the Soviet Union, India has forged a closer partnership with Western powers. In the 1990s, India's economic problems and the demise of the bipolar world political system forced India to reassess its foreign policy and adjust its foreign relations. Previous policies proved inadequate to cope with the serious domestic and international problems facing India. The end of the Cold War gutted the core meaning of nonalignment and left Indian foreign policy without significant direction. The hard, pragmatic considerations of the early 1990s were still viewed within the nonaligned framework of the past, but the disintegration of the Soviet Union removed much of India's international leverage, for which relations with Russia and the other post-Soviet states could not compensate. After the dissolution of the Soviet Union, India improved its relations with the United States, Canada, France, Japan, and Germany. In 1992, India established formal diplomatic relations with Israel, and this relationship grew during the tenures of the National Democratic Alliance (NDA) government and the subsequent United Progressive Alliance (UPA) governments.

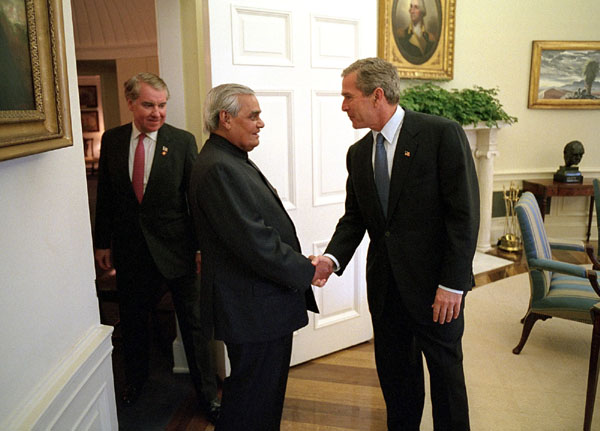
President George W. Bush welcomes Prime Minister Vajpayee of India to the Oval Office Friday, November 9 2001.

In the mid-1990s, India attracted the world's attention to Pakistan-backed terrorism in Kashmir. The Kargil War resulted in a major diplomatic victory for India. The United States and European Union recognised the fact that the Pakistani military had illegally infiltrated Indian territory and pressured Pakistan to withdraw from Kargil. Several anti-India militant groups based in Pakistan were labelled as terrorist groups by the United States and European Union. In 1998, India tested nuclear weapons for the second time (see Pokhran-II) which resulted in several US, Japanese and European sanctions on India. India's then defence minister, George Fernandes, said that India's nuclear programme was necessary as it provided a deterrence to a potential Chinese nuclear threat. Most of the sanctions imposed on India were removed by 2001.

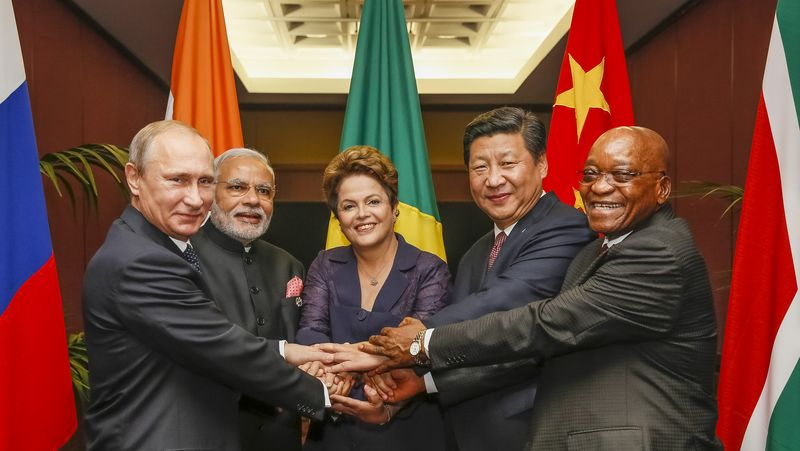
India has often represented the interests of developing countries on various international platforms. Shown here are Vladimir Putin, Narendra Modi, Dilma Rousseff, Xi Jinping, and Jacob Zuma, 2014.

After September 11 attacks in 2001, Indian intelligence agencies provided the US with significant information on Al-Qaeda and related groups' activities in Pakistan and Afghanistan. India's extensive contribution to the war on terror, coupled with a surge in its economy, has helped India's diplomatic relations with several countries. Over the past three years, India has held numerous joint military exercises with the US and European nations that have resulted in a strengthened US-India and EU-India bilateral relationship. India's bilateral trade with Europe and the United States has more than doubled in the five years since 2003.

India has been pushing for reforms in the UN and WTO with mixed results. India's candidature for a permanent seat at the UN Security Council is currently backed by several countries, including France, Russia, the United Kingdom, Germany, Japan, Brazil, Australia and UAE. In 2004, the United States signed a nuclear cooperation agreement with India even though the latter is not a part of the Nuclear Non-Proliferation Treaty. The US argued that India's strong nuclear non-proliferation record made it an exception; however, this has not persuaded other Nuclear Suppliers Group members to sign similar deals with India. During a state visit to India in November 2010, US President Barack Obama announced US support for India's bid for permanent membership to UN Security Council as well as India's entry to Nuclear Suppliers Group, Wassenaar Arrangement, Australia Group and Missile Technology Control Regime. As of January 2018, India has become a member of Wassenaar Arrangement, Australia Group and Missile Technology Control Regime.

Moneycontrol reported that 858,500 tonnes of LNG from the US has been imported by India in August and upto 18.6% from 723,800 tonnes in July. Following the Iran conflict, in September 2026, the US and Nigeria have cut off imports from Qatar due to the blockade in the Strait of Hormuz.

== Strategic partners ==
India's growing economy, strategic location, a mix of friendly and diplomatic foreign policy and large and vibrant diaspora has won it more allies than enemies. India has friendly relations with several countries in the developing world. Though India is not a part of any major military alliance, it has a close strategic and military relationship with most of its fellow major powers.

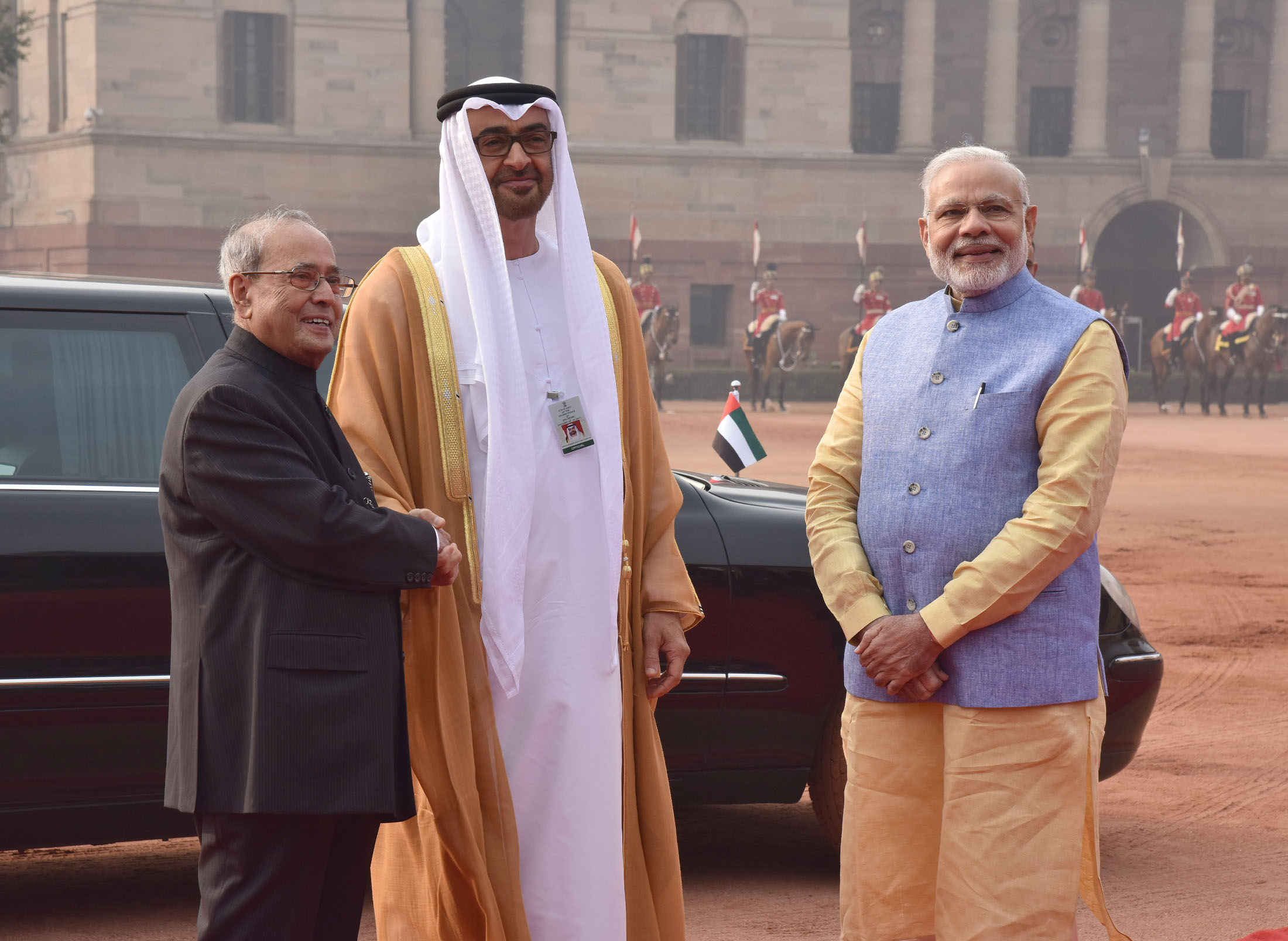
The Crown Prince of Abu Dhabi, Deputy Supreme Commander of U.A.E. Armed Forces, General Sheikh Mohammed Bin Zayed Al Nahyan being received by the President, Shri Pranab Mukherjee and the Prime Minister, Shri Narendra Modi

Countries considered India's closest include the United Arab Emirates, Russian Federation, Israel, Afghanistan, France, Bhutan, Bangladesh, and the United States. Russia is the largest supplier of military equipment to India, followed by Israel and France. According to some analysts, Israel is set to overtake Russia as India's largest military and strategic partner. The two countries also collaborate extensively in the sphere of counter-terrorism and space technology. India also enjoys strong military relations with several other countries, including the United Kingdom, the United States, Japan, Singapore, Brazil, South Africa and Italy. In addition, India operates an airbase in Tajikistan, signed a landmark defence accord with Qatar in 2008, and has leased out Assumption Island from Seychelles to build a naval base in 2015.

Prime Minister Narendra Modi with President Vladimir Putin and Xi Jinping at the 18th BRICS Summit in Bharat Mandapam on September 12, 2026.

India has also forged relationships with developing countries, especially South Africa, Brazil, and Mexico. These countries often represent the interests of developing countries through economic forums such as the G8+5, IBSA and WTO. India was seen as one of the standard bearers of the developing world and claimed to speak for a collection of more than 30 other developing nations at the Doha Development Round. Indian Look East policy has helped it develop greater economic and strategic partnerships with Southeast Asian countries, South Korea, Japan, and Taiwan. India also enjoys friendly relations with the Persian Gulf countries and most members of the African Union.

The Foundation for National Security Research in New Delhi published India's Strategic Partners: A Comparative Assessment and ranked India's top strategic partners with a score out of 90 points: Russia comes out on top with 62, followed by the United States (58), France (51), UK (41), Germany (37), and Japan (34). One of the outcomes of the 2023 G20 summit is a transportation project that would facilitate Indian trade to the Middle East and Europe.

=== Partnership agreements ===
India has signed strategic partnership agreements with over 40 countries/supranational entities listed here in the chronological order of the pacts:

Agreements
S.no.	Country	Year of Agreement signed	Image	S.no.	Country	Year of Agreement signed	Image
1	France	1997		26	Bangladesh	2015	
2	Russia	2000		27	Singapore	2015	
3	Germany	2001		28	United Arab Emirates	2015	
4	Mauritius	2003		29	Rwanda	2017	
5	Iran	2003		30	Israel	2017	
6	United Kingdom	2004		31	Argentina	2019	
7	United States	2004		32	Denmark	2020	
8	European Union	2004		33	Netherlands	2021	
9	Indonesia	2005		34	Egypt	2023	
10	China	2005		35	Tanzania	2023	
11	Brazil	2006		36	Italy	2023	
12	Vietnam	2007		37	Greece	2023	
13	Oman	2008		38	Poland	2024	
14	Kazakhstan	2009		39	Brunei	2024	
15	Australia	2009		40	Kuwait	2024	
16	Malaysia	2010		41	Qatar	2025	
17	South Korea	2010		42	Philippines	2025	
18	Saudi Arabia	2010		43	Thailand	2025	
19	Uzbekistan	2011		44	Sweden	2026	
20	Afghanistan	2011		45	Cyprus	2026	
21	Tajikistan	2012					
22	ASEAN	2012					
23	Japan	2014					
24	Seychelles	2014					
25	Mongolia	2015					

=== Future agreements ===
As of 2025, India is currently taking steps towards establishing strategic partnerships with Canada and Colombia. Although India has not signed any formal strategic partnership agreement with Bhutan, its foreign ministry often describes relations with Bhutan as 'strategic'.

== Diplomatic relations ==
List of countries with which India maintains diplomatic relations:

#	Country	Date
1	Australia	1 November 1943
2	Canada	6 April 1945
3	United States	1 November 1946
4	United Kingdom	November 1946
5	Italy	2 March 1947
6	Russia	14 April 1947
7	Netherlands	17 April 1947
8	Nepal	13 June 1947
9	Thailand	1 August 1947
10	France	15 August 1947
11	Norway	15 August 1947
12	Pakistan	15 August 1947
13	Saudi Arabia	15 August 1947
14	Turkey	15 August 1947
15	Egypt	18 August 1947
16	Belgium	20 September 1947
17	Czech Republic	18 November 1947
18	Afghanistan	10 December 1947
19	Myanmar	4 January 1948
20	Brazil	6 April 1948
—	Holy See	12 June 1948
21	Sweden	22 June 1948
22	Ethiopia	1 July 1948
23	Luxembourg	1 July 1948
24	Portugal	12 August 1948
25	Switzerland	14 August 1948
26	Lebanon	15 September 1948
27	Sri Lanka	11 October 1948
28	Uruguay	5 November 1948
29	Hungary	18 November 1948
30	Serbia	5 December 1948
31	Romania	14 December 1948
32	Ireland	10 January 1949
33	Argentina	3 February 1949
34	Chile	6 April 1949
35	Indonesia	16 April 1949
36	Denmark	10 September 1949
37	Finland	10 September 1949
38	Austria	10 November 1949
39	Philippines	26 November 1949
40	Jordan	27 January 1950
41	Iran	15 March 1950
42	China	1 April 1950
43	Syria	6 June 1950
44	Mexico	1 August 1950
45	Germany	7 March 1951
46	New Zealand	7 April 1952
47	Japan	28 April 1952
48	Cambodia	30 May 1952
49	Libya	20 July 1952
50	Iraq	10 November 1952
51	Poland	30 March 1954
52	Bulgaria	22 December 1954
53	Mongolia	24 December 1955
54	Laos	2 February 1956
55	Albania	3 March 1956
56	Sudan	7 May 1956
57	Greece	14 May 1956
58	Spain	7 November 1956
59	Morocco	14 January 1957
60	Ghana	6 March 1957
61	Malaysia	31 August 1957
62	Tunisia	2 April 1958
63	Bolivia	17 December 1958
64	Colombia	19 January 1959
65	Venezuela	1 November 1959
66	Cuba	12 January 1960
67	Madagascar	25 June 1960
68	Liberia	7 July 1960
69	Guinea	8 July 1960
70	Democratic Republic of the Congo	August 1960
71	Nigeria	1 October 1960
72	Somalia	10 March 1961
73	Senegal	2 April 1961
74	Sierra Leone	28 April 1961
75	Paraguay	13 September 1961
76	Ivory Coast	5 November 1961
77	Tanzania	9 December 1961
78	Mali	24 January 1962
79	Cyprus	10 February 1962
80	Yemen	15 March 1962
81	Burkina Faso	23 March 1962
82	Kuwait	26 March 1962
83	Panama	1 July 1962
84	Algeria	2 July 1962
85	Jamaica	12 August 1962
86	Togo	31 August 1962
87	Trinidad and Tobago	31 August 1962
88	Uganda	9 October 1962
89	Peru	25 March 1963
90	Cameroon	4 April 1963
91	Benin	25 June 1963
92	Kenya	14 December 1963
93	Malawi	19 October 1964
94	Malta	10 March 1965
95	Zambia	April 1965
96	Gambia	25 June 1965
97	Singapore	24 August 1965
98	Mauritania	22 October 1965
99	Maldives	1 November 1965
100	Guyana	26 May 1966
101	Gabon	16 July 1966
102	Barbados	30 November 1966
103	Republic of the Congo	26 August 1967
104	Burundi	1967
105	Rwanda	1967
106	Bhutan	14 January 1968
107	Mauritius	12 March 1968
108	Equatorial Guinea	1968
109	Ecuador	November 1969
110	Samoa	June 1970
111	Costa Rica	15 September 1970
112	Fiji	10 October 1970
113	Tonga	23 December 1970
114	Lesotho	8 June 1971
115	Oman	25 July 1971
116	Bahrain	12 October 1971
117	Eswatini	5 November 1971
118	Bangladesh	6 December 1971
119	United Arab Emirates	6 January 1972
120	Vietnam	7 January 1972
121	Qatar	12 April 1972
122	Iceland	11 May 1972
123	Guatemala	16 May 1972
124	Nicaragua	25 October 1972
125	Botswana	5 December 1972
126	North Korea	10 December 1973
127	South Korea	10 December 1973
128	Guinea-Bissau	8 September 1974
129	Mozambique	25 June 1975
130	Nauru	12 September 1975
131	Grenada	1 October 1975
132	Bahamas	16 October 1975
133	Chad	18 October 1975
134	São Tomé and Príncipe	1975
135	Suriname	23 January 1976
136	Papua New Guinea	19 May 1976
137	Central African Republic	7 June 1976
138	Seychelles	29 June 1976
139	Comoros	June 1976
140	Cape Verde	6 June 1977
141	Niger	18 July 1977
142	El Salvador	12 February 1979
143	Angola	2 June 1979
144	Djibouti	24 December 1979
145	Zimbabwe	18 April 1980
146	Dominica	8 January 1981
147	Saint Vincent and the Grenadines	20 April 1981
148	Saint Lucia	8 February 1982
149	Antigua and Barbuda	2 April 1982
150	Vanuatu	13 April 1982
151	Belize	28 March 1983
152	Saint Kitts and Nevis	22 December 1983
153	Brunei	10 May 1984
154	Kiribati	7 August 1985
155	Tuvalu	13 August 1986
156	Solomon Islands	1 May 1987
—	State of Palestine	16 November 1989
157	Namibia	21 March 1990
158	Estonia	2 December 1991
159	Latvia	20 December 1991
160	Ukraine	17 January 1992
161	Israel	21 January 1992
162	Kazakhstan	22 February 1992
163	Lithuania	25 February 1992
164	Azerbaijan	28 February 1992
165	Kyrgyzstan	18 March 1992
166	Uzbekistan	18 March 1992
167	Moldova	20 March 1992
168	Belarus	17 April 1992
169	Turkmenistan	20 April 1992
170	Slovenia	18 May 1992
171	Croatia	9 July 1992
172	Bosnia and Herzegovina	10 August 1992
173	Tajikistan	28 August 1992
174	Armenia	31 August 1992
175	Georgia	28 September 1992
176	Slovakia	1 January 1993
177	Liechtenstein	6 April 1993
178	Eritrea	17 September 1993
179	South Africa	22 November 1993
180	Honduras	28 September 1994
181	Andorra	22 November 1994
182	Palau	10 April 1995
183	North Macedonia	9 February 1995
184	Haiti	27 September 1996
185	Federated States of Micronesia	29 November 1996
186	Marshall Islands	2 February 1997
—	Cook Islands	May 1998
187	Dominican Republic	4 May 1999
188	Timor-Leste	24 January 2003
189	Montenegro	2 August 2006
190	Monaco	21 September 2007
191	San Marino	26 September 2011
192	South Sudan	13 March 2012
—	Niue	30 August 2012

== Africa ==
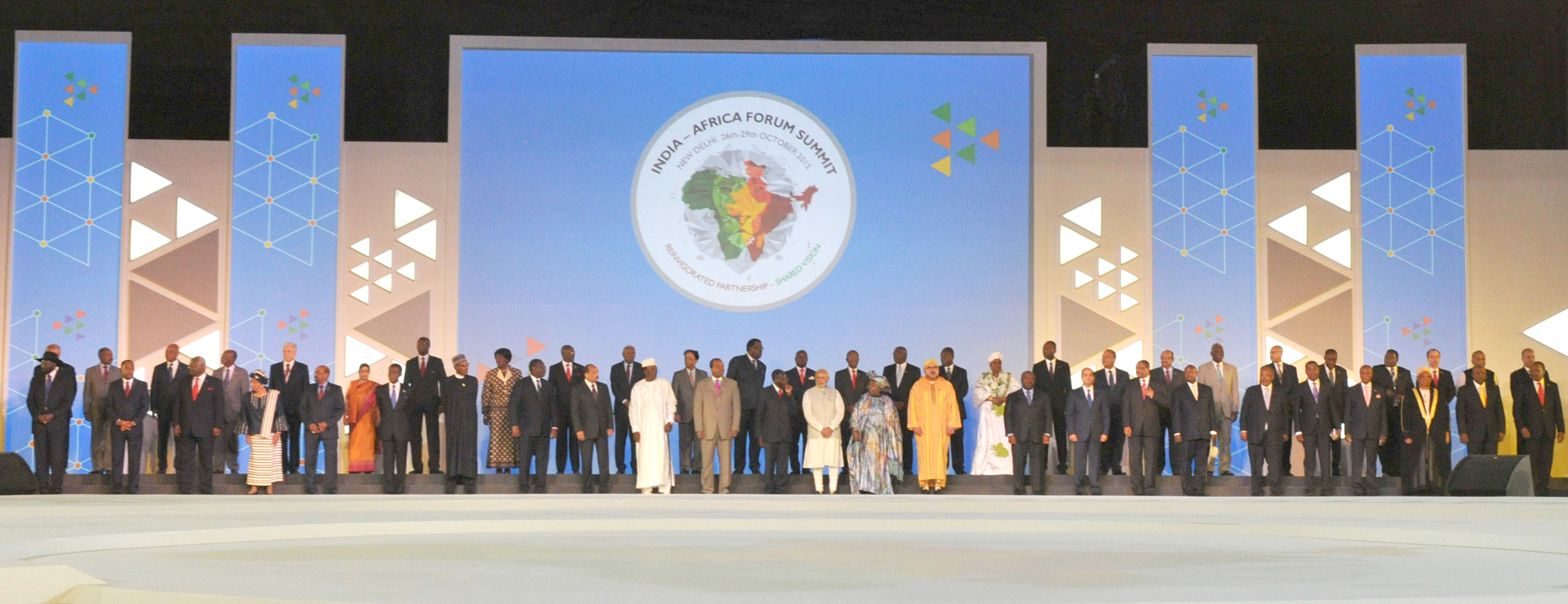
PM Narendra Modi and the Leaders of African nations in the Family Photograph, at the inaugural ceremony of the 3rd India Africa Forum Summit 2015, in New Delhi on October 29, 2015.

India admitted the African Union as a permanent member of the G20 during the 2023 G20 New Delhi summit, making it the 21st member of the group.

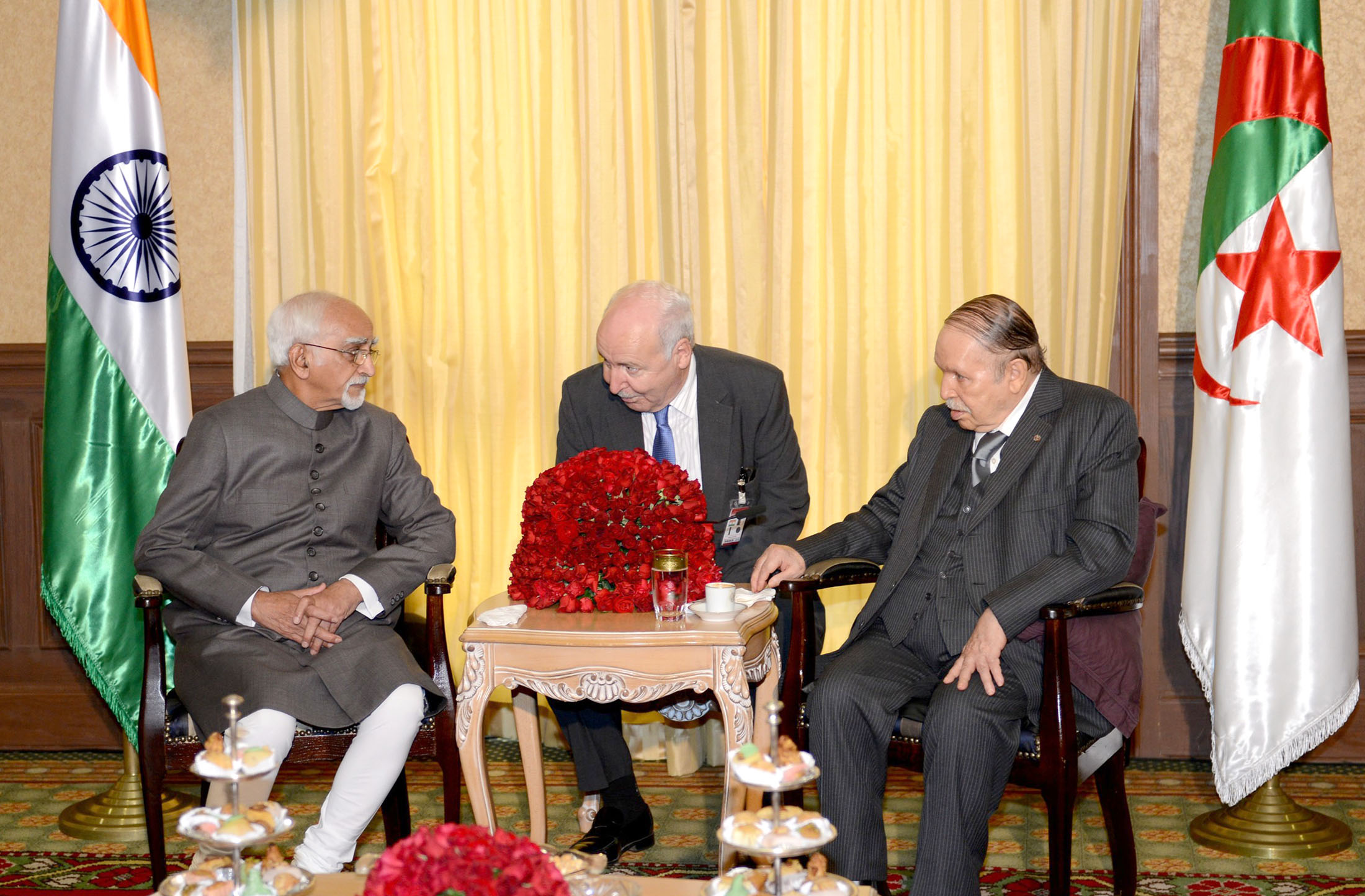
The Vice-president, Shri M. Hamid Ansari calling on the President of Algeria, Mr. Abdelaziz Bouteflika, in Algiers, Algeria on 19 October 2016

Algeria

Burkina Faso

Both countries established diplomatic relations on 24 March 1962

Burundi

- Burundi has an embassy in New Delhi.
- India is represented in Burundi by its embassy in Kampala, Uganda.
- Both countries have several bilateral agreements.

Chad

Both countries established diplomatic relations on 18 October 1975

Comoros

- Both countries established diplomatic relations in June 1976.
- Both countries are full members of the Indian-Ocean Rim Association.

Congo

PM Modi with the Ethiopian Prime Minister, Dr. Abiy Ahmed Ali at Ethiopian National Palace, in Addis Ababa, Ethiopia on December 16, 2025.

Both countries established diplomatic relations on 26 August 1967.

DR Congo

Djibouti

Both countries established diplomatic relations on 7 December 1981.

Ethiopia

Both countries established diplomatic relations on 1 July 1948.

India and Ethiopia have warm bilateral ties based on cooperation and support. India has been a partner in Ethiopia's developmental efforts, training Ethiopian personnel under its ITEC programme, providing it with several lines of credit and launching the Pan-African e-Network project there in 2007. The Second India–Africa Forum Summit was held in Addis Ababa in 2011. India is also Ethiopia's second-largest source of foreign direct investments.

Egypt

Both countries established diplomatic relations on 18 August 1947.

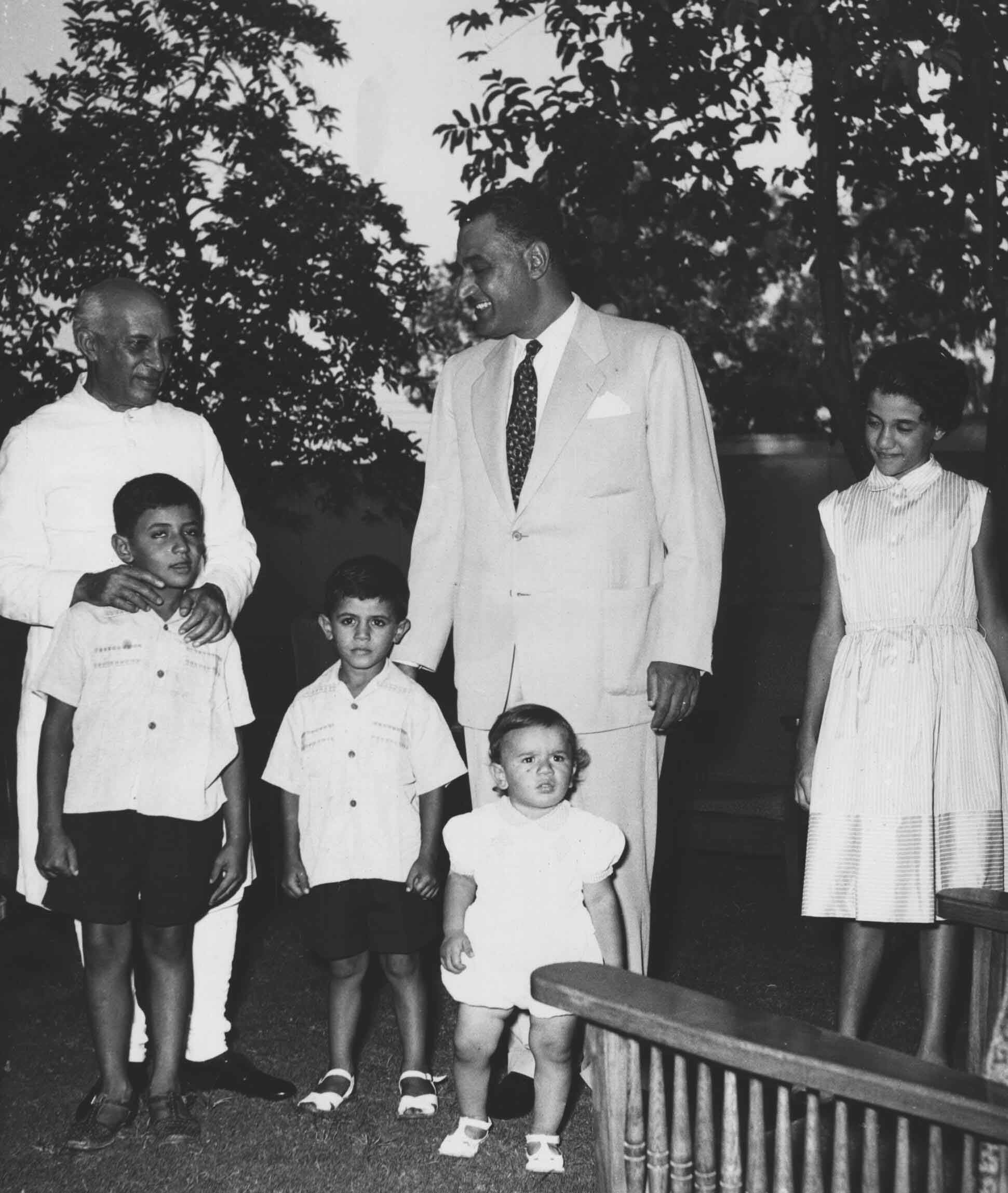
Abdel Nasser and his children with Jawaharlal Nehru. In 1955, Egypt under Gamal Abdel Nasser and India under Jawaharlal Nehru became the founders of the Non-Aligned Movement. During the 1956 War, Nehru stood in support of Egypt to the point of threatening to withdraw his country from the Commonwealth of Nations.

Prime Minister Narendra Modi and President of Egypt Abdel Fattah el-Sisi holding the signed Strategic Partnership MoU in Cairo, Egypt, on 25 June 2023.

Modern Egypt-India relations go back to the contacts between Saad Zaghloul and Mohandas Gandhi on the common goals of their respective movements of independence. In 1955, Egypt under Gamal Abdul Nasser and India under Jawaharlal Nehru became the founders of the Non-Aligned Movement. During the 1956 War, Nehru supported Egypt to the point of threatening to withdraw his country from the Commonwealth of Nations. In 1967, following the Arab–Israeli conflict, India supported Egypt and the Arabs. In 1977, New Delhi described the visit of President Anwar al-Sadat to Jerusalem as a "brave" move and considered the peace treaty between Egypt and Israel a primary step on the path of a just settlement of the Middle East problem. Major Egyptian exports to India include raw cotton, raw and manufactured fertilisers, oil and oil products, organic and non-organic chemicals, and leather and iron products. Major imports into Egypt from India are cotton yarn, sesame, coffee, herbs, tobacco, lentils, pharmaceutical products and transport equipment. The Egyptian Ministry of Petroleum is also currently negotiating the establishment of a natural gas-operated fertiliser plant with another Indian company. In 2004 the Gas Authority of India Limited bought 15% of Egypt's Nat Gas distribution and marketing company. In 2008 Egyptian investment in India was worth some 750 million dollars, according to the Egyptian ambassador. After the Arab Spring of 2011, with ousting of Hosni Mubarak, Egypt asked for the help of India in conducting nationwide elections.

Gabon

Gabon maintains an embassy in New Delhi. The Embassy of India in Kinshasa, Democratic Republic of Congo is jointly accredited to Gabon.

Ghana

Both countries established diplomatic relations on 6 March 1957.

PM Modi met the President of the Republic of Ghana, Mr. John Dramani Mahama ahead of their bilateral meeting at Jubilee House in Accra, Ghana on July 02, 2025.

Relations between Ghana and India are generally close and cordial, mixed with economic and cultural connections. Trade between India and Ghana amounted to US$818 million in 2010–11 and is expected to be worth US$1 billion by 2013. Ghana imports automobiles and buses from India and companies like Tata Motors and Ashok Leyland have a significant presence in the country. Ghanaian exports to India consist of gold, cocoa and timber while Indian exports to Ghana comprise pharmaceuticals, agricultural machinery, electrical equipment, plastics, steel and cement.

The Government of India has extended $228 million in lines of credit to Ghana which has been used for projects in sectors like agro-processing, fish processing, waste management, rural electrification and the expansion of Ghana's railways. India has also offered to set up an India-Africa Institute of Information Technology (IAIIT) and a Food Processing Business Incubation Centre in Ghana under the India–Africa Forum Summit.

India is among the largest foreign investors in Ghana's economy. At the end of 2011, Indian investments in Ghana amounted to $550 million covering some 548 projects. Indian investments are primarily in the agriculture and manufacturing sectors of Ghana, while Ghanaian companies manufacture drugs in collaboration with Indian companies. The IT sector in Ghana too has a significant Indian presence in it. India and Ghana also have a Bilateral Investment Protection Agreement between them. India's Rashtriya Chemicals and Fertilisers is in the process of setting up a fertiliser plant in Ghana at Nyankrom in the Shama District of the Western Region of Ghana. The project entails an investment of US$1.3 billion, and the plant would have an annual production capacity of 1.1 million tonnes, the bulk of which would be exported to India. There are also plans to develop a sugar processing plant entailing an investment of US$36 million. Bank of Baroda, Bharti Airtel, Tata Motors and Tech Mahindra are amongst the major Indian companies in Ghana.

There are about seven to eight thousand Indians and Persons of Indian Origin living in Ghana today, with some of them having been there for over 70 years. Ghana is home to a growing indigenous Hindu population that today numbers 3000 families. Hinduism first came to Ghana only in the late 1940s with the Sindhi traders who migrated here following India's Partition. It has been growing in Ghana and neighbouring Togo since the mid-1970s when an African Hindu monastery was established in Accra.

Guinea

Both countries established diplomatic relations on 8 July 1960.

Ivory Coast

The bilateral relations between India and Ivory Coast have expanded considerably in recent years as India seeks to develop an extensive commercial and strategic partnership in the West Africann region. The Indian diplomatic mission in Abidjan was opened in 1979. Ivory Coast opened its resident mission in New Delhi in September 2004. Both nations are currently fostering efforts to increase trade, investments and economic cooperation.

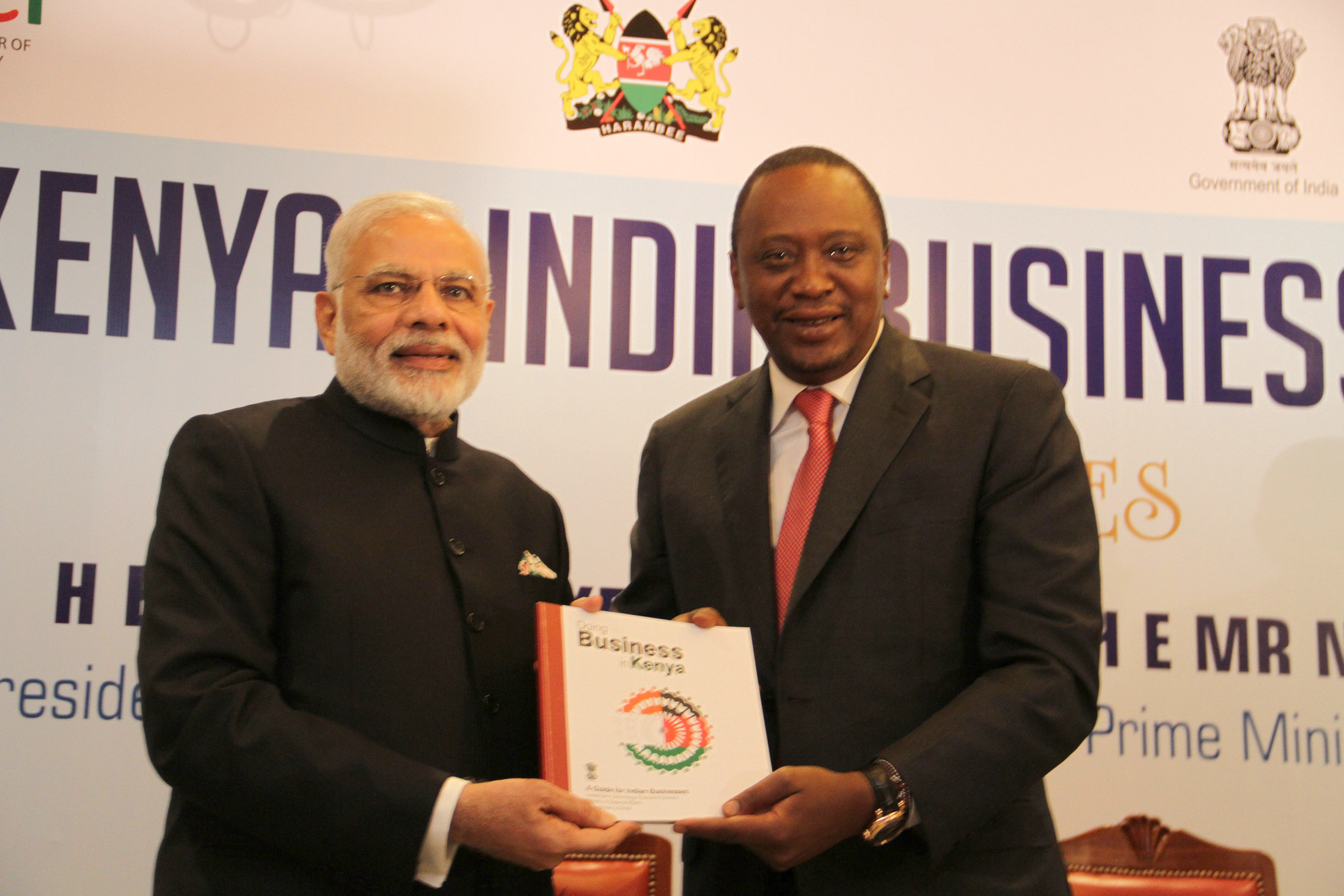
The Prime Minister, Shri Narendra Modi presenting a guide for Indian Businesses: "Doing Business in Kenya" to the President of Kenya, Mr. Uhuru Kenyatta, at the India-Kenya Business Forum, at Nairobi, Kenya on 11 July 2016.

Kenya

Both countries established diplomatic relations on 14 December 1963

As littoral states of the Indian Ocean, trade links and commercial ties between India and Kenya go back several centuries. Kenya has a large minority of Indians and Persons of Indian Origin living there who are descendants of labourers who were brought in by the British to construct the Uganda Railway and Gujarati merchants. India and Kenya have growing trade and commercial ties. Bilateral trade amounted to $2.4 billion in 2010–2011, but with Kenyan imports from India accounting for $2.3 billion, the balance of trade was heavily in India's favour. India is Kenya's sixth-largest trading partner and the largest exporter to Kenya. Indian exports to Kenya include pharmaceuticals, steel, machinery and automobiles while Kenyan exports to India are primary commodities such as soda ash, vegetables and tea. Indian companies have a significant presence in Kenya with Indian corporates like the Tata Group, Essar Group, Reliance Industries and Bharti Airtel operating there.

Lesotho

Both countries established diplomatic relations on 8 June 1971.

India operates a High Commission in Pretoria which serves Lesotho, and Lesotho operates a residential mission in India. Lesotho and India have strong ties. Lesotho has backed India's bid for a Permanent UN seat and has also recognised Jammu and Kashmir as a part of India. India exported US$11 million to Lesotho in the 2010–2011 year while only importing US$1 million in goods from Lesotho. Since 2001, an Indian Army Training Team has trained several soldiers in the LDF.

Liberia

Both countries established diplomatic relations on 7 July 1960.

The bilateral relations between the Republic of India and the Republic of Liberia have expanded through growing bilateral trade and strategic cooperation. India is represented in Liberia through its embassy in Abidjan (Ivory Coast) and an active honorary consulate in Monrovia since 1984. Liberia was represented in India through its resident mission in New Delhi, which subsequently closed due to budgetary constraints.

Libya

Both countries established diplomatic relations on 20 July 1952.

Malawi

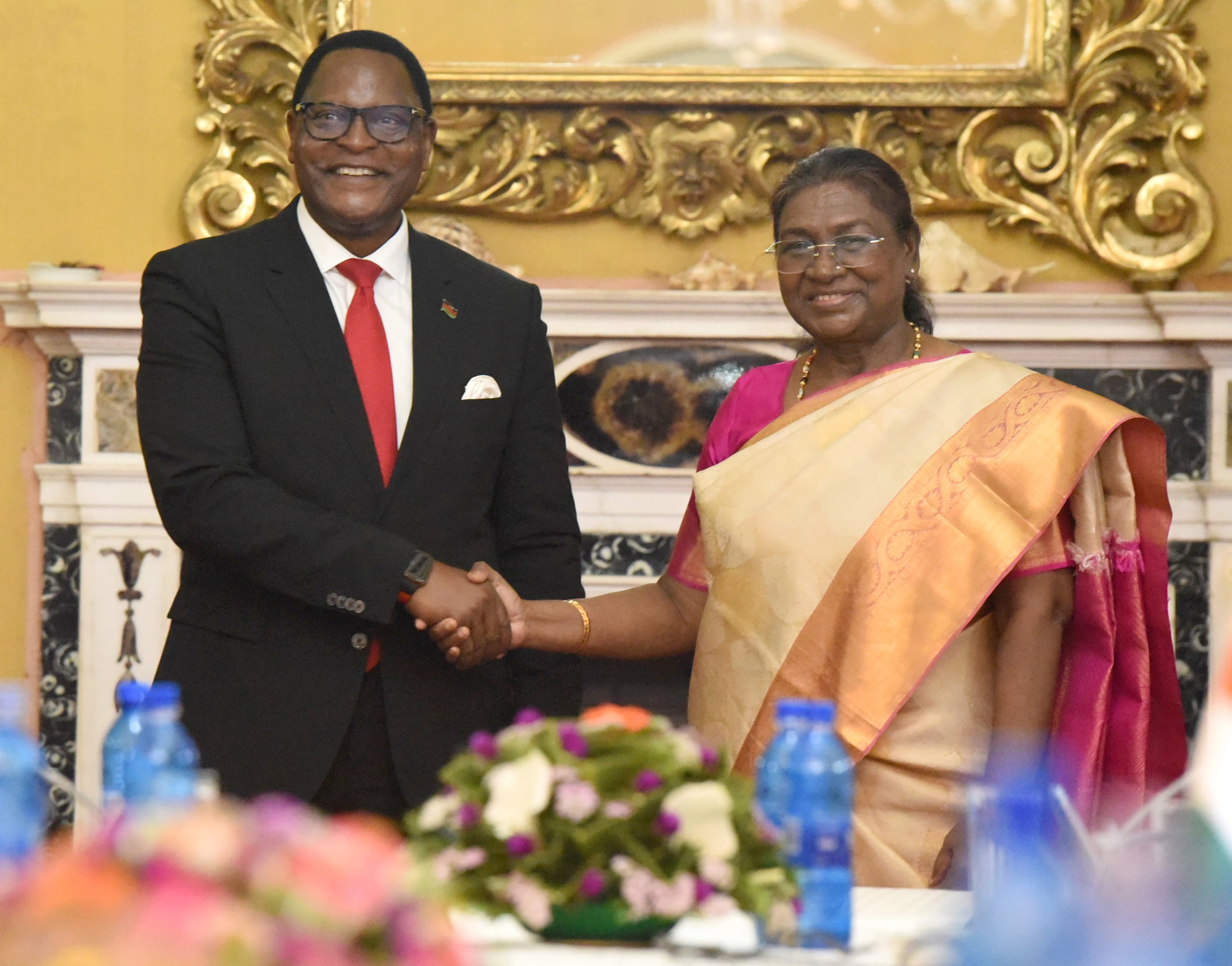
The President of India, Smt Droupadi Murmu and the President of Malawi, Dr. Lazarus Chakwera

Both countries established diplomatic relations on 19 October 1964.

Mali

Both countries established diplomatic relations on 24 January 1962.

Mauritania

Both countries established diplomatic relations on 22 October 1965.

India is represented in Mauritania by its embassy in Bamako, Mali. India also has an honorary consulate in Nouakchott.

Mauritius

Both countries established diplomatic relations on 12 March 1968.

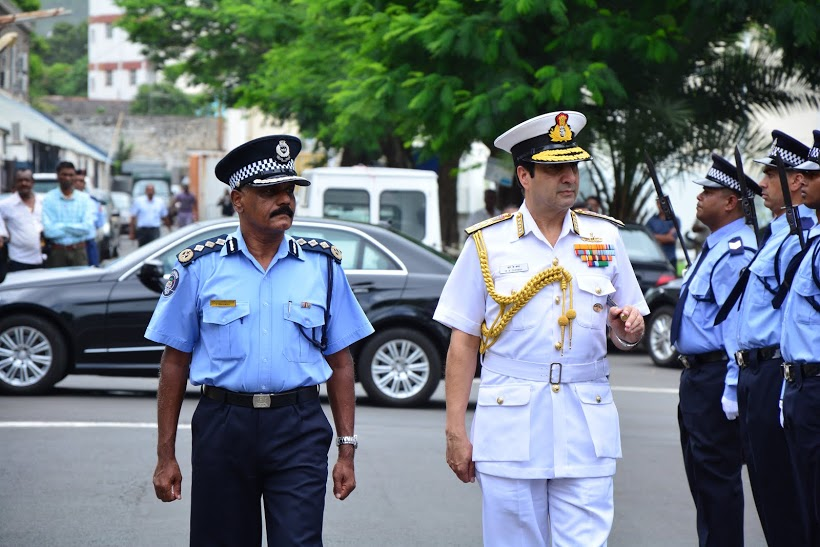
Admiral RK Dhowan inspecting guard of honour in Mauritius

The relations between India and Mauritius have existed since 1730; diplomatic relations were established in 1948 before Mauritius became an independent state.

The President of India, Smt. Droupadi Murmu meeting with the Prime Minister of Mauritius, Mr. Pravind Jugnauth in Mauritius on March 11, 2024.

Prime Minister Narendra Modi holds meeting with the Prime Minister of Mauritius, Dr. Navinchandra Ramgoolam at Port Louis, Mauritius on March 11, 2025.

The relationship is very cordial due to cultural affinities and long historical ties that exist between the two nations. More than 68% of the Mauritian population is of Indian origin, most known as Indo-Mauritian. The economic and commercial cooperation has been increasing over the years. India has become Mauritius' largest source of imports since 2007, and Mauritius imported US$816 million worth of goods in the April 2010 – March 2011 financial year. Mauritius has remained the largest source of FDI for India for more than a decade, with FDI equity inflows totalling US$55.2 billion in the period April 2000 to April 2011. India and Mauritius co-operate in combating piracy, which has emerged as a major threat in the Indian Ocean region, and support India's stand against terrorism.

The relationship between Mauritius and India dates back to the early 1730s, when artisans were brought from Puducherry and Tamil Nadu. Diplomatic relations between India and Mauritius were established in 1948. Mauritius maintained contacts with India through successive Dutch, French and British rule. From the 1820s, Indian workers started coming to Mauritius to work on sugar plantations. From 1833, when slavery was abolished by Parliament, large numbers of Indian workers began to be brought into Mauritius as indentured labourers. On 2 November 1834, the ship named 'Atlas' docked in Mauritius carrying the first batch of Indian indentured labourers.

Morocco

Morocco has an embassy in New Delhi. It also has an Honorary Consul based in Mumbai. India operates an embassy in Rabat. Both nations are part of the Non-Aligned Movement.

In the United Nations, India supported the decolonisation of Morocco and the Moroccan freedom movement. India recognised Morocco on 20 June 1956 and established relations in 1957. The Ministry of External Affairs of the Government of India states that "India and Morocco have enjoyed cordial and friendly relations and over the years bilateral relations have witnessed significant depth and growth."

The Indian Council for Cultural Relations promotes Indian culture in Morocco. Morocco seeks to increase its trade ties with India and is seeking Indian investment in various sectors The bilateral relations between India and Morocco strengthened after the Moroccan Ambassador to India spent a week in Srinagar, the capital city of Jammu and Kashmir. This showed Moroccan solidarity with India regarding Kashmir.

Mozambique

Both countries established diplomatic relations on 25 June 1975.

India has a high commissioner in Maputo and Mozambique has a high commissioner in New Delhi.

Namibia

PM Modi meets the President of Namibia, Dr. Netumbo Nandi-Ndaitwah at the State House in Windhoek, Namibia on July 09, 2025.

Relations between India and Namibia are warm and cordial. India was one of SWAPO's earliest supporters during the Namibian liberation movement. The first SWAPO embassy was established in India in 1986. India's observer mission was converted to a full High Commissioner on Namibia's Independence Day of 21 March 1990. India has helped train the Namibian Air Force since its creation in 1995. The two countries work closely in mutual multilateral organisations such as the United Nations, the Non-Aligned Movement and the Commonwealth of Nations. Namibia supports the expansion of the United Nations Security Council to include a permanent seat for India.

In 2008–09, trade between the two countries stood at approximately US$80 million. Namibia's main imports from India were drugs and pharmaceuticals, chemicals, agricultural machinery, automobile and automobile parts, glass and glassware, and plastic and linoleum products. India primarily imported nonferrous metals, ores, and metal scraps. Indian products are also exported to neighbouring South Africa and re-imported to Namibia as South African imports. Namibian diamonds are often exported to European diamond markets before being again imported to India. In 2009, the first direct sale of Namibian diamonds to India took place. In 2008, two Indian companies won a US$105 million contract from NamPower to lay a high-voltage direct current bi-polar line from Katima Mulilo to Otjiwarongo. Namibia is a beneficiary of the Indian Technical and Economic Cooperation (ITEC) programme for telecommunications professionals from developing countries.

India has a high commissioner in Windhoek and Namibia has a high commissioner in New Delhi. Namibia's high commissioner is also accredited for Bangladesh, the Maldives and Sri Lanka.

Niger

Both countries established diplomatic relations on 18 July 1977.

Nigeria

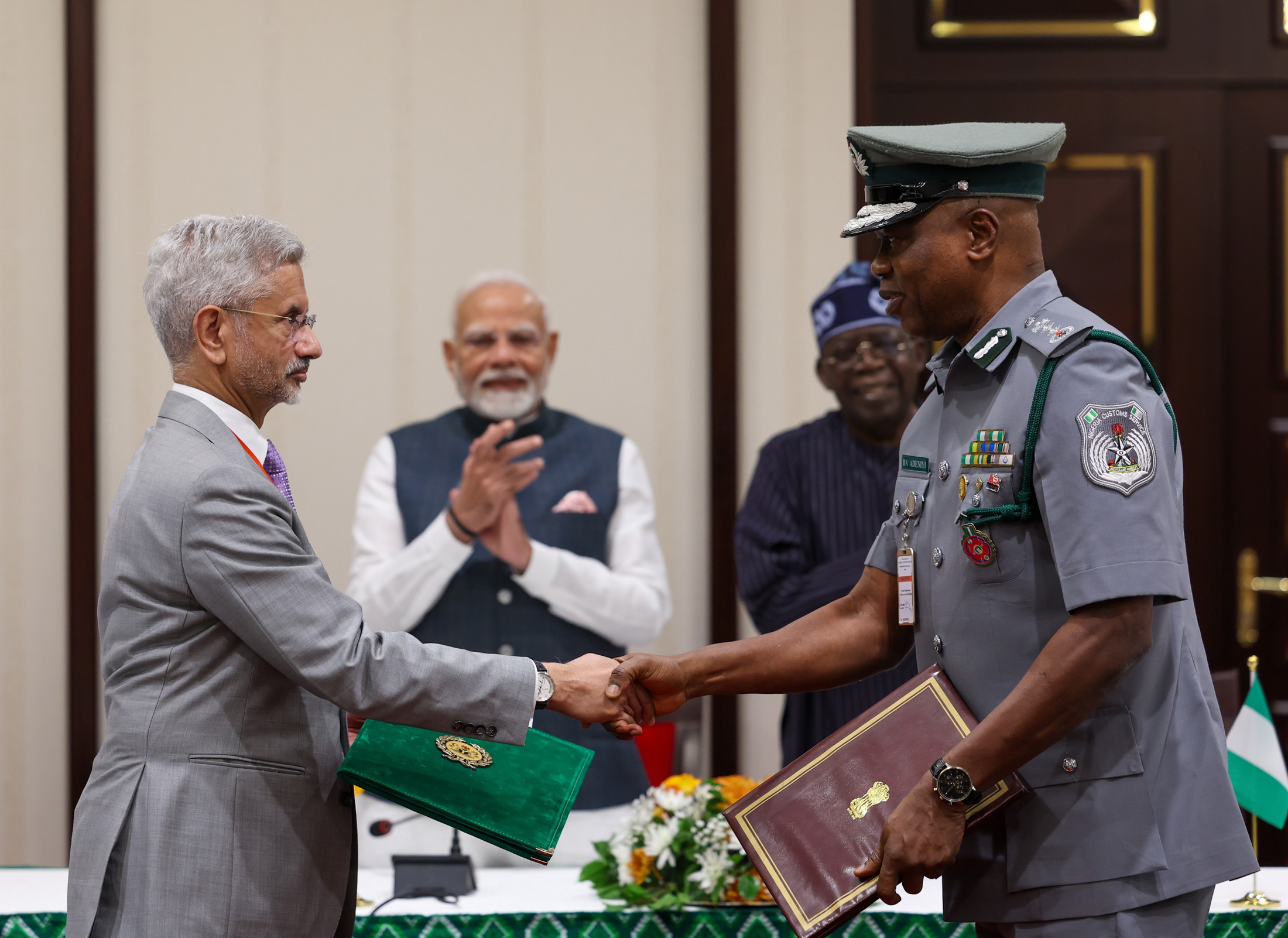
PM Modi and the President of Nigeria, Mr. Bola Ahmed Tinubu witnessing the Exchange of MoUs between India and Nigeria at Abuja Nigeria on November 17, 2024.

India has close relations with Nigeria. Twenty per cent of India's crude oil needs are supplied by Nigeria. India receives 40,000 barrels per day (6,400 m^{3}/d) from Nigeria. Trade between these two countries stands at $875 million in 2005–2006. Indian companies have also invested in manufacturing, pharmaceuticals, iron ore, steel, information technology, and communications, amongst other things. Both India and Nigeria, are members of the Commonwealth of Nations, G-77, and the Non-Aligned Movement. Former Nigerian president Olusegun Obasanjo was the guest of honour at the Republic Day parade in 1999, and the Indian prime minister Manmohan Singh visited Nigeria in 2007 and addressed the Nigerian Parliament.

Rwanda

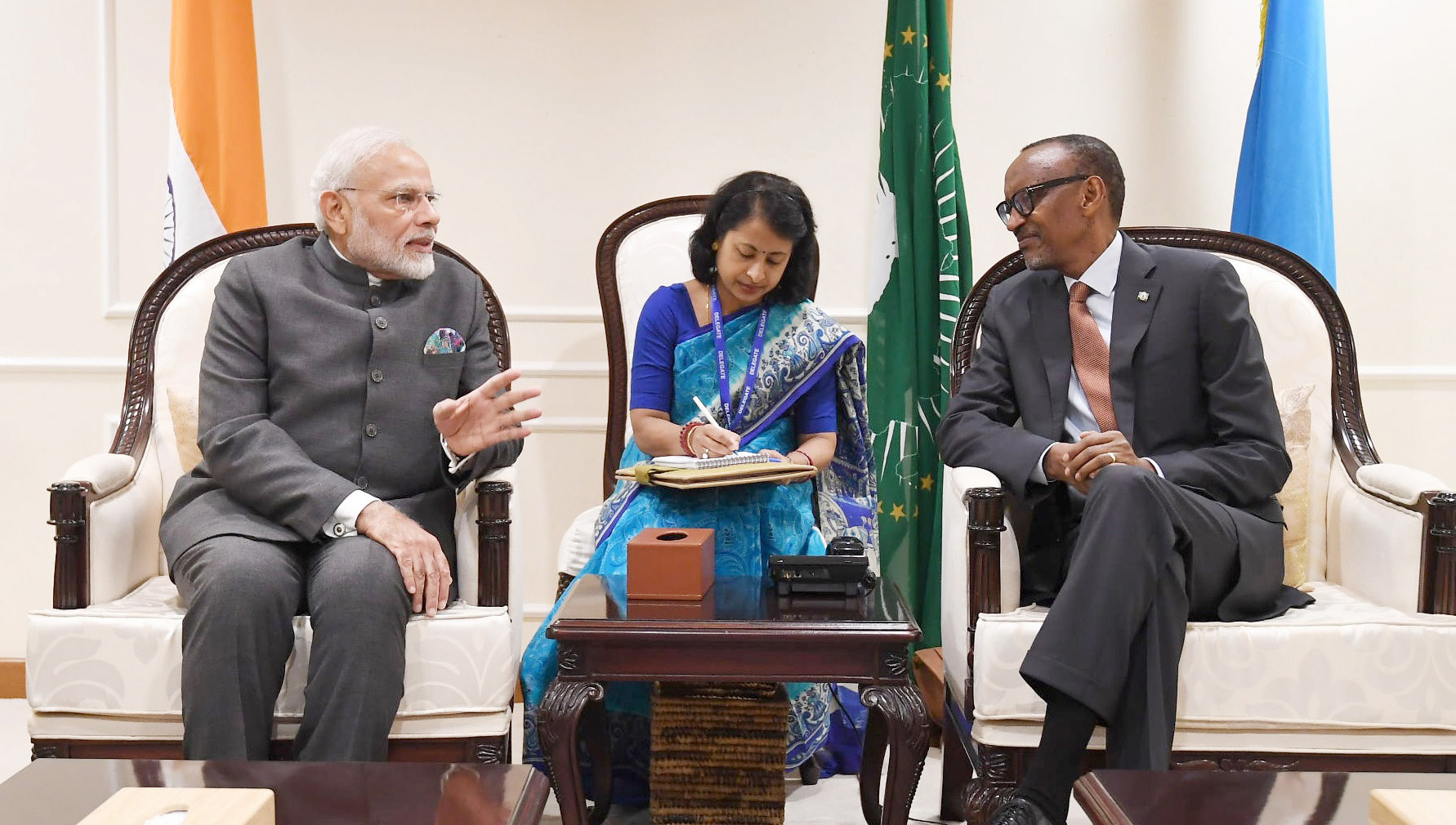
The Prime Minister, Shri Narendra Modi meeting the President of Rwanda, Mr. Paul Kagame, at Kigali, Rwanda on 23 July 2018

Indo-Rwandan relations are the foreign relations between the Republic of India and the Republic of Rwanda. India is represented in Rwanda through its honorary consulate in Kigali. Rwanda has been operating its Embassy in New Delhi since 1998 and appointed its first resident Ambassador in 2001.

Seychelles

PM Modi holds bilateral talks with the President of the Republic of Seychelles, Dr. Patrick Herminie

India–Seychelles relations are bilateral relations between the Republic of India and the Republic of Seychelles. India has a High Commission in Victoria while Seychelles maintains a High Commission in New Delhi.

South Africa

India and South Africa have always had strong relations even though India revoked diplomatic relations in protest of the apartheid regime in the mid-20th century. The history of British rule connects both lands. There is a large group of Indian South Africans. Mahatma Gandhi spent many years in South Africa, during which time he fought for the rights of the ethnic Indians. Nelson Mandela was inspired by Gandhi. After India's independence, India strongly condemned apartheid and refused diplomatic relations while apartheid was conducted as state policy in South Africa.

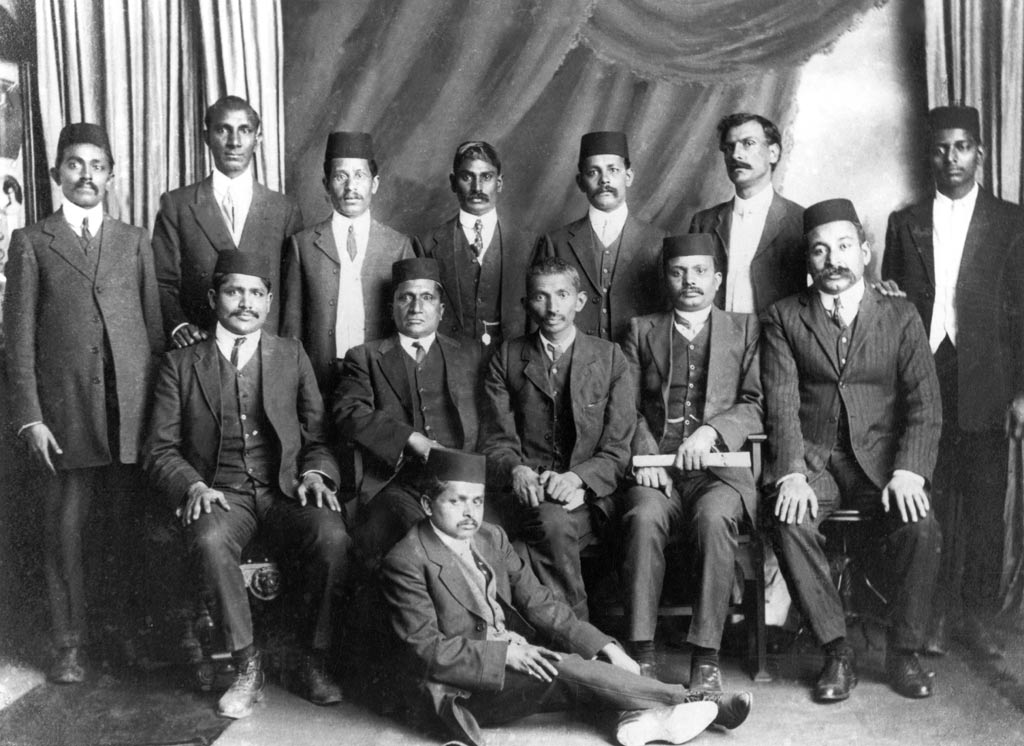
Mahatma Gandhi (middle row centre) with the leaders of the non-violent resistance movement in South Africa.

The two countries now have close economic, political, and sports relations. Trade between the two countries grew from $3 million in 1992–1993 to $4 billion in 2005–2006, and they aim to reach trade of $12 billion by 2010. One-third of India's imports from South Africa are gold bar. Diamonds that are mined from South Africa are polished in India. Nelson Mandela was awarded the Gandhi Peace Prize. The two countries are also members of the IBSA Dialogue Forum, with Brazil. India hopes to get large amounts of uranium from resource-rich South Africa, for India's growing civilian nuclear energy sector.

South Sudan

India recognised South Sudan on 10 July 2011, a day after South Sudan became an independent state. Right now, relations are economic. Pramit Pal Chaudhuri wrote in the Hindustan Times that South Sudan "has other attractions. As the Indian Foreign Ministry's literature notes, South Sudan is reported to have "some of the largest oil reserves in Africa outside Nigeria and Angola". An article in The Telegraph reported that South Sudan is "one of the poorest [countries] in the world, [but] is oil rich. Foreign ministry officials said New Delhi has a keen interest in increasing its investments in the oil fields in South Sudan, which now owns over two-thirds of the erstwhile united Sudan's oil fields."

In return for the oil resources that can be provided by South Sudan, India said it was willing to assist in developing infrastructure, training officials in health, education, and rural development. "We have compiled a definite road map using [sic] which India can help South Sudan."

Sudan

Both countries established diplomatic relations on 7 May 1956.

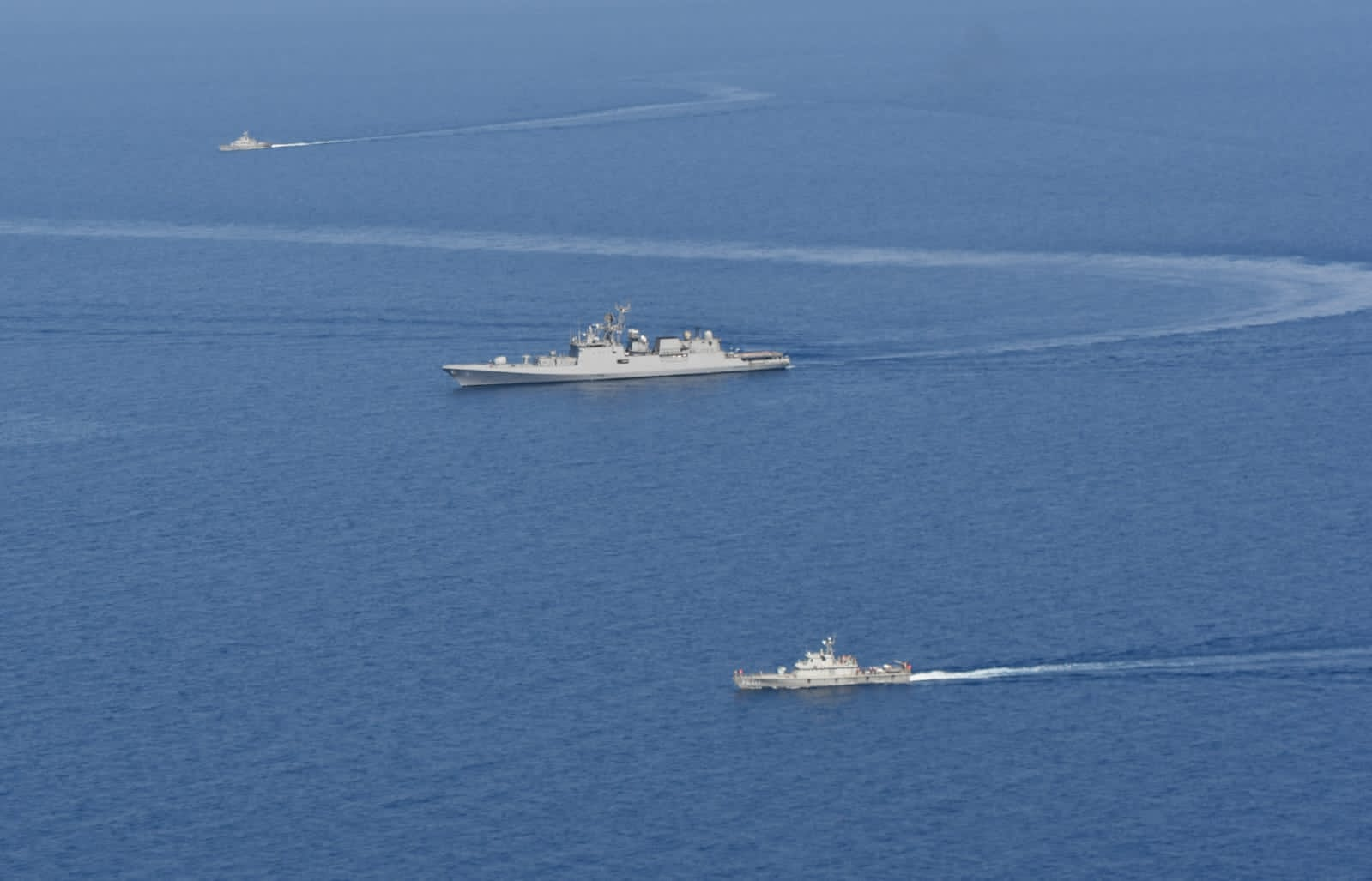
INS Tarkash sailing with Sudan Navy ships Almazz (PC 411) & Nimer (PC 413) as part of Maritime Partnership Exercise.

Indo-Sudanese relations have always been characterised as longstanding, close, and friendly, even since the early development stages of their countries. At the time of Indian independence, Sudan had contributed 70,000 pounds, which was used to build part of the National Defence Academy in Pune. The main building of NDA is called Sudan Block. The two nations established diplomatic relations shortly after India became known as one of the first Asian countries to recognise the newly independent African country. India and Sudan also share geographic and historical similarities, as well as economic interests. Both countries are former British colonies, and share a border with Saudi Arabia using a body of water. India and Sudan continue to have cordial relations, despite issues such as India's close relationship with Israel, India's solidarity with Egypt over border issues with Sudan, and Sudan's intimate bonds with Pakistan and Bangladesh. India had also contributed some troops as a United Nations peacekeeping force in Darfur.

Togo

Both countries established diplomatic relations on 31 August 1962.

The Prime Minister, Shri Narendra Modi meeting the President of Togo, Mr. Faure Essozimna Gnassingbe

Togo opened its embassy in New Delhi in October 2010. The High Commission of India in Accra, Ghana is concurrently accredited to Togo. Togolese President Gnassingbé Eyadéma made an official state visit to India in September 1994. During the visit, the two countries agreed to establish Joint Commission.

Uganda

Both countries established diplomatic relations on 9 October 1962.

The Prime Minister, Shri Narendra Modi at the ceremonial reception with the President of Uganda, Mr. Yoweri K. Museveni, at the State House, in Uganda.

India and Uganda established diplomatic relations in 1965, and each maintains a High Commissioner in the other's capital. The Indian High Commission in Kampala has concurrent accreditation to Burundi and Rwanda. Uganda hosts a large Indian community and India–Uganda relations cover a broad range of sectors including political, economic, commercial, cultural, and scientific cooperation.

Relations between India and Uganda began with the arrival of over 30,000 Indians in Uganda in the 19th century who were brought there to construct the Mombasa–Kampala railway line. Ugandan independence activists were inspired in their struggle for Ugandan independence by the success of the Indian independence movement and were also supported in their struggle by the Prime Minister of India Jawaharlal Nehru. Indo-Ugandan relations have been good since Uganda's independence except during the regime of Idi Amin. Amin in 1972 expelled over 55,000 people of Indian origin and 5,000 Indians who had formed the commercial and economic backbone of the country, accusing them of exploiting native Ugandans. Since the mid-1980s when President Yoweri Museveni came to power, relations have steadily improved. Today some 20,000 Indians and PIOs live or work in Uganda. Ethnic tensions between Indians and Ugandans have been a recurring issue in bilateral relations given the role of Indians in the Ugandan economy.

Zambia

Zimbabwe

African Union

As of the year 2011, India's total trade with Africa is over US$46 billion and its total investment is over US$11 billion with a US$5.7 billion line of credit for executing various projects in Africa.

Azali Assoumani, President of the African Union, is greeted by Narendra Modi(G20 Chairman) as an addition of African Union as 21st new member in G20, at the G20 summit in 2023.

India has had good relationships with most sub-Saharan African nations for most of its history. In the Prime Minister's visit to Mauritius in 1997, the two countries secured a deal to new Credit Agreement of INR 105 million (US$3 million) to finance the import by Mauritius of capital goods, consultancy services, and consumer durables from India. The government of India secured a rice and medicine agreement with the people of Seychelles. India continued to build upon its historically close relations with Ethiopia, Kenya, Uganda, and Tanzania. Visits from political ministers from Ethiopia provided opportunities for strengthening bilateral cooperation between the two countries in the fields of education and technical training, water resources management, and development of small industries. This has allowed India to gain benefits from nations that are forgotten by other Western Nations. The South African president, Thabo Mbeki, has called for a strategic relationship between India and South Africa to avoid imposition by Western Nations. India continued to build upon its close and friendly relations with Angola, Botswana, Lesotho, Malawi, Mozambique, Namibia, Swaziland, Zambia, and Zimbabwe. The Minister of Foreign Affairs arranged for the sending of Special Envoys to each of these countries during 1996–97 as a reaffirmation of India's assurance to strengthen cooperation with these countries in a spirit of South-South partnership. These relations have created a position of strength with African nations that other nations may not possess.

== Americas ==
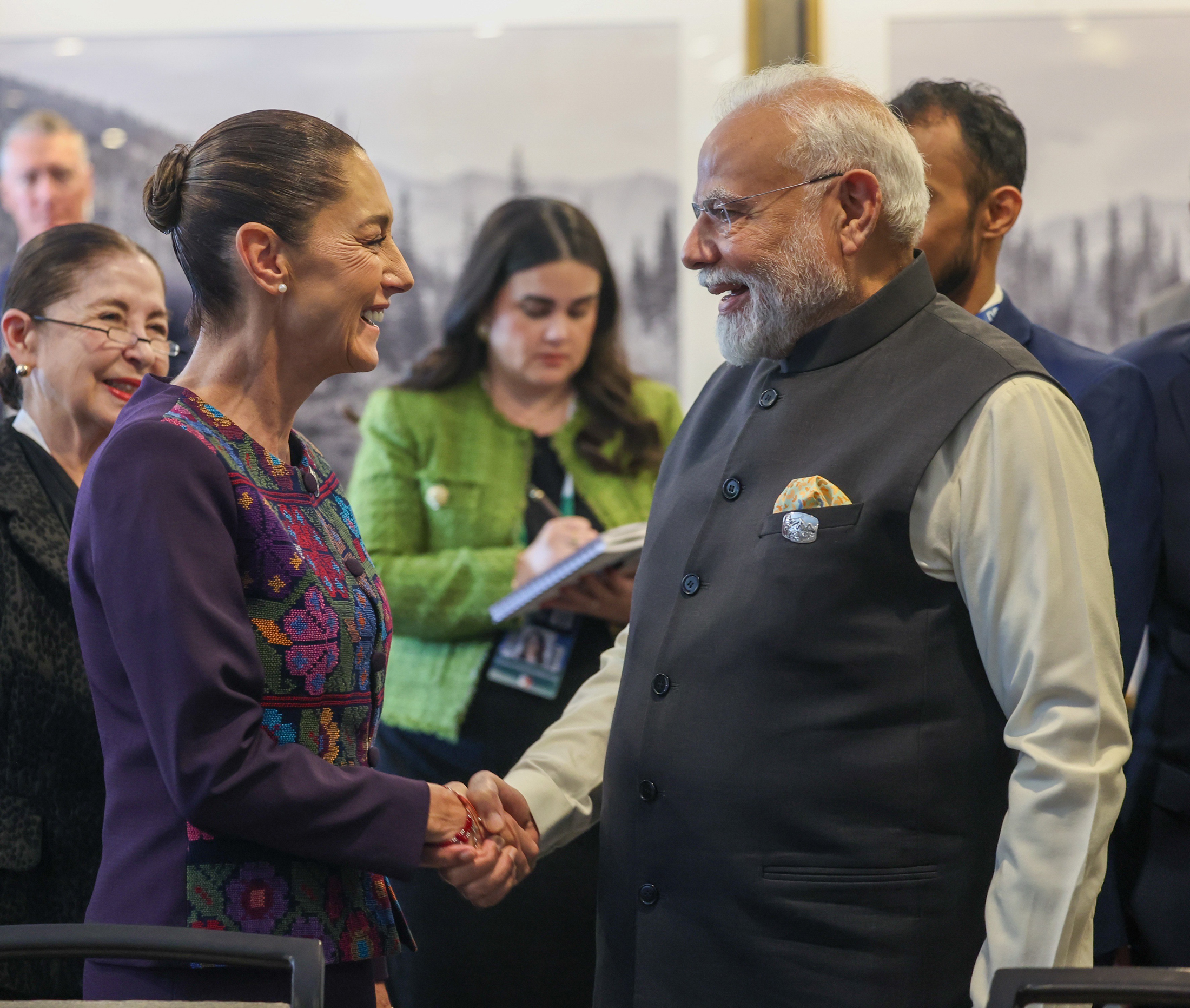
Prime Minister Narendra Modi meets the President of Mexico, Claudia Sheinbaum on the sidelines of 51st G7 Summit.

India's commonalities with developing nations in Latin America, especially Brazil and Mexico, have continued to grow. India and Brazil continue to work together on the reform of the Security Council through the G4 nations while having also increased strategic and economic cooperation through the IBSA Dialogue Forum. The process of finalising a Preferential Trade Agreement (PTA) with MERCOSUR (Brazil, Argentina, Uruguay, and Paraguay) is on the itinerary, and negotiations are being held with Chile. Brazilian president Luiz Inácio Lula da Silva was the guest of honour at the 2004 Republic Day celebrations in New Delhi.

=== North ===
Antigua and Barbuda

PM Modi with the Prime Minister of Antigua and Barbuda, Mr. Gaston Browne at Georgetown, in Guyana on November 20, 2024.

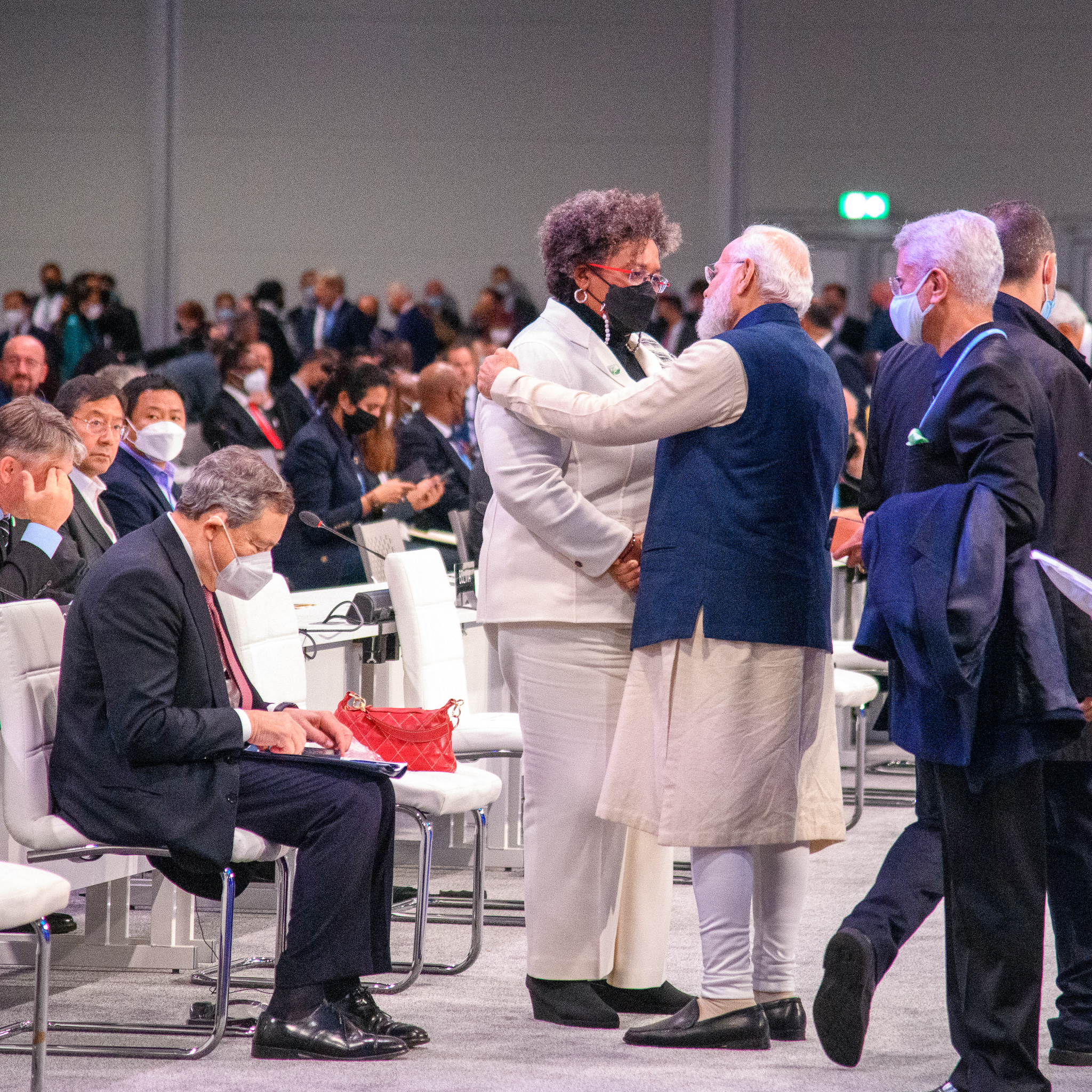
Indian Prime Minister Narendra Modi meeting Barbadian Prime Minister Mia Mottley at COP26 in Glasgow, Scotland; November 2021

Both countries have established diplomatic relations and have an Extradition Arrangement.

Barbados

India and Barbados established diplomatic relations on 30 November 1966 (the date of Barbados' national independence). On that date, the government of India gifted Barbados the throne in Barbados' national House of Assembly. India is represented in Barbados through its embassy in Suriname and an Indian consulate in Holetown, St. James. In 2011–12 the Indian-based firm Era's Lucknow Medical College and Hospital, established the American University of Barbados (AUB), as the island's first Medical School for international students. In 2015 the governments of Barbados and India signed a joint Open Skies Agreement. Today around 3,000 persons from India call Barbados home. Two-thirds are from India's Surat district of Gujarat, known as Suratis. Most of the Suratis are involved in trading. The rest are of Sindhi ancestry.

Belize

India has an Honorary Consulate in Belize City and Belize has an Honorary Consulate in New Delhi. Bilateral trade stood at US$45.3 million in 2014 and has steadily increased since. Belize and India have engaged in dialogue in the Central American Integration System (SICA), discussing anti-terrorism, climate change, and food security. India signed a Tax Information Exchange Agreement in 2013 with Belize. India also provides Belize with US$30 million as part of its foreign aid commitment to SICA countries. Citizens of Belize are eligible for scholarships in Indian universities under the Indian Technical and Economic Cooperation Programme and the Indian Council for Cultural Relations.

The two nations share a close cultural link due to Belize's large East Indian Population, estimated at 4% of the total population.

Canada

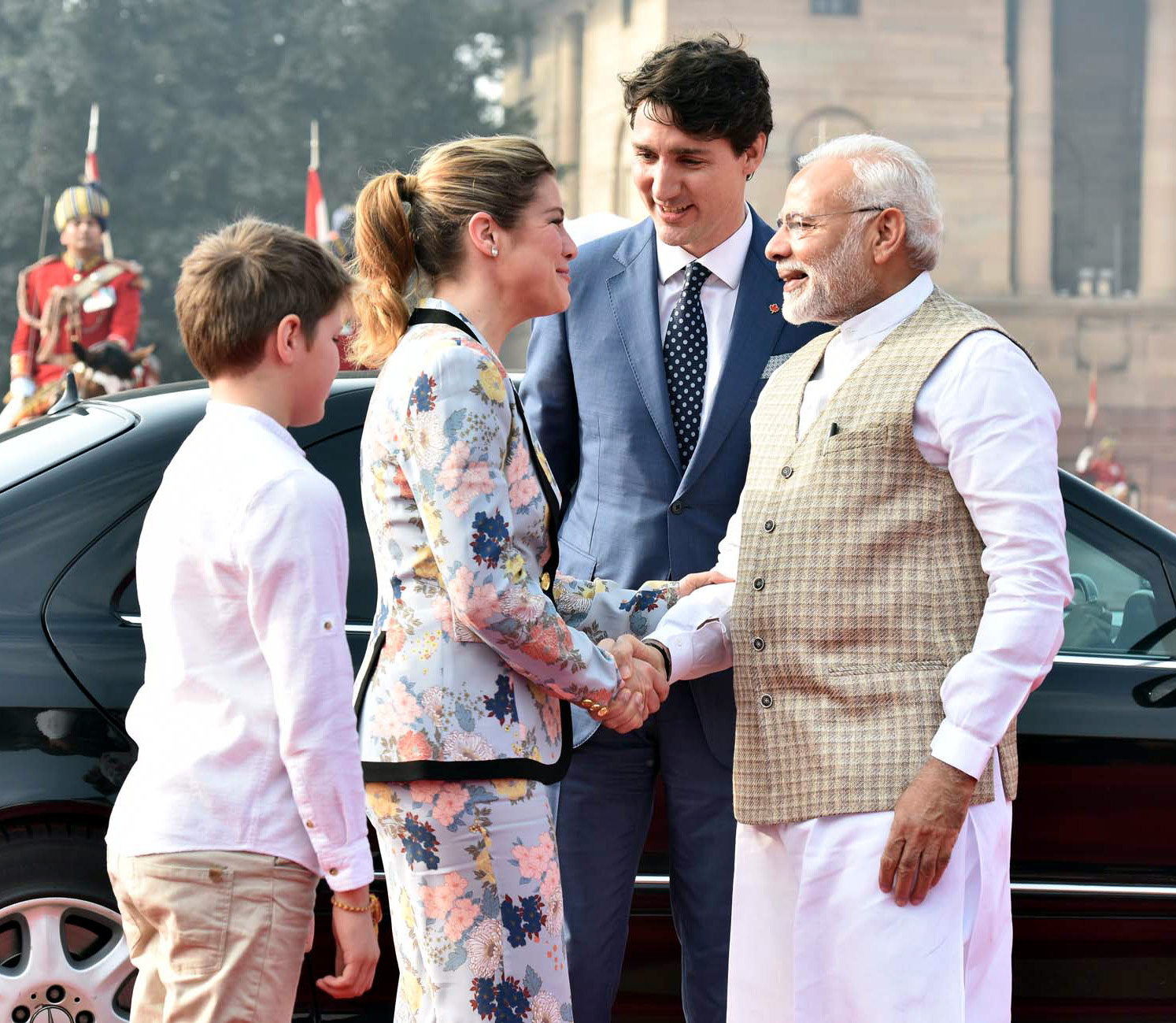
Canadian Prime Minister, Justin Trudeau receiving a welcome ceremony in Rashtrapati Bhavan, New Delhi, with PM Narendra Modi along with his family. (2018)

Indo-Canadian relations are the longstanding bilateral relations between India and Canada, which are built upon a "mutual commitment to democracy", "pluralism", and "people-to-people links", according to the government of Canada. In 2004, bilateral trade between India and Canada was at about C$2.45 billion. However, the botched handling of the Air India investigation and the case, in general, suffered a setback to Indo-Canadian relations. India's Smiling Buddha nuclear test led to connections between the two countries being frozen, with allegations that India broke the terms of the Colombo Plan. Although Jean Chrétien and Roméo LeBlanc both visited India in the late 1990s, relations were again halted after the Pokhran-II tests.

Canada-India relations have been on an upward trajectory since 2005. Governments at all levels, private-sector organisations, academic institutes in two countries, and people-to-people contacts—especially diaspora networks—have contributed through individual and concerted efforts to significant improvements in the bilateral relationship.

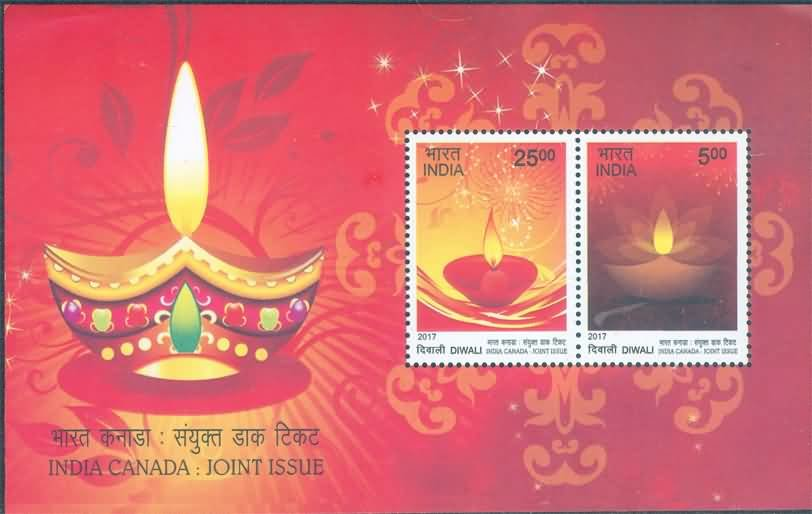
Stamp of India - 2017 - Diwali - Joint Issue With Canada

The two governments have agreed on important policy frameworks to advance the bilateral relationship. In particular, the Nuclear Cooperation Agreement (signed in June 2010) and the current successful negotiations of the Comprehensive Economic Partnership Agreement (CEPA) constitute a watershed in Canada-India relations.

PM Modi meets the Prime Minister of Canada, Mr. Mark Carney at Hyderabad House, in New Delhi

The two governments have attempted to make up for lost time and are eager to complete CEPA negotiations by 2013 and ensure its ratification by 2014. After the conclusion of CEPA, Canada and India must define the areas for their partnership, which will depend on their ability to convert common interests into common action and respond effectively for steady cooperation. For example, during "pull-aside" meetings between Prime Minister Manmohan Singh and Stephen Harper at the G-20 summit in Mexico in June 2012, and an earlier meeting in Toronto between External Affairs Minister S. M. Krishna and John Baird, the leaders discussed developing a more comprehensive partnership going beyond food security and including the possibility of tie-ups in the energy sector, hydrocarbon.

On 16 September 2026, Indian Union Minister Manohar Lal met with delegations from the US and Canada at the G20 Energy Abundance Working Group meetings in Huston. The discussions focused on expanding partnerships with the US in clean energy, infrastructure, and emerging technologies, while exploring joint projects with Canada in energy efficiency, low emission technologies, and offshore exploration.

Cuba

Relations between India and Cuba are close and warm. Both nations are part of the Non-Aligned Movement. Cuba has repeatedly called for a more "democratic" representation of the United Nations Security Council and supports India's candidacy as a permanent member of a reformed Security Council. Fidel Castro said that "The maturity of India..., its unconditional adherence to the principles which lay at the foundation of the Non-Aligned Movement give us the assurances that under the wise leadership of Indira Gandhi (the former Prime Minister of India), the non-aligned countries will continue advancing in their inalienable role as a bastion for peace, national independence and development..."

India has an embassy in Havana, the capital of Cuba, which opened in January 1960. This had particular significance as it symbolised Indian solidarity with the Cuban revolution. India had been one of the first countries in the world to have recognised the new Cuban government after the Cuban Revolution.

Cuba has an embassy in New Delhi, the Indian capital.

Jamaica

PM Modi meets the Prime Minister of Jamaica, Dr. Andrew Holness at Hyderabad House, in New Delhi

Relations between India and Jamaica are generally cordial and close. There are many cultural and political connections inherited from British colonial rule, such as membership in the Commonwealth of Nations, parliamentary democracy, the English language, and cricket.

Both nations are members of the Non-Aligned Movement, the United Nations and the Commonwealth, and Jamaica supports India's candidacy for permanent membership in a reformed UN Security Council.

During the British era, Indians voluntarily went to jobs in Jamaica and the West Indies. This has created a considerable population of people of Indian origin in Jamaica. India has a High Commission in Kingston, whilst Jamaica has a consulate in New Delhi and plans to upgrade it to a High Commission soon.

Mexico

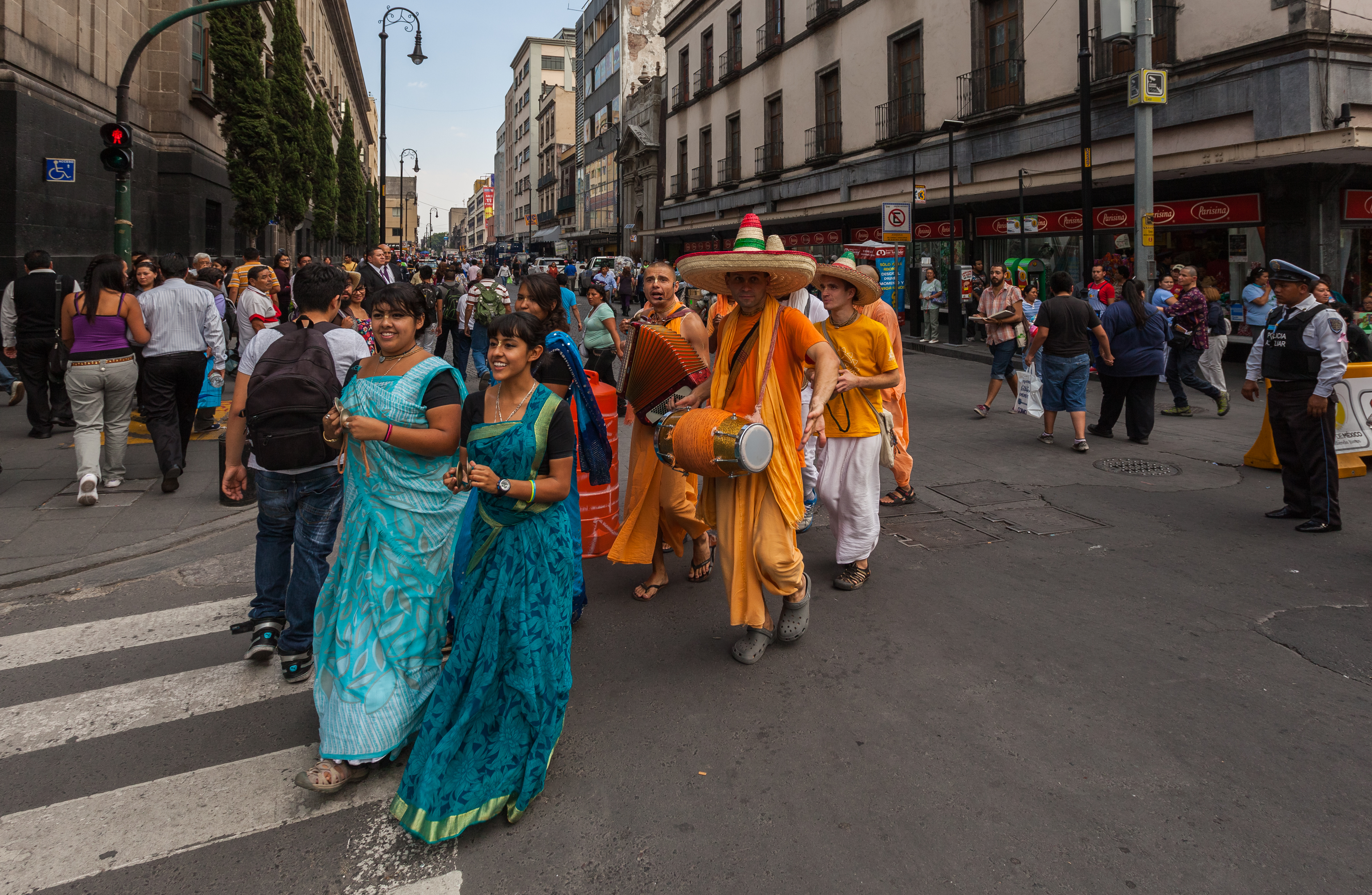
Indians in Mexico City

Mexico is a very important and major economic partner of India. Nobel Prize laureate and ambassador to India Octavio Paz wrote his book In Light of India, which is an analysis of Indian history and culture. Both nations are regional powerss and members of the G-20 major economies.

- India has an embassy in Mexico City.
- Mexico has an embassy in New Delhi and a consulate in Mumbai.

Nicaragua

Bilateral relations between India and Nicaragua have been limited to SICA dialogue and visits by Nicaraguan Ministers to India. India maintains an honorary consul general in Nicaragua, concurrently accredited to the Indian embassy in Panama City and Nicaragua used to maintain an embassy in India but was reduced to an honorary consulate general in New Delhi. the current Foreign minister Samuel Santos López visited India in 2008 for the SICA-India Foreign ministers' meeting and in 2013 for high-level talks with the then External Affairs Minister Salman Khurshid which also expanded bilateral trade with the two countries reaching a total of US$60.12 million during 2012–13.

Panama

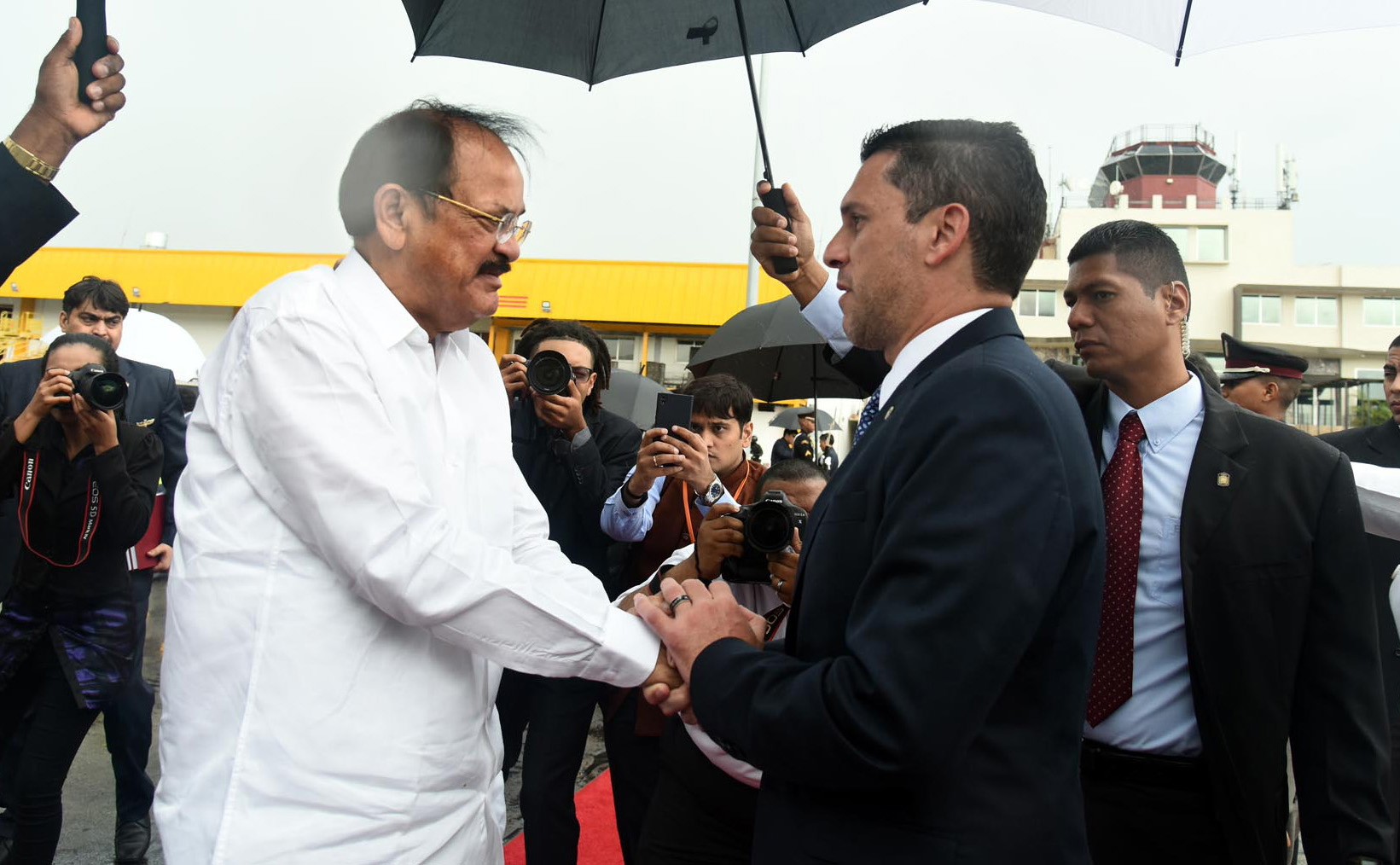
The Vice-president, Shri M. Venkaiah Naidu being bid farewell by the Vice-Minister of Foreign Affairs, Mr. Luis Miguel Hincapie, on his departure, in Panama on 10 May 2018

Bilateral relations between Panama and India have been growing steadily, reflecting the crucial role the Panama Canal plays in global trade and commerce. Moreover, with over 15,000 Indians living in Panama, diplomatic ties have considerably increased over the past decade.

The opening of the expanded Canal in 2016 is expected to provide new prospects for maritime connectivity. In seeking to rapidly strengthen trade relations, such as the flow of trade tripling between the two countries, India is keen to leverage these transit trade facilities in Panama to access the wider market of Latin America. Along with pursuing a free trade agreement, India wants to promote investment in various sectors of Panama's economy, including the banking and maritime industry and the multimodal centre of the Colón Free Trade Zone.

Paraguay

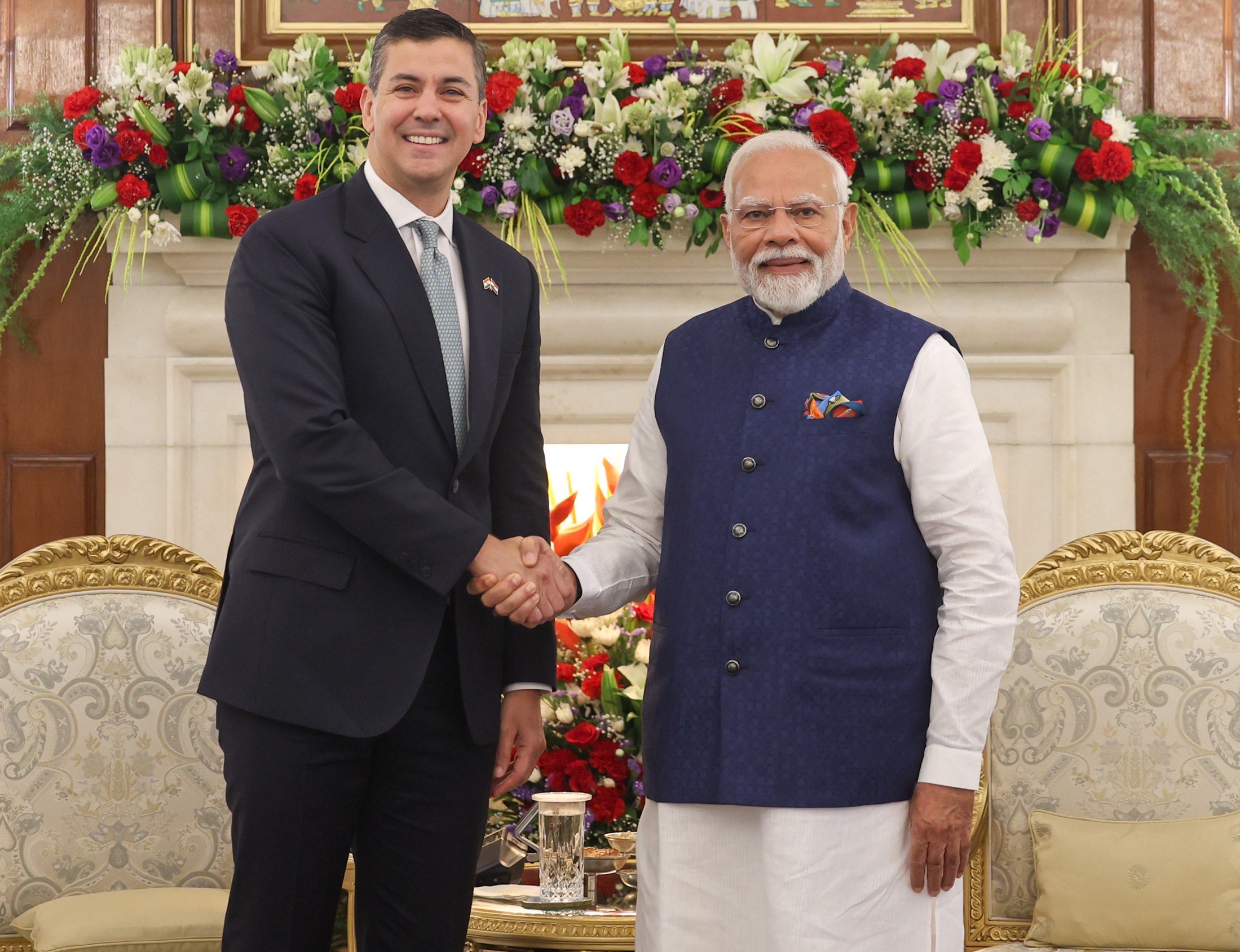
Prime Minister Narendra Modi meets the President of Paraguay Santiago Peña

The bilateral relations between the Republic of India and Paraguay have been traditionally strong due to strong commercial, cultural, and strategic cooperation. India is represented in Paraguay through its embassy in Buenos Aires in Argentina. India also has an Honorary Consul-General in Asuncion. Paraguay opened its embassy in India in 2005. In May 2012, Fernando Lugo became the first Paraguayan President to visit India. He was accompanied by the Ministers of Foreign Affairs, Agriculture and Animal Husbandry, and Commerce, and other senior government officials.

Paraguay supported India's bid for election to the UN Human Rights Council for the term 2015–17.

On 30 December 2020, the Union Cabinet of India approved the opening an embassy in Asunción. The embassy was inaugurated in 2022.

President of Paraguay, Santiago Peña visited India in June 2025 and held delegation-level discussions with the Indian prime minister Narendra Modi, during which Paraguay informed India of its stand with India in the fight against terrorism. Both countries agreed on strategic outlook and a commitment to a shared future of sustainable growth and close economic cooperation. Also agreed to cooperate in sectors like digital technology, critical minerals, energy, agriculture, health, and space.

The prime minister, Shri Narendra Modi meeting the, President of the Republic of Trinidad & Tobago, Ms. Christine Carla Kangaloo at Port of Spain, in Republic of Trinidad and Tobago

Trinidad & Tobago

Bilateral relations between the Republic of India and the Republic of Trinidad and Tobago have considerably expanded in recent years, with both nations building strategic and commercial ties. Both nations formally established diplomatic relations in 1962.

Both nations were part of the British Empire; India supported the independence of Trinidad and Tobago from British rule and established its diplomatic mission in 1962 – the year that Trinidad and Tobago officially gained independence. They possess diverse natural and economic resources and are the largest economies in their respective regions. Both are members of the Commonwealth of Nations, the United Nations, G-77 and the Non-Aligned Movement (NAM).

The Republic of India operates a High Commission in Port of Spain, whilst the Republic of Trinidad and Tobago operates a High Commission in New Delhi.

United States of America

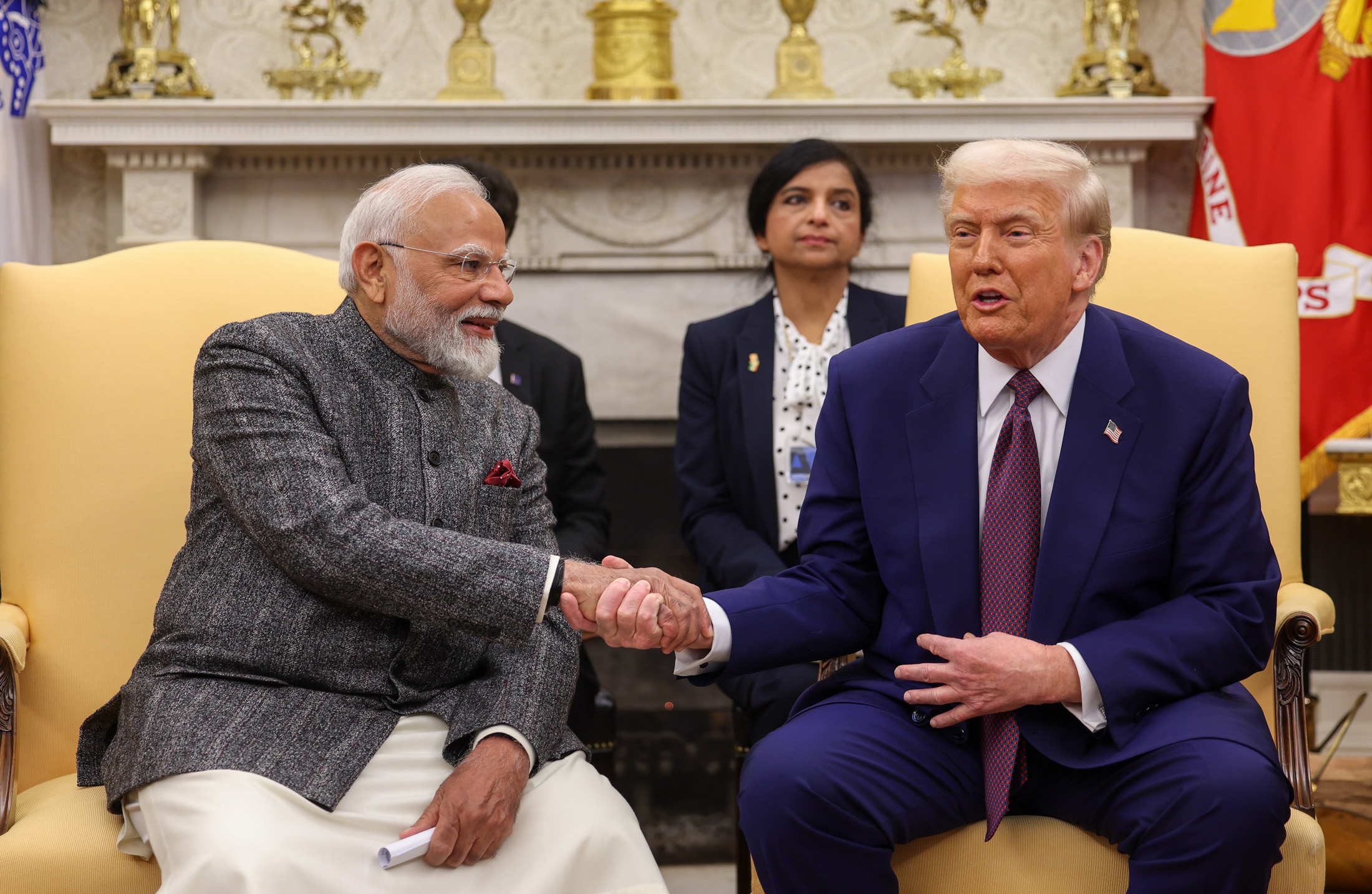
Prime Minister of India Narendra Modi and US President Donald Trump in 2025.

Before and during the Second World War, the United States under President Roosevelt gave strong support to the Indian independence movement despite being allies to Britain. Relations between India and the United States were lukewarm following Indian independence, as India took a leading position in the Non-Aligned Movement, and received support from the Soviet Union. The US provided support to India in 1962 during its war with China. For most of the Cold War, the USA tended to have warmer relations with Pakistan, primarily as a way to contain Soviet-friendly India and to use Pakistan to back the Afghan Mujahideen against the Soviet occupation of Afghanistan. An Indo-Soviet Treaty of Friendship and Cooperation, signed in 1971, also positioned India against the USA.

After the Sino-Indian War and the Indo-Pakistani War of 1965, India made considerable changes to its foreign policy. It developed a close relationship with the Soviet Union and started receiving massive military equipment and financial assistance from the USSR. This harmed the Indo-US relationship. The United States saw Pakistan as a counterweight to pro-Soviet India and started giving the former military assistance. This created an atmosphere of suspicion between India and the US. The Indo-US relationship suffered a considerable setback when the Soviets took over Afghanistan and India overtly supported the Soviet Union.

Relations between India and the United States came to an all-time low during the early 1970s. Despite reports of atrocities in East Pakistan, and being told, most notably in the Blood telegram, of genocidal activities being perpetrated by Pakistani forces, the US Secretary of State Henry Kissinger and US President Richard Nixon did nothing to discourage then-Pakistani President Yahya Khan and the Pakistan Army. Kissinger was particularly concerned about Soviet expansion into South Asia as a result of a treaty of friendship that had recently been signed between India and the Soviet Union and sought to demonstrate to the People's Republic of China the value of a tacit alliance with the United States. During the Indo-Pakistani War of 1971, Indian Armed Forces, along with the Mukti Bahini, succeeded in liberating East Pakistan which soon declared independence. Nixon feared that an Indian invasion of West Pakistan would mean total Soviet domination of the region and that it would seriously undermine the global position of the United States and the regional position of America's new tacit ally, China. To demonstrate to China the bona fides of the United States as an ally, and in direct violation of the Congress-imposed sanctions on Pakistan, Nixon sent military supplies to Pakistan, routing them through Jordan and Iran, while also encouraging China to increase its arms supplies to Pakistan.

When Pakistan's defeat in the eastern sector seemed certain, Nixon sent the USS Enterprise to the Bay of Bengal, a move deemed by the Indians as a nuclear threat. The Enterprise arrived at the station on 11 December 1971. On 6 and 13 December, the Soviet Navy dispatched two groups of ships, armed with nuclear missiles, from Vladivostok; they trailed US Task Force 74 into the Indian Ocean from 18 December 1971 until 7 January 1972. The Soviets also sent nuclear submarines to ward off the threat posed by USS Enterprise in the Indian Ocean.

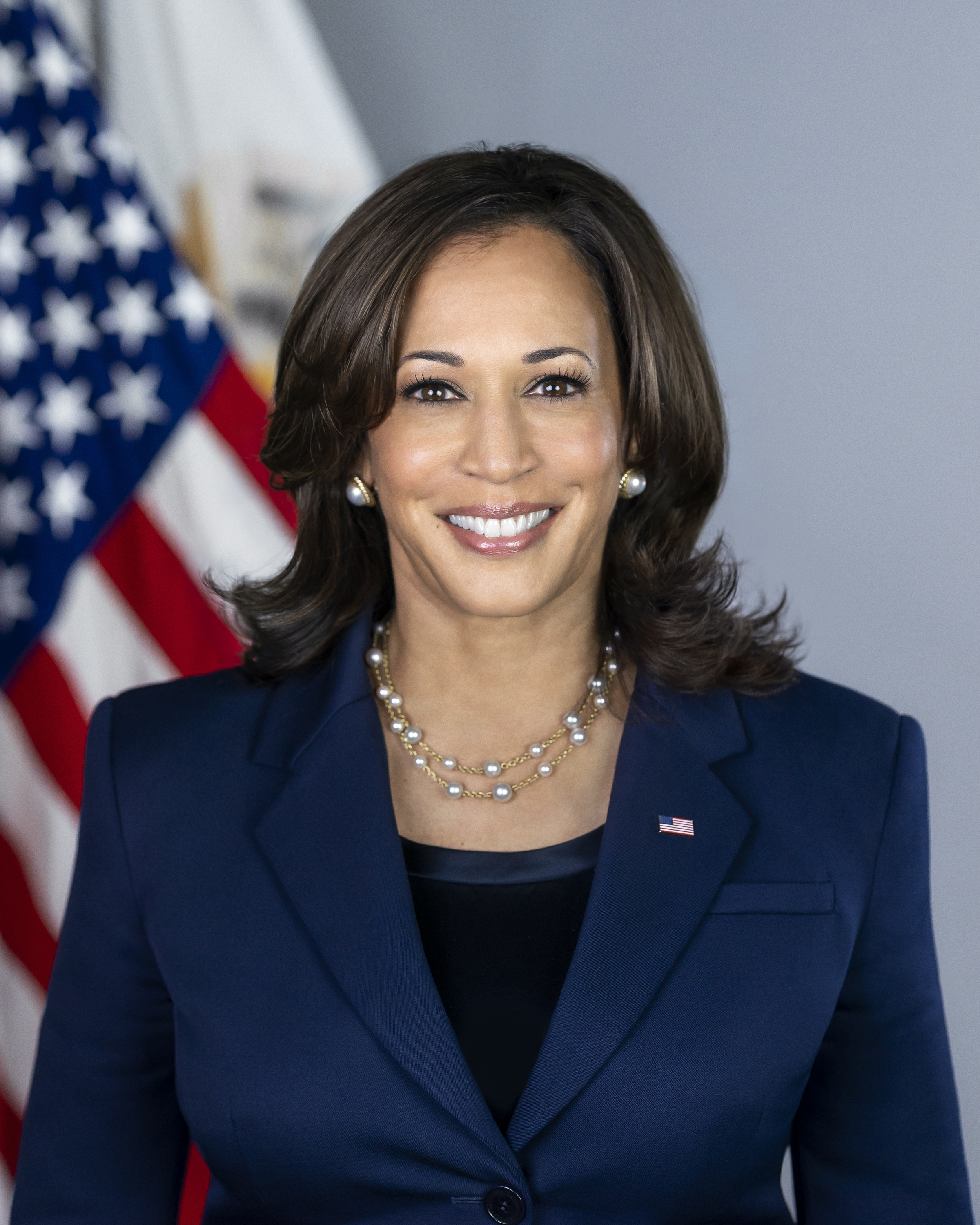
Kamala Harris is the 49th Vice-president of the United States. She is the first female, the first person of colour, as well as the first Indian American vice-president.

Though American efforts had no effect in turning the tide of the war, the incident involving USS Enterprise is viewed as the trigger for India's subsequent interest in developing nuclear weapons. American policy towards the end of the war was dictated primarily by a need to restrict the escalation of the war on the Western sector to prevent the 'dismemberment' of West Pakistan. Years after the war, many American writers criticised the White House policies during the war as being badly flawed and ill-serving to the interests of the United States. India carried out nuclear tests a few years later, resulting in sanctions being imposed by the United States, further drifting the two countries apart. In recent years, Kissinger came under fire for comments made during the Indo-Pakistan War in which he described Indians as "bastards". Kissinger has since expressed his regret over the comments.

After the Cold War

Since the end of the Cold War, India-USA relations have improved dramatically. This has been fostered by the fact that the United States and India are both democracies and have a large and growing trade relationship. During the Gulf War, the economy of India went through an extremely difficult phase. The Government of India adopted liberalised economic systems. After the break-up of the Soviet Union, India improved diplomatic relations with the members of NATO, particularly Canada, France, and Germany. In 1992, India established formal diplomatic relations with Israel.

In recent years, India-United States relations have still improved significantly during the Premiership of Narendra Modi since 2014. Both sides are committed to a "Free and Open Indo-Pacific".

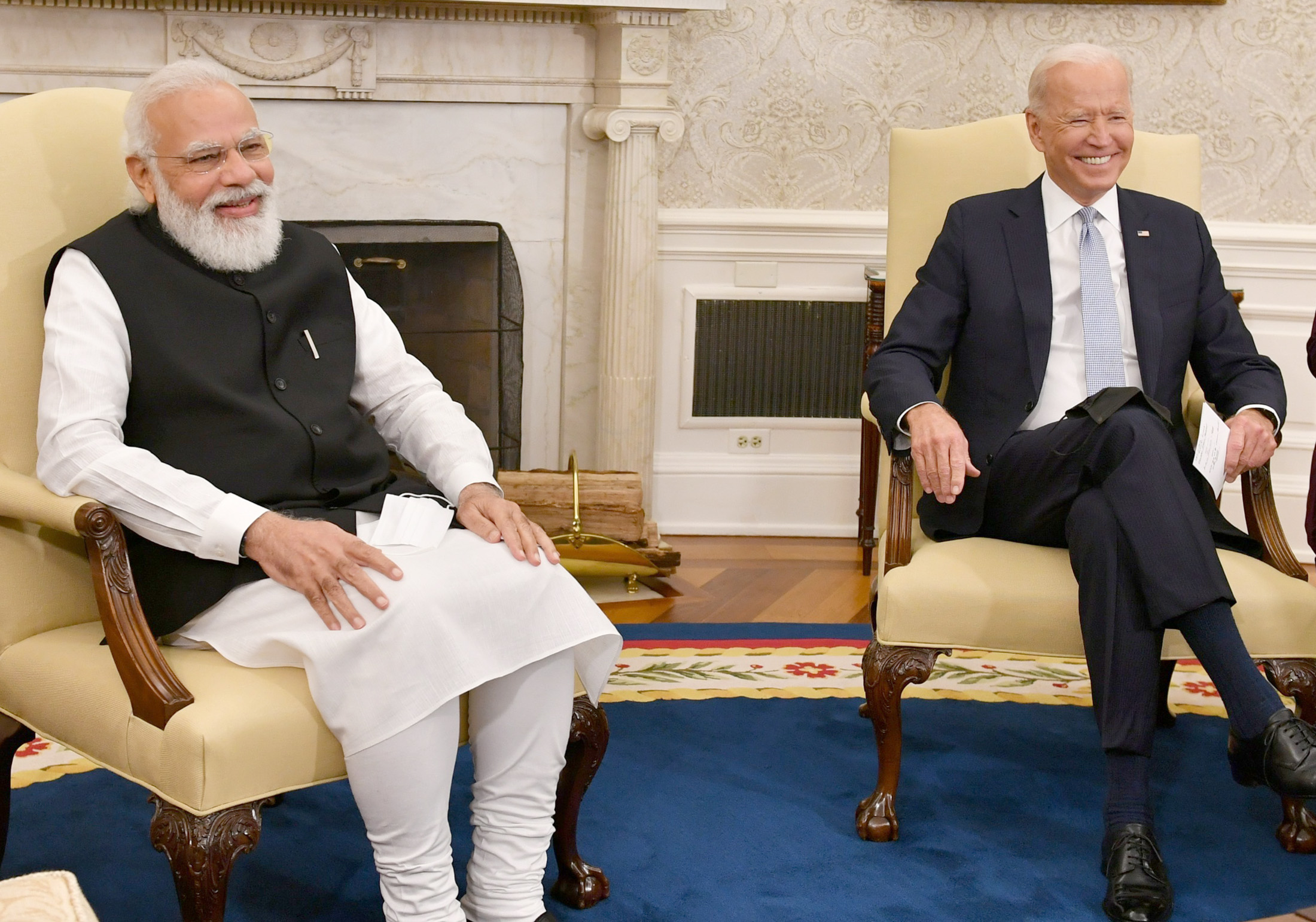
Prime Minister Narendra Modi in a bilateral meeting with US President Joe Biden, at the White House

Pokhran tests reaction

In 1998, India tested nuclear weapons, which resulted in several US, Japanese, and European sanctions on India. India's then defence minister, George Fernandes, said that India's nuclear programme was necessary as it provided a deterrence to some potential nuclear threats. Most of the sanctions imposed on India were removed by 2001. India has categorically stated that it will never use weapons first but will defend itself if attacked.

The economic sanctions imposed by the United States in response to India's nuclear tests in May 1998 appeared, at least initially, to seriously damage Indo-American relations. President Bill Clinton imposed wide-ranging sanctions according to the 1994 Nuclear Non-Proliferation Prevention Act. US sanctions on Indian entities involved in the nuclear industry and opposition to international financial institution loans for non-humanitarian assistance projects in India. The United States encouraged India to sign the Comprehensive Nuclear-Test-Ban Treaty (CTBT) immediately and without condition. The United States also called for restraint in missile and nuclear testing and deployment by both India and Pakistan. The non-proliferation dialogue initiated after the 1998 nuclear tests has bridged many of the gaps in understanding between the countries.

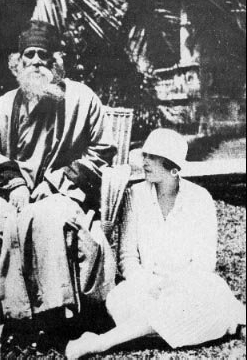
Nobel Laurate Rabindranath Tagore and Argentine writer Victoria Ocampo on the grounds of Villa Ocampo

=== South ===
Argentina

Formal relations between both countries were first established in 1949. India has an embassy in Buenos Aires, and Argentina has an embassy in New Delhi. As of January 2025, the Indian Ambassador to Argentina (concurrently accredited to Uruguay and Paraguay) is Shri Ajaneesh Kumar.

According to the Ministry of External Affairs of the Government of India, "Under the 1968 Visa agreement, (Argentine) fees for transit and tourist visas have been abolished. Under the new visa agreement signed during the Argentine Presidential visit in October 2009, it has been agreed that five-year multi-entry business visas would be given free of cost. The Embassy of India in Buenos Aires gives Cafe Con Visa (coffee with visa) to Argentine visitors. The applicants are invited for coffee and a visa is given immediately. This has been praised by the Argentine media, public and the Foreign Minister himself."

Brazil

Relations between Brazil and India have been extended to diverse areas such as science and technology, pharmaceuticals, and space, as both are member nations of BRICS. The two-way trade in 2007 nearly tripled to US$3.12 billion from US$1.2 billion in 2004. India attaches tremendous importance to its relationship with this Latin American giant and hopes to see the areas of cooperation expand in the coming years.

Both countries want the participation of developing countries in the UNSC permanent membership since the underlying philosophy for both of them is: UNSC should be more democratic, legitimate and representative – the G4 is a novel grouping for this realisation.

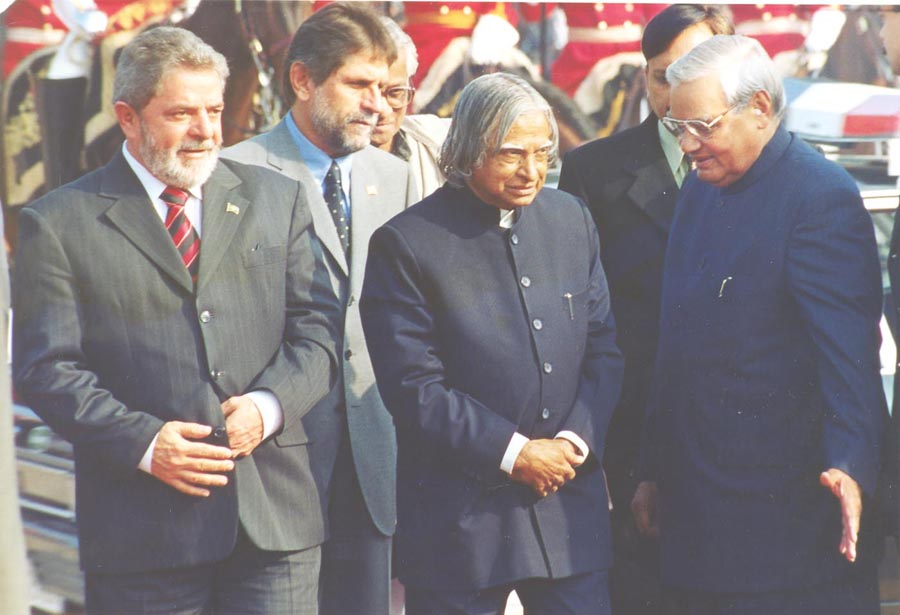
The President Dr. A.P.J. Abdul Kalam and the Prime Minister Shri Atal Bihari Vajpayee receiving the Chief Guest, the President of the Federative Republic of Brazil Mr. Luiz Inacio Lula Da Silva on Republic Day Parade-2004.

Brazil and India are deeply committed to IBSA (South-South cooperation) initiatives and attach utmost importance to this trilateral cooperation between the three large, multi-ethnic, multi-racial and multi-religious developing countries, which are bound by the common principle of pluralism and democracy.

Bolivia

Chile

Colombia

Both countries established diplomatic ties on 19 January 1959. Since then, the relationship between the two countries has been gradually increasing with more frequent diplomatic visits to promote political, commercial, cultural, and academic exchanges. Colombia is currently the commercial point of entry into Latin America for Indian companies.

Ecuador

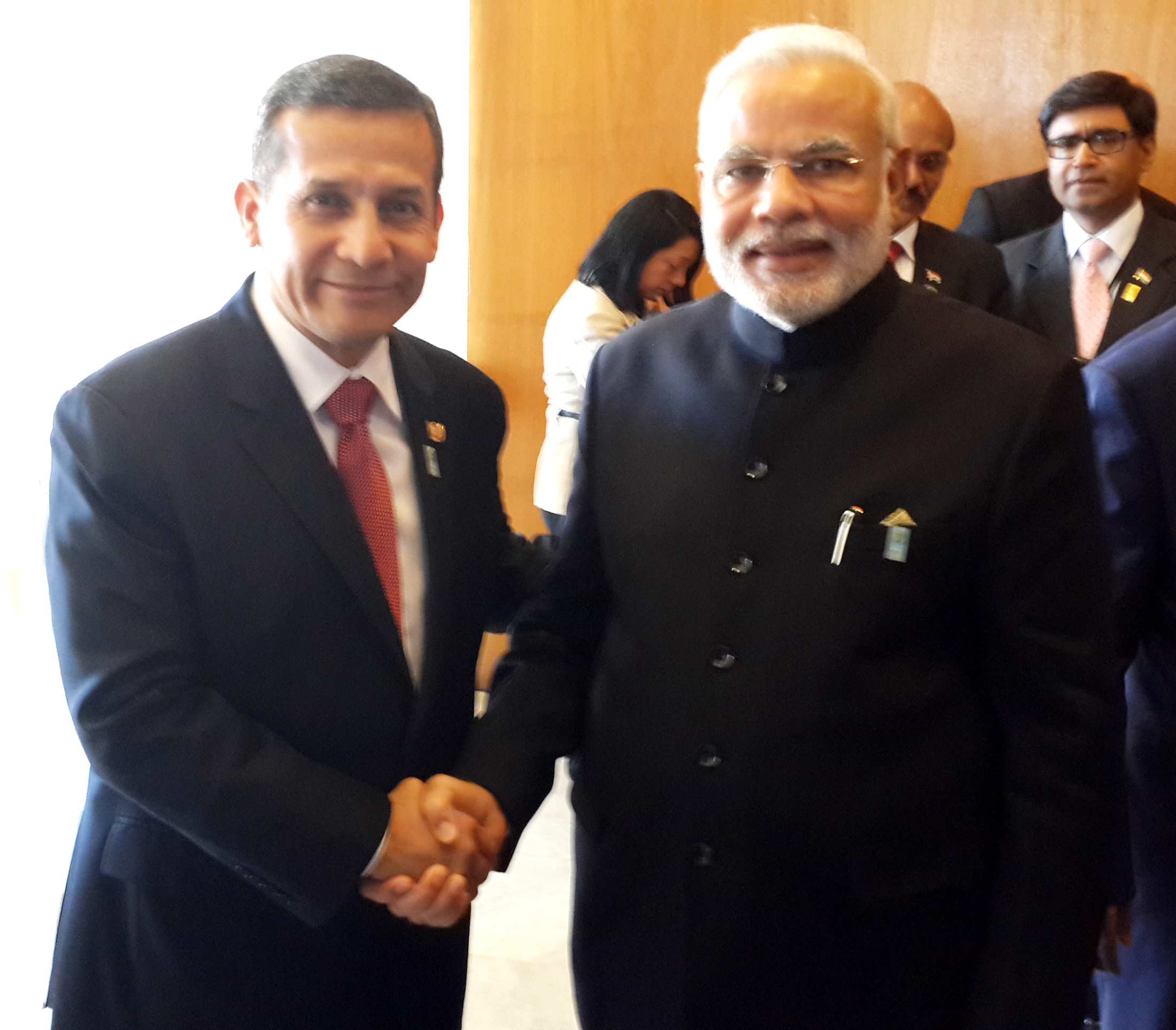
The Prime Minister, Shri Narendra Modi meeting the President of the Republic of Peru, Mr. Ollanta Humala, on the sidelines of the Sixth BRICS Summit, at Brasilia, in Brazil on 16 July 2014

Guyana

Paraguay

Peru

Suriname

Uruguay

Venezuela

Diplomatic relations between India and Venezuela were established on 1 October 1959. India maintains an embassy in Caracas, while Venezuela maintains an embassy in New Delhi.

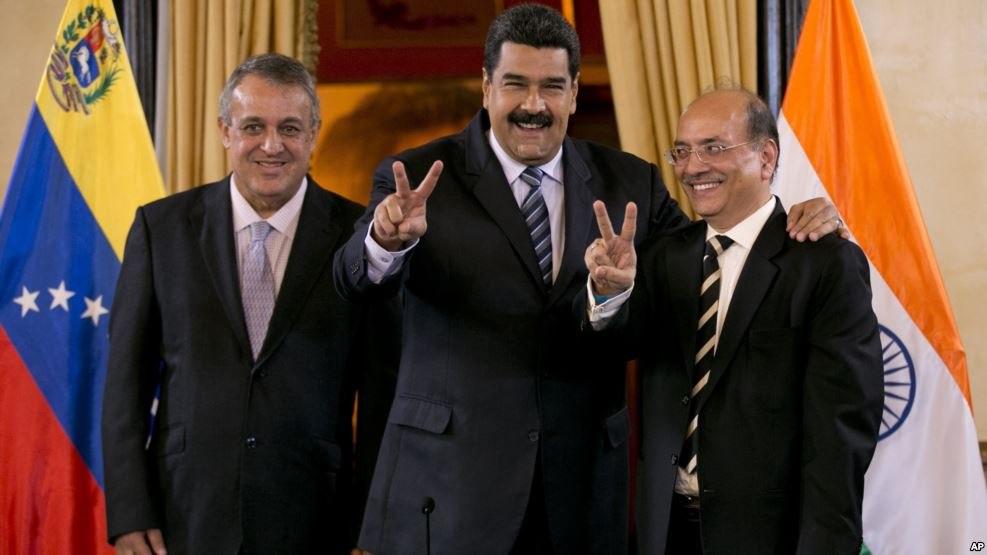
Venezuelan President Nicolas Maduro, ONGC Executive Director Narendra Kumar Verma and PDVSA President Eulogio Del Pino

There have been several visits by heads of state and government, and other high-level officials between the countries. President Hugo Chávez visited New Delhi on 4–7 March 2005. Chávez met with Indian president APJ Abdul Kalam and Prime Minister Manmohan Singh. The two countries signed six agreements, including one to establish a Joint Commission to promote bilateral relations and another on cooperation in the hydrocarbon sector. Foreign Minister Nicolás Maduro visited India to attend the First Meeting of the India-CELAC Troika Foreign Ministers meeting in New Delhi on 7 August 2012.

The Election Commission of India (ECI) and the National Electoral Council (CNE) of Venezuela signed an MoU during a visit by Indian Election Commissioner V S Sampath to Caracas in 2012. The Minister of State for Corporate Affairs visited Venezuela to attend the state funeral of President Chávez in March 2013. The President and Prime Minister of India expressed condolences on the death of Chávez. The Rajya Sabha, the upper house of Parliament, observed a minute's silence to mark his death. Ambassador Smita Purushottam represented India at the swearing-in ceremony of Chávez's successor Nicolás Maduro on 19 April 2013.

Citizens of Venezuela are eligible for scholarships under the Indian Technical and Economic Cooperation Programme and the Indian Council for Cultural Relations.

== Asia ==
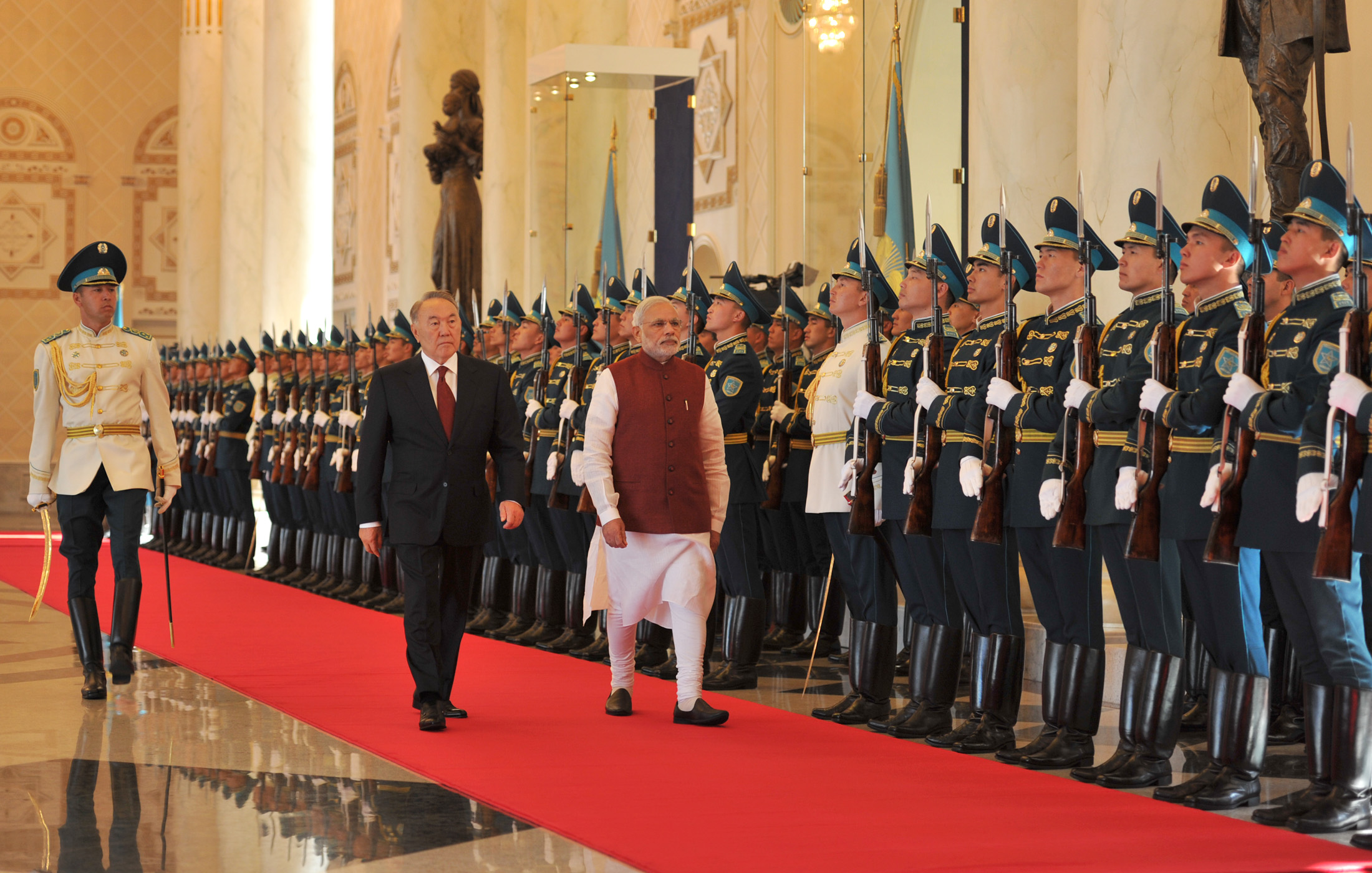
Indian Prime Minister Narendra Modi receives a guard of honour during his visit to Kazakhstan in July 2015.

=== Central ===
Kazakhstan

India is working towards developing strong relations with this resource-rich Central Asian country. The Indian oil company, Oil and Natural Gas Corporation, has got oil exploration and petroleum development grants in Kazakhstan. The two countries are collaborating in petrochemicals, information technology, and space technology. Kazakhstan has offered India five blocks for oil and gas exploration. India and Kazakhstan are to set up joint projects in construction, minerals, and metallurgy. India also signed four other pacts, including an extradition treaty, in the presence of President Prathibha Patil and her Kazakh counterpart Nursultan Nazarbayev. Kazakhstan will provide Uranium and related products under the MoU between Nuclear Power Corp. of India and Kazatomprom. This MoU also opens possibilities of joint exploration of uranium in Kazakhstan, which has the world's second-largest reserves, and India building atomic power plants in the Central Asian country.

Kyrgyzstan

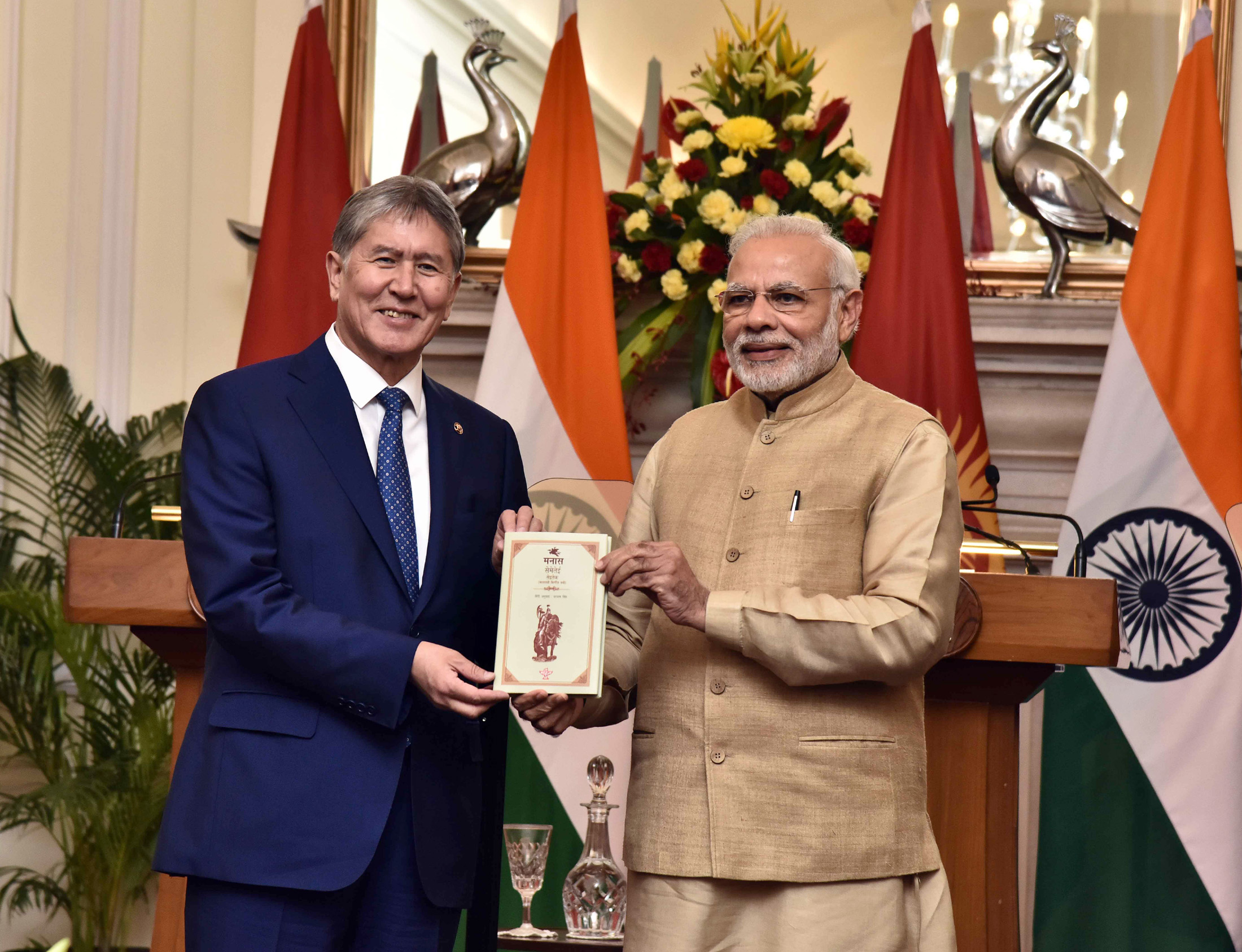
Kyrgyz President Almazbek Atambayev presents a copy of Manas-Semetei-Seitek to Indian Prime Minister Shri Narendra Modi at Hyderabad House, in New Delhi on 20 December 2016.

Tajikistan

Diplomatic relations were established between India and Tajikistan following Tajikistan's independence from the 1991 dissolution of the Soviet Union, which had been friendly with India. Tajikistan occupies a strategically important position in Central Asia, bordering Afghanistan, the People's Republic of China, and separated by a small strip of Afghan territory from Pakistan. India's role in fighting the Taliban and Al-Qaeda and its strategic rivalry with both China and Pakistan have made its ties with Tajikistan important to its strategic and security policies. Despite their common efforts, bilateral trade has been comparatively low, valued at US$12.09 million in 2005; India's exports to Tajikistan were valued at US$6.2 million and its imports at US$5.89 million. India's military presence and activities have been significant, beginning with India's extensive support of the anti-Taliban Afghan Northern Alliance (ANA). India began renovating the Farkhor Air Base and stationed aircraft of the Indian Air Force there. The Farkhor Air Base became fully operational in 2006, and 12 MiG-29 bombers and trainer aircraft are planned to be stationed there.

Turkmenistan

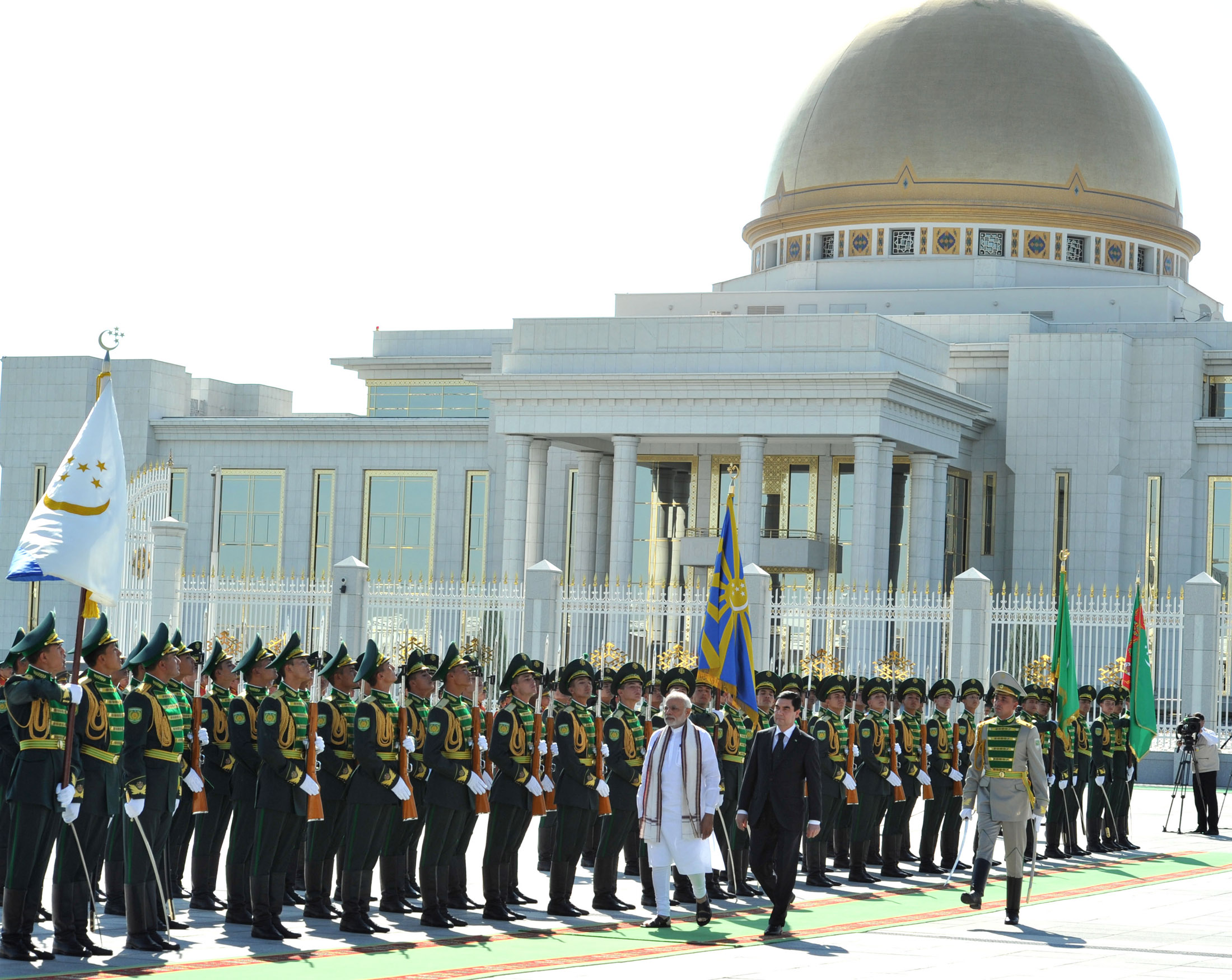
Prime Minister Narendra Modi in Turkmenistan

Uzbekistan

India has an embassy in Tashkent. Uzbekistan has an embassy in New Delhi. Uzbekistan has had a great impact on Indian culture, mostly due to the Mughal Empire, which was founded by Babur of Ferghana (in present-day Uzbekistan) who created his empire southward first in Afghanistan and then in India.

=== East ===
China

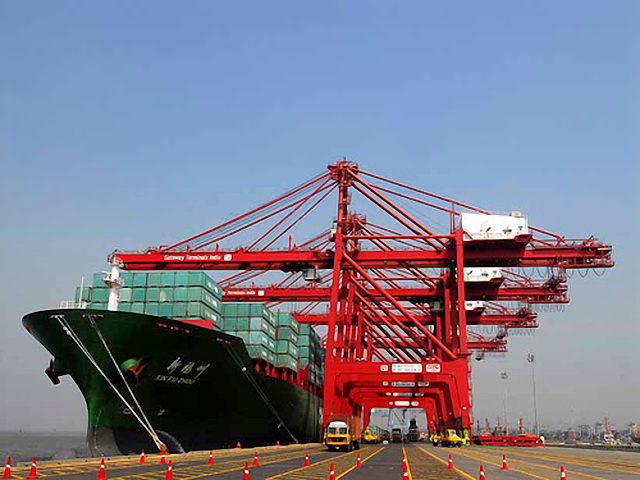
A Chinese container ship unloads cargo at the Jawaharlal Nehru Port in India. Bilateral trade between the two countries had surpassed US$65 billion by 2015, making China the single largest trading partner of India.

Despite lingering suspicions remaining from the 1962 Sino-Indian War, the 1967 Nathu La and Cho La incidents, and continuing boundary disputes over Aksai Chin and Arunachal Pradesh, Sino-Indian relations have improved gradually since 1988. Both countries have sought to reduce tensions along the frontier, expand trade and cultural ties, and normalise relations. A series of high-level visits between the two nations have helped improve relations. In December 1996, Chinese President Jiang Zemin visited India during a tour of South Asia. While in New Delhi, he signed with the Indian prime minister a series of confidence-building measures for the disputed borders. Sino-Indian relations suffered a brief setback in May 1998 when the Indian Defence Minister justified the country's nuclear tests by citing potential threats from China. However, in June 1999, during the Kargil crisis, then-External Affairs Minister Jaswant Singh visited Beijing and stated that India did not consider China a threat. By 2001, relations between India and China were on the mend, and the two sides handled the move from Tibet to India of the 17th Karmapa in January 2000 with delicacy and tact. In 2003, India formally recognised Tibet as a part of China, and China recognised Sikkim as a formal part of India in 2004.

The Current Prime Minister of India, Narendra Modi and President of China Xi Jinping during 18th BRICS Summit, in New Delhi on September 12, 2026.

Since 2004, the economic rise of both China and India has also helped forge closer relations between the two. Sino-Indian trade reached US$65.47 billion in 2013–14, making China the single largest trading partner of India. The increasing economic reliance between India and China has also bought the two nations closer politically, with both India and China eager to resolve their boundary dispute. They have also collaborated on several issues ranging from WTO's Doha round in 2008 to regional free trade agreement. Similar to Indo-US nuclear deal, India and China have also agreed to cooperate in the field of civilian nuclear energy. However, China's economic interests have clashed with those of India. Both countries are the largest Asian investors in Africa and have competed for control over their large natural resources. There was a tense situation due to the soldiers' stand-off in Doklam, Bhutan, but that was resolved early.

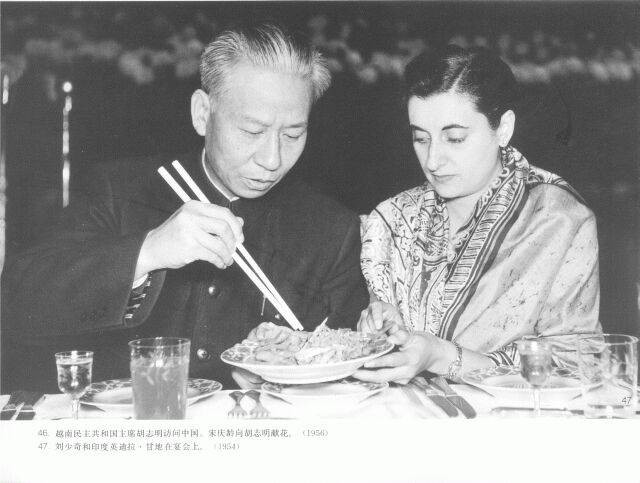
Liu Shaoqi, the then Chairman of the Standing Committee of the National People's Congress with Indira Gandhi when she was the President of Indian National Congress.

Relations were lost due to Galwan Valley skirmishes and its progress. India ceased imports of Chinese products. Various measures were taken, such as several contracts with the Chinese companies involved in railways, networks and several items productions, which were cancelled in response.

The outbreak of the Coronavirus pandemic from Wuhan also hampered the relations. Following the straining of the bonds, both sides blamed each other for the conflict on LAC. On 29–30 August, it was reported that China had allegedly attempted to cross LAC to attain important hilltops, which was filed by Indian troops, as they were an advantage of acquiring important tops near LAC. India banned more than 250 Chinese apps, and on 16 October, it banned the import of ACs, Refrigerators and Coolers from China. Several core commanders' negotiations and talks were held, which resulted in nothing other than vague promises then. Cross-media blaming was common.

There was even a conference held in Moscow, Russia, on 5 September between the Defence Minister of India, Rajnath Singh and Chinese Army General, Wei Fenghe, but that also ended up with no success. The recent meeting of the Quad-alliance was also questioned by China, but was then downed by India.

In mid-January 2021, it was reported that both countries had finally agreed upon the de-escalation from their positions. Footage of Chinese troops removing tents/barracks was released. Both countries also agreed that India would move back to Finger-3, while China retained its position back to Finger-8, and also declared the area from Finger-3 to Finger-8 to be "No man's land".

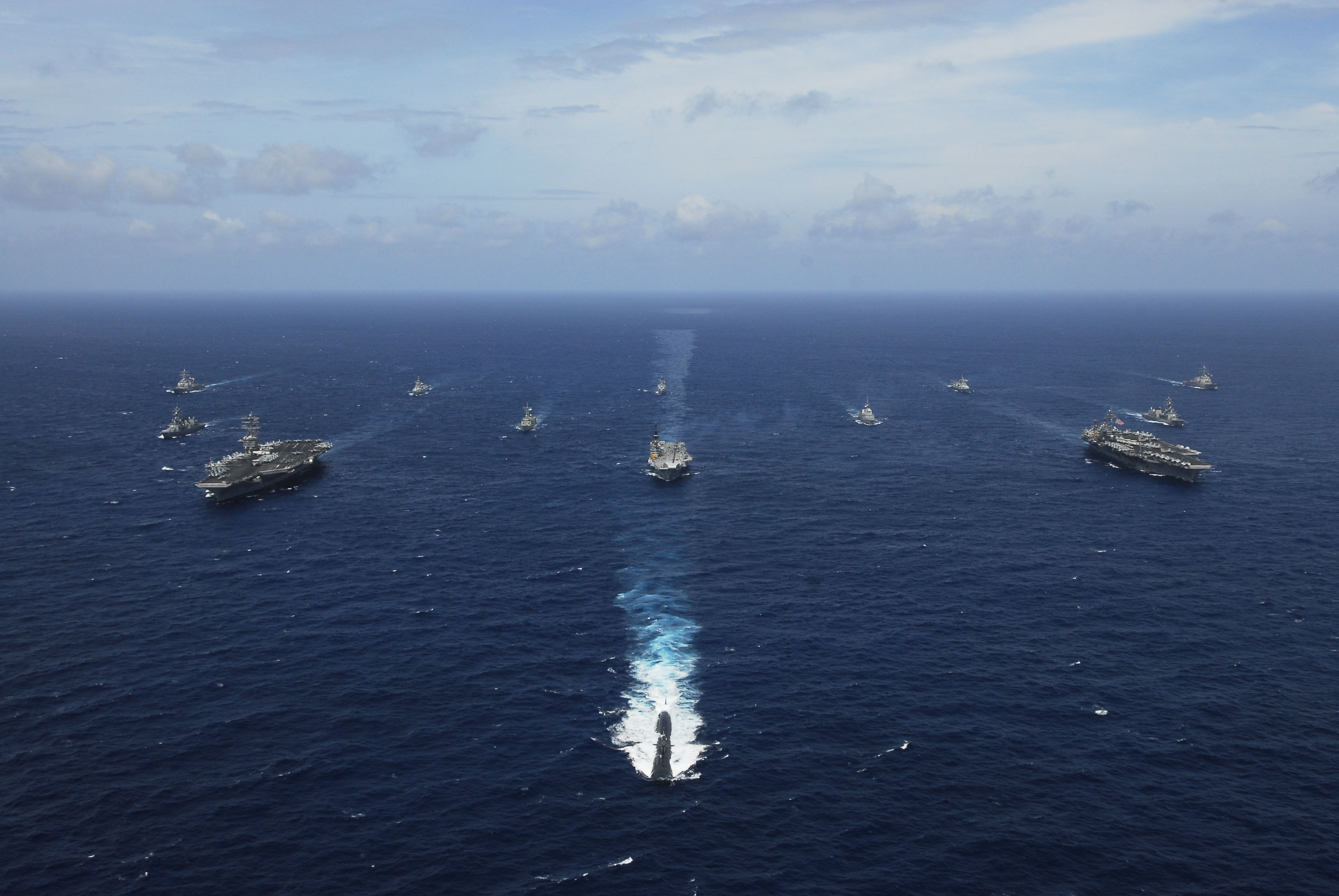
Two Japanese Naval warships took part in Malabar 2007 off India's western coast, one of the few such multilateral exercises Japan has ever taken part in symbolising close military cooperation between India and Japan.

Japan

India-Japan relations have always been strong. India has culturally influenced Japan through Buddhism. During World War II, the Imperial Japanese Army helped Netaji Subhash Chandra Bose's Indian National Army. Relations have remained warm since India's independence, despite Japan imposing sanctions on India after the 1998 Pokhran-II nuclear tests (the sanctions were removed in 2001). Japanese companies, like Sony, Toyota, and Honda, have manufacturing facilities in India, and with the growth of the Indian economy, India is a big market for Japanese firms. The most prominent Japanese company to have a big investment in India is the automobile giant Suzuki, which is in partnership with Indian automobile company Maruti Suzuki, the largest car manufacturer in India. Honda was also a partner in "Hero Honda", one of the largest motorcycle sellers in the world (the companies split in 2011).

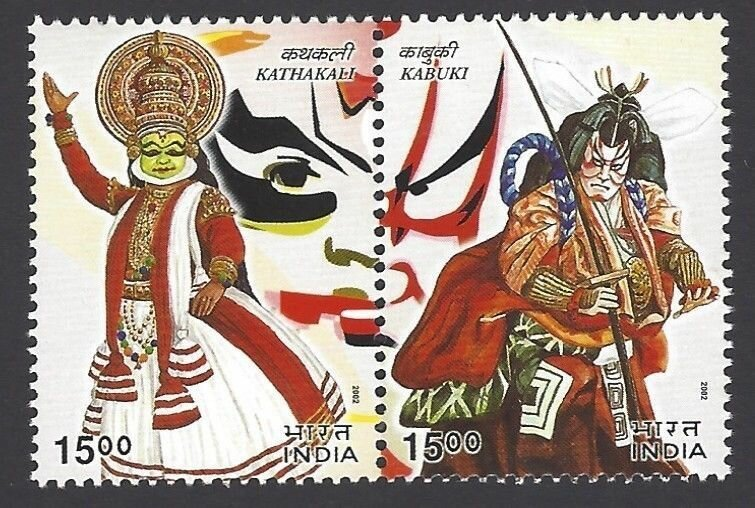
Stamp of India - 2002 - Colnect 834423 - India Japan 50th Anniversary Diplomatic Relations

According to Former Prime Minister Shinzō Abe's arc of freedom theory, it is in Japan's interests to develop closer ties with India, the world's most populous democracy, while its relations with China remain chilly. To this end, Japan has funded many infrastructure projects in India, most notably in New Delhi's metro subway system. In December 2006, then Prime Minister Manmohan Singh's visit to Japan culminated in the signing of the "Joint Statement Towards Japan-India Strategic and Global Partnership". Indian applicants were welcomed in 2006 to the JET Programme, starting with just one slot available in 2006 and 41 in 2007. Also, in 2007, the Japan Self-Defense Forces took part in a naval exercise in the Indian Ocean, known as Malabar 2007, which also involved the naval forces of India, Australia, Singapore and the United States.

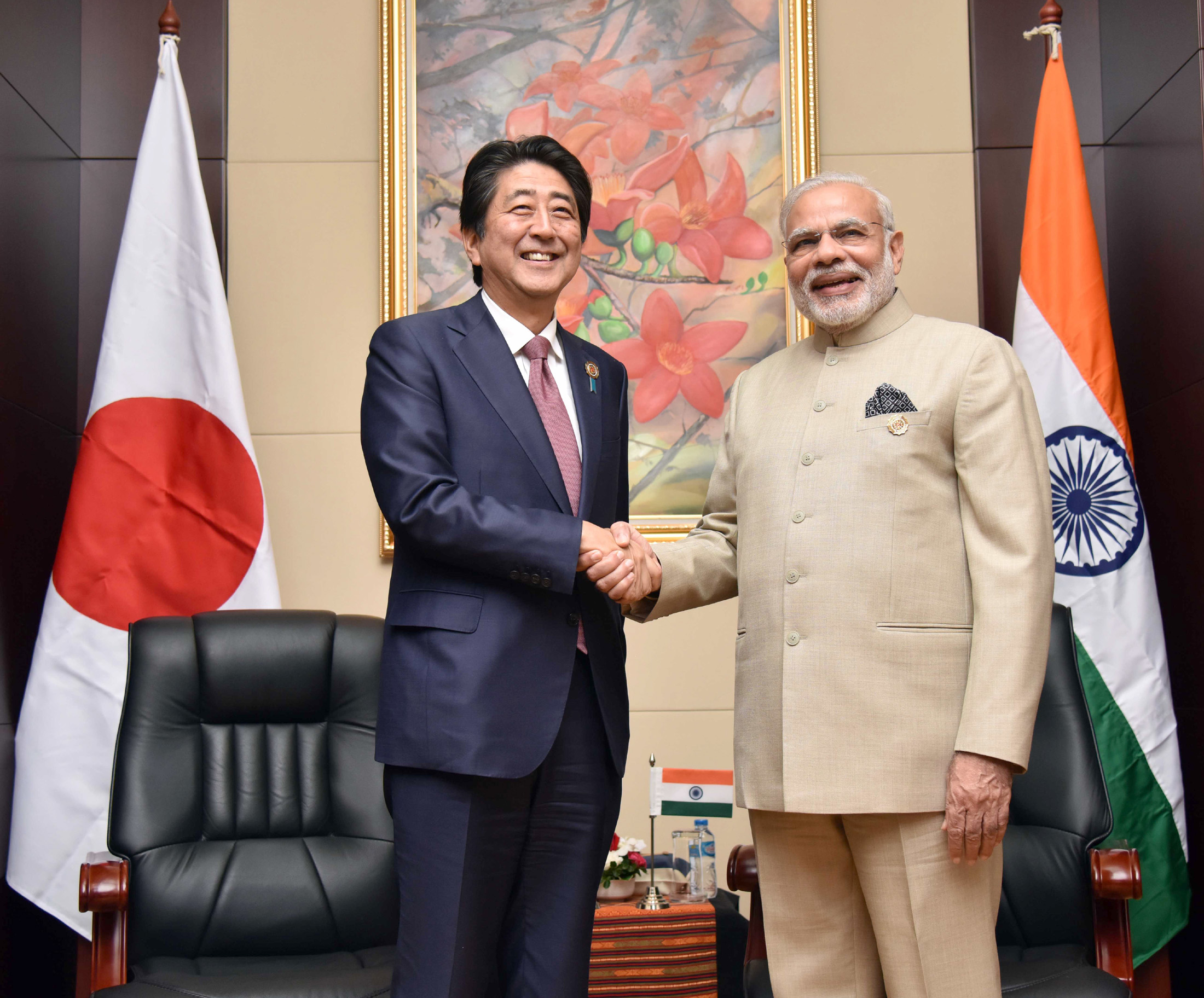
Former PM Shinzo Abe and PM Narendra Modi

In October 2008, Japan signed an agreement with India under which it would grant the latter a low-interest loan worth US$4.5 billion to construct a high-speed rail line between Delhi and Mumbai. This is the single largest overseas project being financed by Japan and reflects a growing economic partnership between the two. India and Japan signed a security cooperation agreement in which both will hold military exercises, police the Indian Ocean and conduct military-to-military exchanges on fighting terrorism, making India one of only three countries, the other two being the United States and Australia, with which Japan has such a security pact. There are 25,000 Indians in Japan as of 2008.

As part of the India- Japan trade agreement review in August 2026, Commerce Minister Piyush Goyal noted India's intention to negotiate increased exports of basmati rice and processed food products.

Mongolia

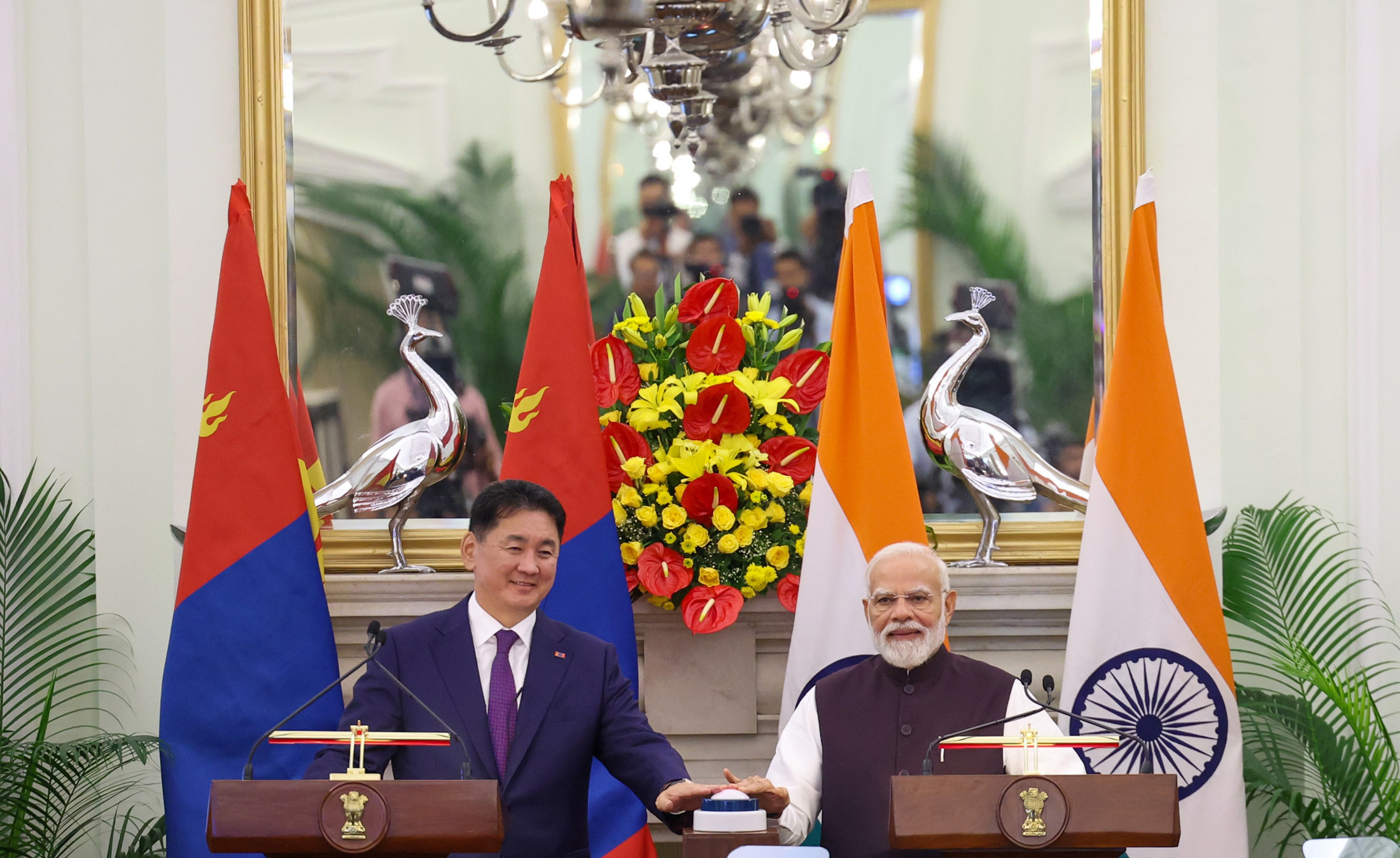
PM Narendra Modi and the President of Mongolia, Khurelsukh Ukhnaa witnessing the Exchange of MoUs between India and Mongolia.

The relations between India and Mongolia are still at a nascent stage, and Indo-Mongolian cooperation is limited to diplomatic visits, the provision of soft loans and financial aid, and collaborations in the IT sector.

India established diplomatic relations in December 1955. India was the first country outside the Soviet bloc to establish diplomatic relations with Mongolia. Since then, there have been treaties of mutual friendship and cooperation between the two countries in 1973, 1994, 2001 and 2004.

North Korea

India and North Korea have growing trade and diplomatic relations. India had a fully functioning embassy in Pyongyang, which was closed down due to the COVID-19 pandemic in the host country while North Korea still operates an embassy in New Delhi. India has said that it wants the "reunification" of Korea.

South Korea

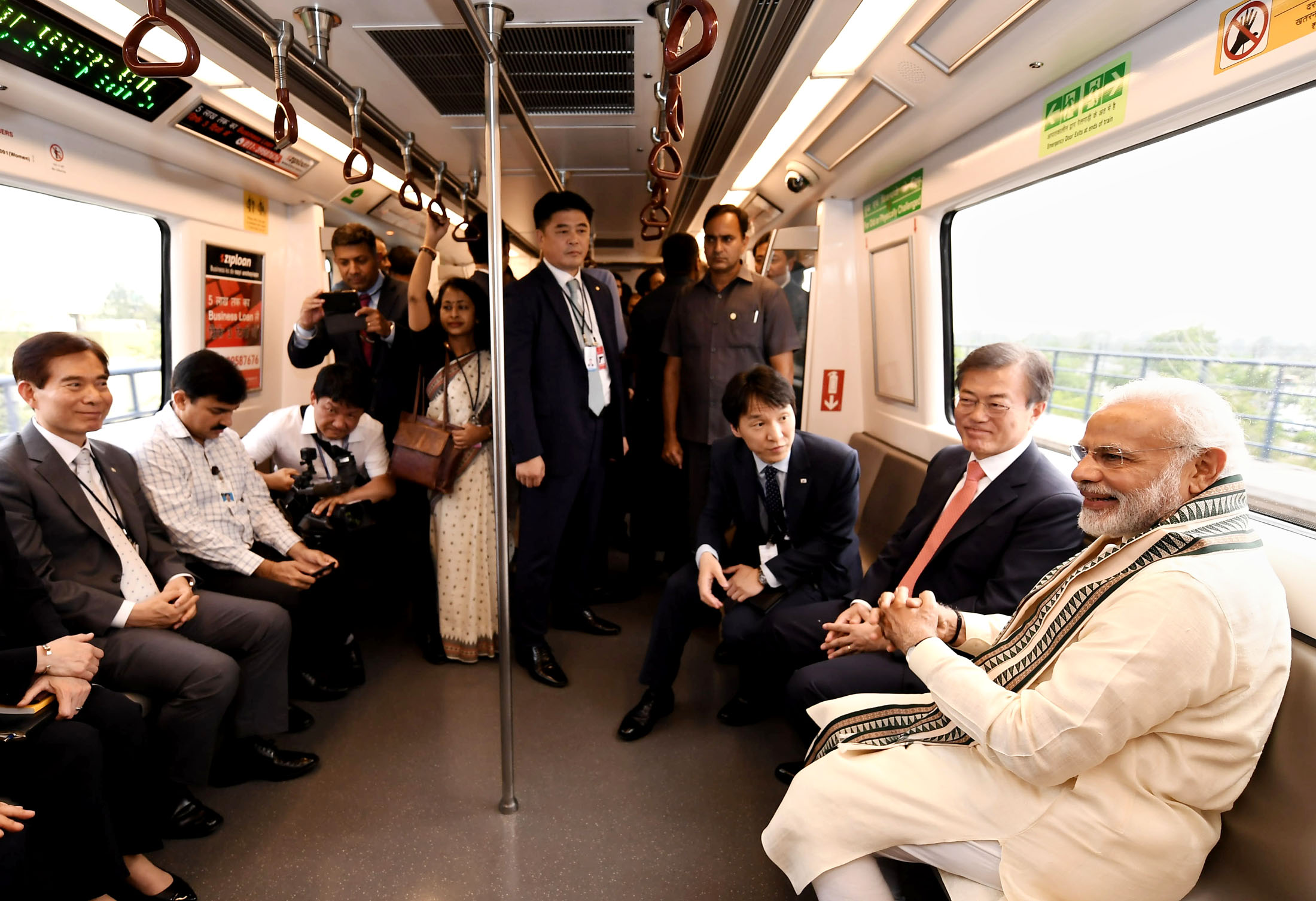
The Prime Minister, Shri Narendra Modi and the President of the Republic of South Korea, Mr. Moon Jae-in take Delhi Metro ride on the way to inaugurate the Samsung manufacturing plant, World's Largest Mobile Factory, in Noida, Uttar Pradesh.

The cordial relationship between the two countries extends back to 48AD, when Queen Suro, or Princess Heo, travelled from the kingdom of Ayodhya to Korea. According to the Samguk Yusa, the princess had a dream about a heavenly king who was awaiting heaven's anointed ride. After Princess Heo had the dream, she asked her parents, the king and queen, for permission to set out and seek the man, which the king and queen urged with the belief that god orchestrated the whole fate. Upon approval, she set out on a boat, carrying gold, silver, a tea plant, and a stone which calmed the waters. Archeologists discovered a stone with two fish kissing each other, a symbol of the Gaya kingdom that is unique to the Mishra royal family in Ayodhya, India. This royal link provides further evidence that there was an active commercial engagement between India and Korea since the queen's arrival in Korea. Current descendants live in the city of Gimhae as well as abroad in the American states of New Jersey and Kentucky. Many of them became prominent and well known around the world, like President Kim Dae Jung and Prime Minister Kim Jong-pil. The relations between the countries have been relatively limited, although much progress has been made during the three decades.

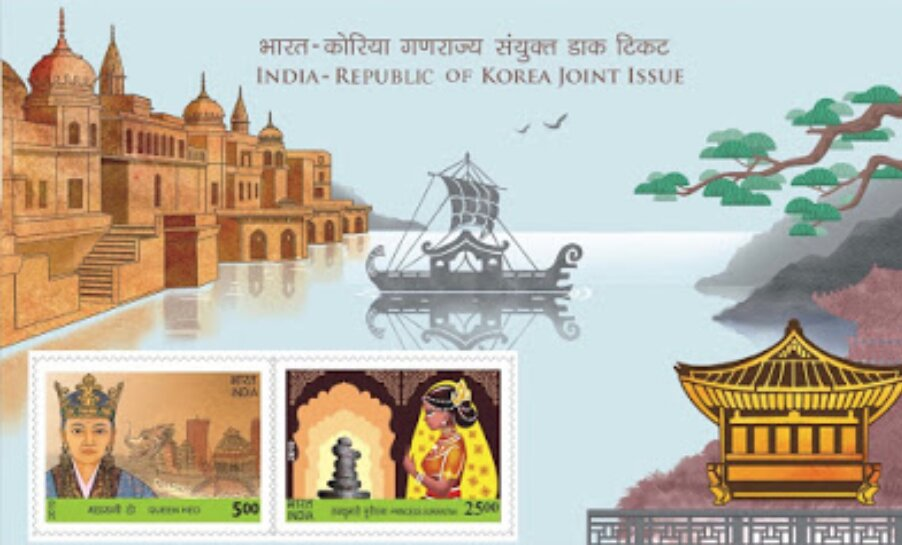
Stamp of India - 2019 - Joint Issue with South Korea commemorating relationship when Queen Suro, or Princess Heo, travelled from the kingdom of Ayodhya to Korea.

Since the formal establishment of diplomatic ties between the two countries in 1973, several trade agreements have been reached. Trade between the two nations has increased exponentially, exemplified by the $530 million during the fiscal year of 1992–1993, and the $10 billion during 2006–2007. During the 1997 Asian financial crisis, South Korean businesses sought to increase access to the global markets and began trade investments with India. The last two presidential visits from South Korea to India were in 1996 and 2006, and the embassy works between the two countries are seen as needing improvements. Recently, there have been acknowledgements in the Korean public and political spheres that expanding relations with India should be a major economic and political priority for South Korea. Much of the economic investments of South Korea have been drained into China; However, South Korea is currently the fifth largest source of investment in India. To The Times of India, President Roh Moo-hyun voiced his opinion that cooperation between India's software and Korea's IT industries would bring very efficient and successful outcomes. The two countries agreed to shift their focus to the revision of the visa policies between the two countries, expansion of trade, and establishment of a free trade agreement to encourage further investment between the two countries. Korean companies such as LG, Hyundai and Samsung have established manufacturing and service facilities in India, and several Korean construction companies won grants for a portion of the many infrastructural building plans in India, such as the "National Highway Development Project". Tata Motor's purchase of Daewoo Commercial Vehicles at the cost of $102 million highlights India's investments in Korea, which consist mostly of subcontracting.

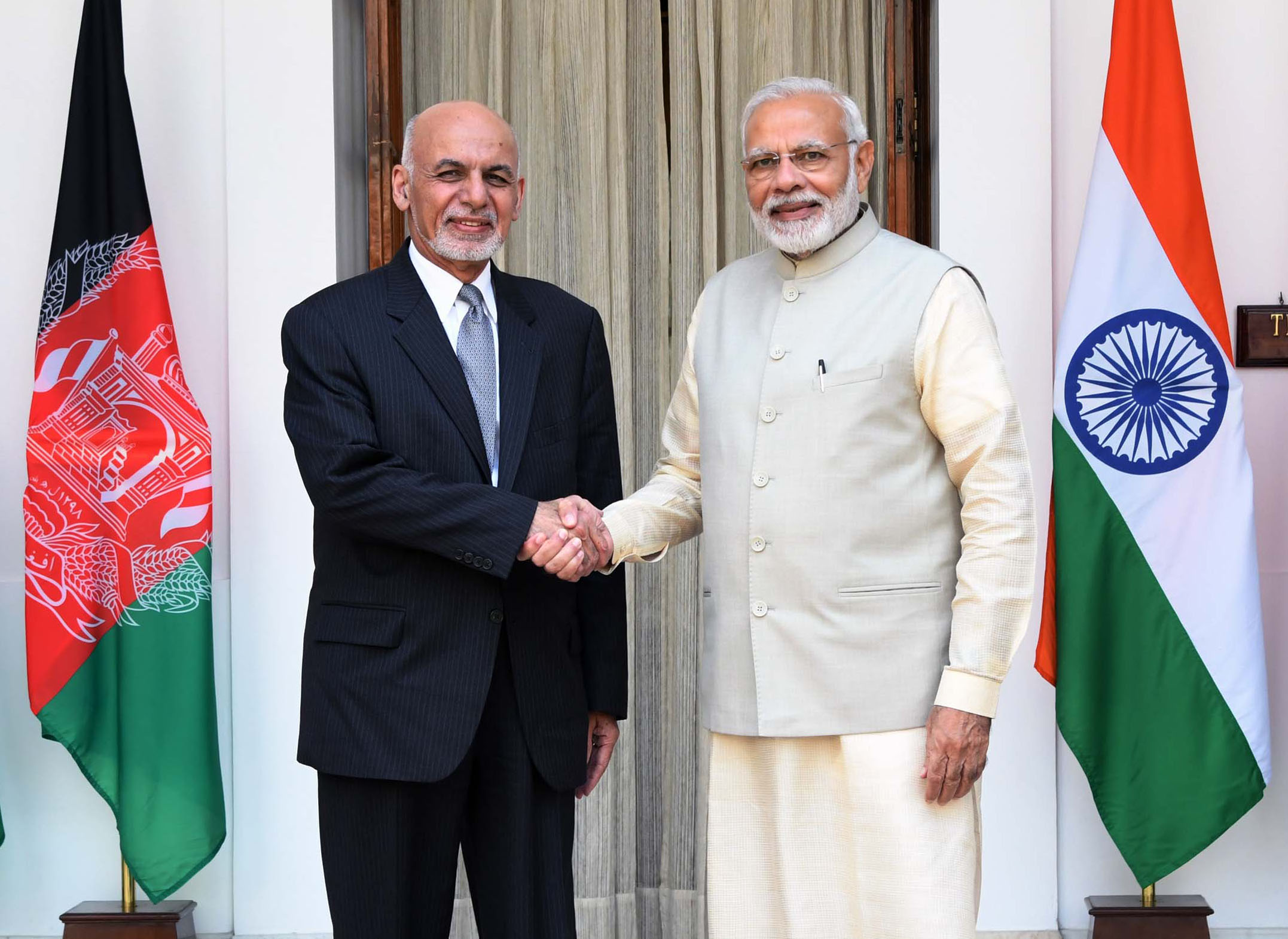
Indian PM Narendra Modi, hosting President of Afghanistan, Ashraf Ghani, in New Delhi (2018)

=== South ===
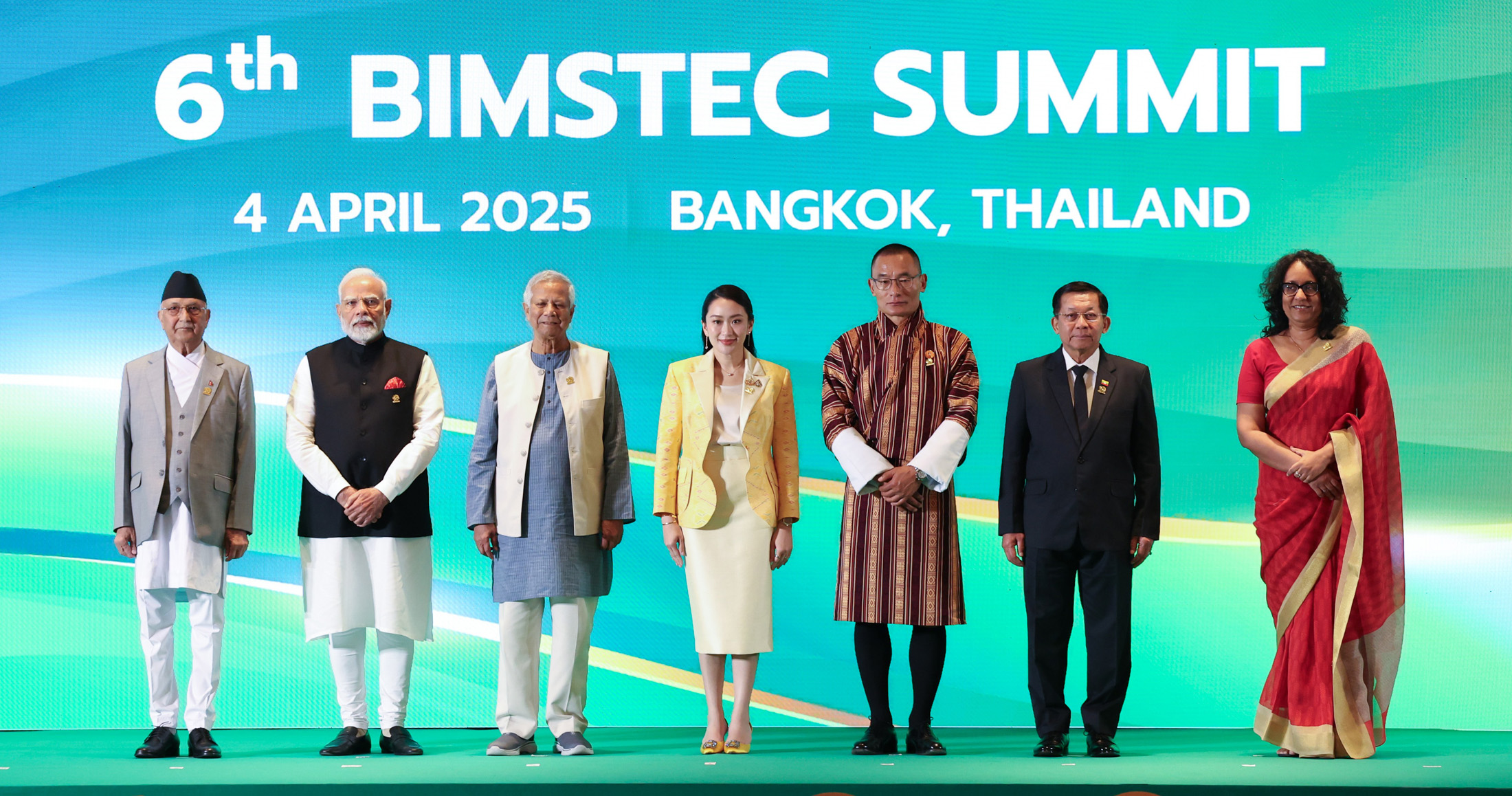
PM Narendra Modi with Bimstec and South Asian leaders during the 6th BIMSTEC Summit at Bangkok, in Thailand on April 04, 2025.

Afghanistan

Both countries established diplomatic relations on 10 December 1947.

Bilateral relations between India and Afghanistan have been traditionally strong and friendly. While India was the only South Asian country to recognise the Soviet-backed Democratic Republic of Afghanistan in the 1980s, its relations were diminished during the Afghan civil wars and the rule of the Islamist Taliban in the 1990s. India aided the overthrow of the Taliban and became the largest regional provider of humanitarian and reconstruction aid. The new democratically elected Afghan government strengthened its ties with India in the wake of persisting tensions and problems with Pakistan, which is continuing to shelter and support the Taliban. India pursues a policy of close cooperation to bolster its standing as a regional power and contains its rival Pakistan, which it maintains is supporting Islamic militants in Kashmir and other parts of India. India is the largest regional investor in Afghanistan, having committed more than US$3 billion for reconstruction purposes. After the Islamic Republic of Afghanistan collapsed, India participated in the evacuation of non-Muslim minorities and provided food aid to Taliban-ruled Afghanistan.

Bangladesh

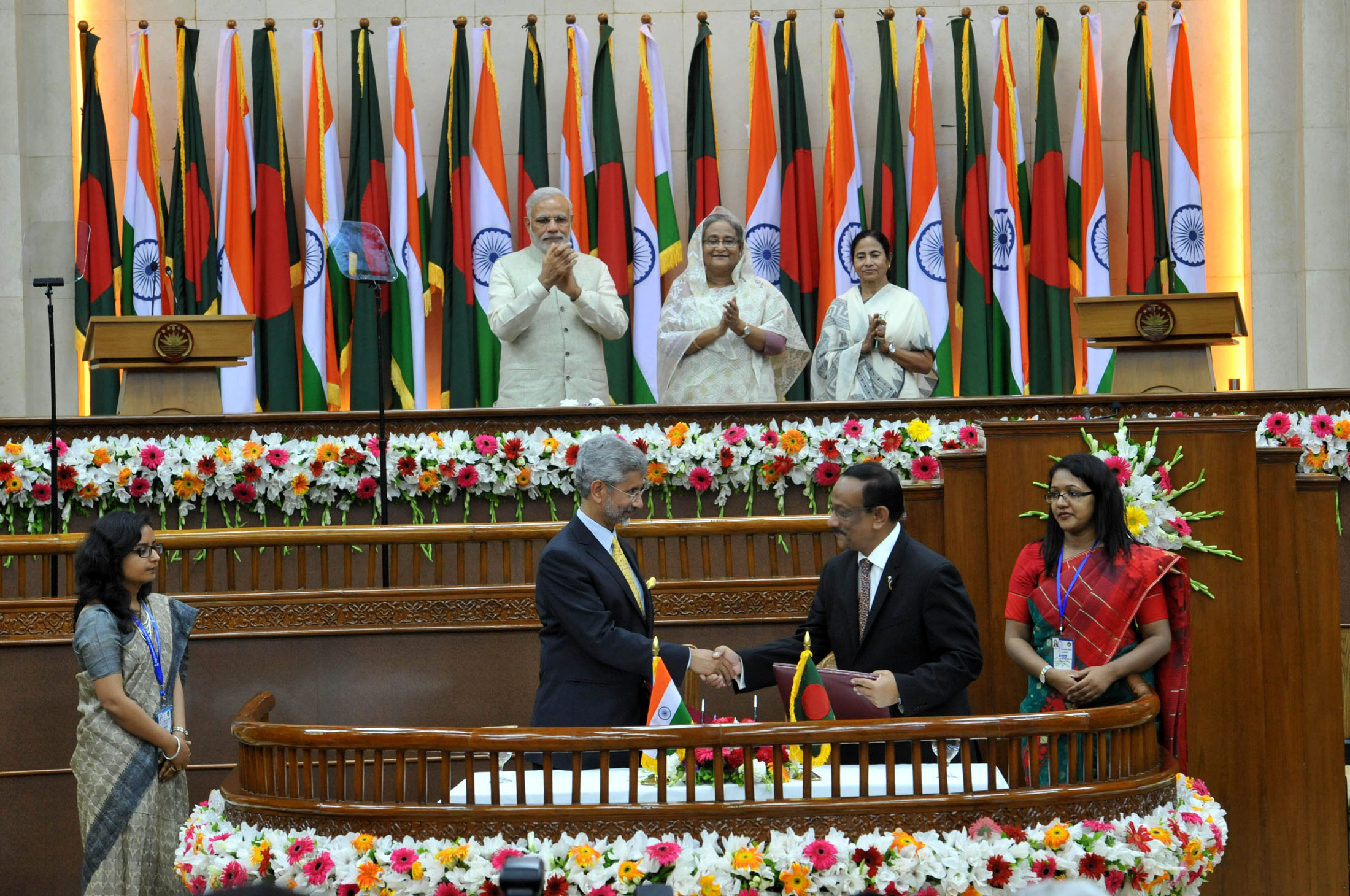
PM Narendra Modi, along with PM of Bangladesh, Sheikh Hasina, and Chief Minister of West Bengal, Mamata Banerjee, in an agreement between Indian and Bangladeshi Government, with Minister of External Affairs (India), S. Jaishankar, and Bangladesh Govt. officials

India was the second country to recognise Bangladesh as a separate and independent state, doing so on 6 December 1971. India fought alongside the Bangladeshis to liberate Bangladesh from West Pakistan in 1971.

Bangladesh's relationship with India has been difficult in terms of border killings, irrigation and land border disputes post-1976. However, India has enjoyed a favourable relationship with Bangladesh during governments formed by the Awami League in 1972 and 1996. The recent solutions to land and maritime disputes have taken out irritants in ties.

At the outset, India's relations with Bangladesh could not have been stronger because of India's unalloyed support for independence and opposition against Pakistan in 1971. During the independence war, many refugees fled to India. When the struggle of resistance matured in November 1971, India also intervened militarily and may have helped bring international attention to the issue through Indira Gandhi's visit to Washington, D.C. Afterwards, India furnished relief and reconstruction aid. India extended recognition to Bangladesh before the end of the war in 1971 (the second country to do so after Bhutan) and subsequently lobbied others to follow suit. India also withdrew its military from the land of Bangladesh when Sheikh Mujibur Rahman requested Indira Gandhi to do so during the latter's visit to Dhaka in 1972.

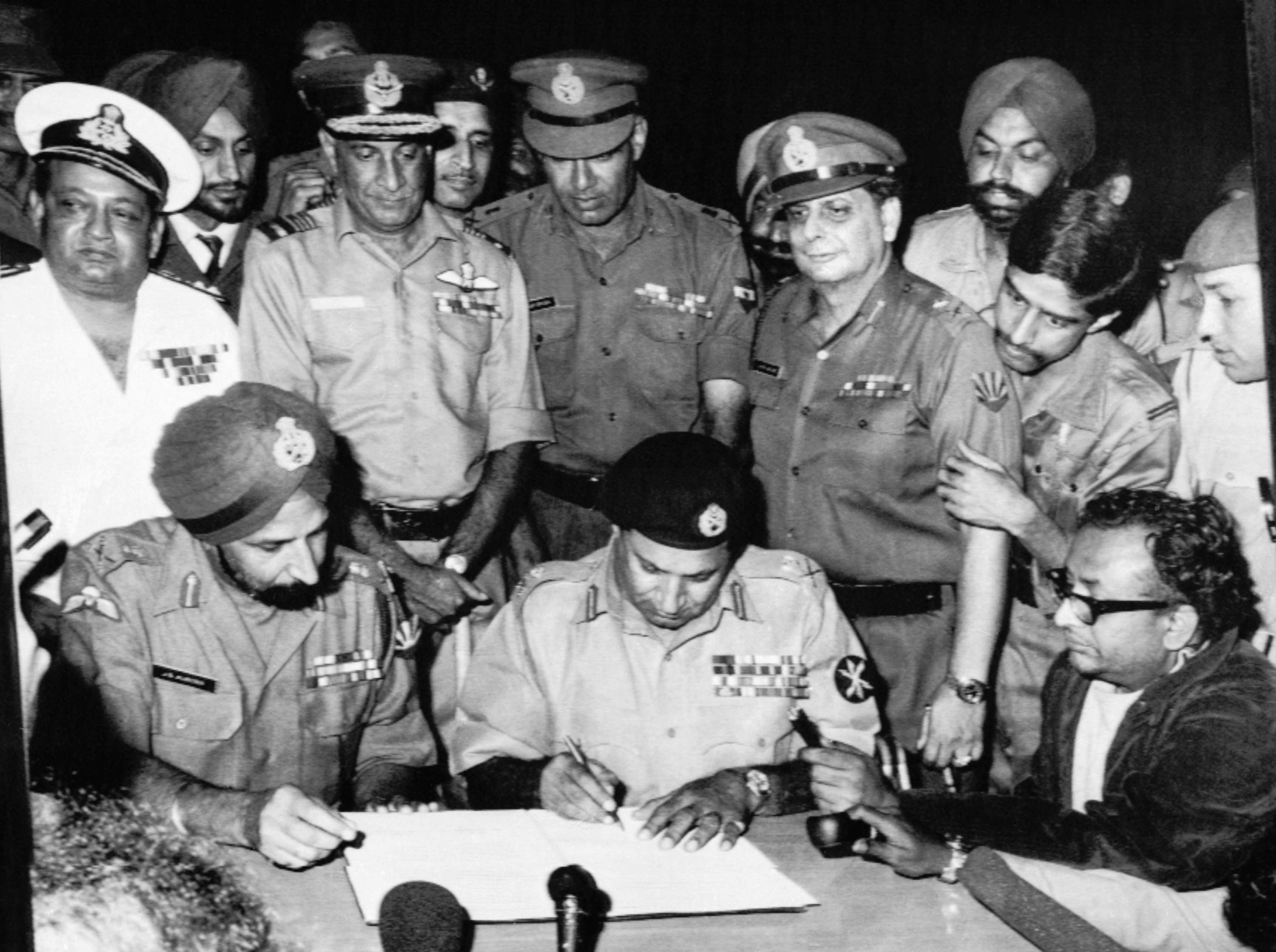
Lt Gen Niazi signing the Instrument of Surrender under the gaze of Lt Gen Aurora, effectively ending Bangladesh Liberation War and creating the new state of Bangladesh.

Indo-Bangladesh relations have been somewhat less friendly since the fall of the Mujib government in August 1975. over the years over issues such as South Talpatti Island, the Tin Bigha Corridor and access to Nepal, the Farakka Barrage and water sharing, border conflicts near Tripura and the construction of a fence along most of the border which India explains as security provision against migrants, insurgents and terrorists. Many Bangladeshis feel India likes to play "big brother" to smaller neighbours, including Bangladesh. Bilateral relations warmed in 1996, due to a softer Indian foreign policy and the new Awami League Government. A 30-year water-sharing agreement for the Ganges River was signed in December 1996, after an earlier bilateral water-sharing agreement for the Ganges River lapsed in 1988. Both nations also have cooperated on the issue of flood warnings and preparedness. The Bangladesh Government and tribal insurgents signed a peace accord in December 1997, which allowed for the return of tribal refugees who had fled to India, beginning in 1986, to escape violence caused by an insurgency in their homeland in the Chittagong Hill Tracts. The Bangladesh Army maintains a very strong presence in the area to this day. The army is increasingly concerned about the growing problem of the cultivation of illegal drugs.

There are also small pieces of land along the border region that Bangladesh is diplomatically trying to reclaim. Padua, part of Sylhet Division before 1971, has been under Indian control since the war in 1971. This small strip of land was re-occupied by the BDR in 2001 but later given back to India after the Bangladesh government decided to solve the problem through diplomatic negotiations. The Indian New Moore island no longer exists, but Bangladesh repeatedly claims it to be part of the Satkhira district of Bangladesh.

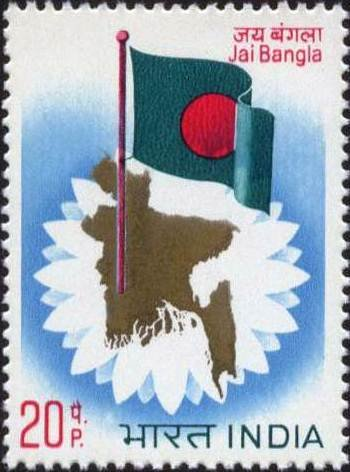
Stamp of India - 1973- Flower with Flag - India commemorating the creation of Republic of Bangladesh.

In recent years, India has increasingly complained that Bangladesh does not secure its border properly. It fears an increasing flow of poor Bangladeshis, and it accuses Bangladesh of harbouring Indian separatist groups like ULFA and alleged terrorist groups. The Bangladesh government has refused to accept these allegations. India estimates that over 20 million Bangladeshis are living illegally in India. One Bangladeshi official responded that "there is not a single Bangladeshi migrant in India". Since 2002, India has been constructing an India – Bangladesh Fence along much of the 2500-mile border. The failure to resolve migration disputes bears a human cost for illegal migrants, such as imprisonment and health risks (namely HIV/AIDS).

India's prime minister Narendra Modi and his Bangladeshi counterpart Sheikh Hasina have completed a landmark deal redrawing their messy shared border and thereby solving disputes between India and Bangladesh. Bangladesh has also given India a transit route to travel through Bangladesh to its North East states. India and Bangladesh also have a free trade agreement on 7 June 2015.

Both countries solved their border dispute on 6 June 2015.

The Agartala-Akhaura rail link between Indian Railways and Bangladesh Railways will reduce the current 1700 km road distance between Kolkata and Agartala via Siliguri to just 350 kilometres by railway. To connect Kolkata with Tripura via Bangladesh through railway, the Union Government on 10 February 2016 sanctioned about 580 crore rupees. The project, which is expected to be completed by 2017, will pass through Bangladesh.

The project ranks high on Prime Minister's 'Act East Policy', and is expected to increase connectivity and boost trade between India and Bangladesh.

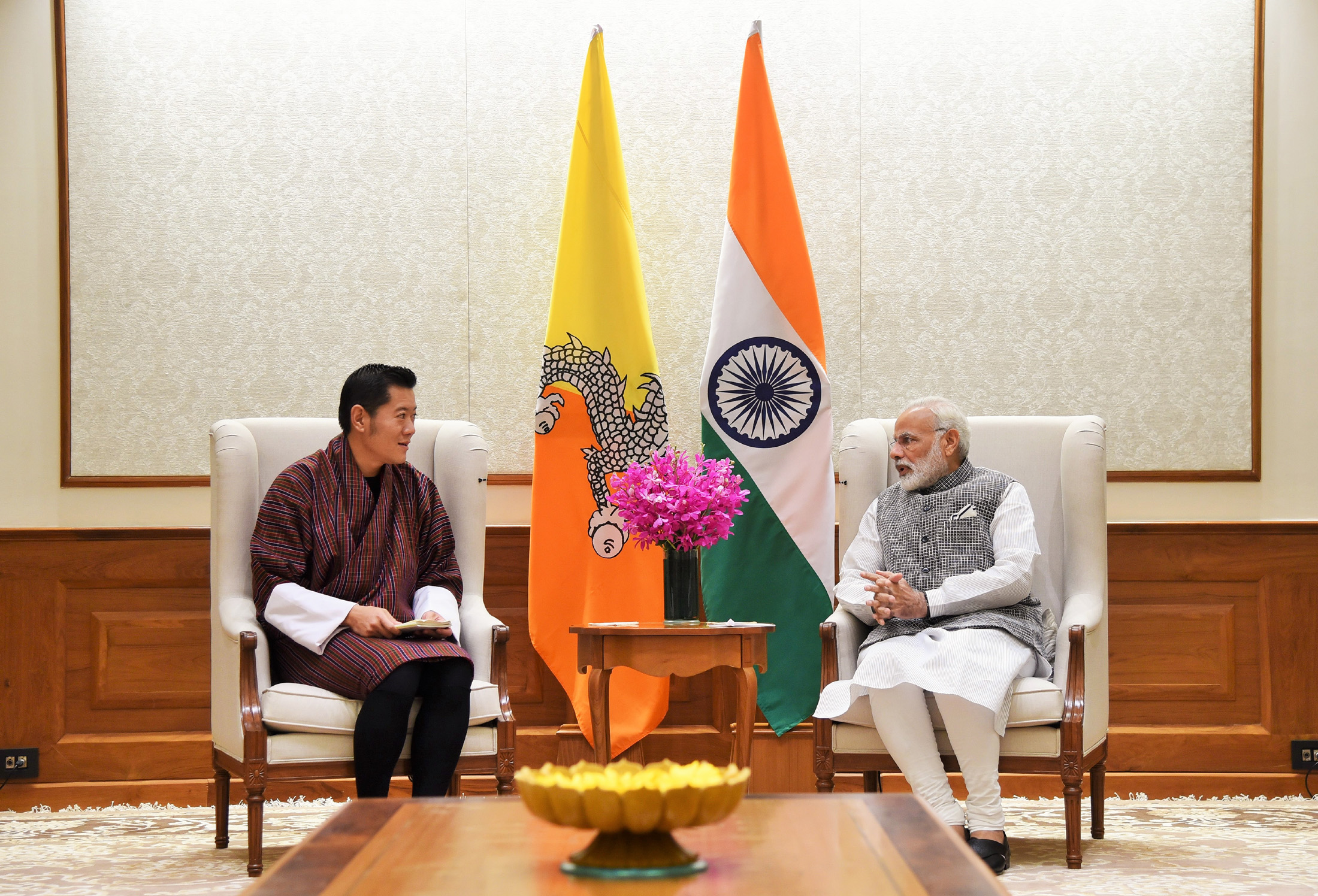
The King of Bhutan, Jigme Khesar Namgyel Wangchuck, at Prime Minister's Residence with PM Narendra Modi in New Delhi on 1 November 2017.

Bhutan

Historically, there have been close ties with India. Both countries signed a friendship treaty in 1949, where India would assist Bhutan in foreign relations. On 8 February 2007, the Indo-Bhutan Friendship Treaty was substantially revised under the Bhutanese King, Jigme Khesar Namgyel Wangchuck. Whereas in the Treaty of 1949 Article 2 read as "The Government of India undertakes to exercise no interference in the internal administration of Bhutan. On its part, the Government of Bhutan agrees to be guided by the advice of the Government of India regarding its external relations."

In the revised treaty, it now reads as, "In keeping with the abiding ties of close friendship and cooperation between Bhutan and India, the Government of the Kingdom of Bhutan and the Government of the Republic of India shall cooperate closely with each other on issues relating to their national interests. Neither government shall allow the use of its territory for activities harmful to the national security and interest of the other". The revised treaty also includes in it the preamble "Reaffirming their respect for each other's independence, sovereignty and territorial integrity", an element that was absent in the earlier version. The Indo-Bhutan Friendship Treaty of 2007 strengthens Bhutan's status as an independent and sovereign nation.

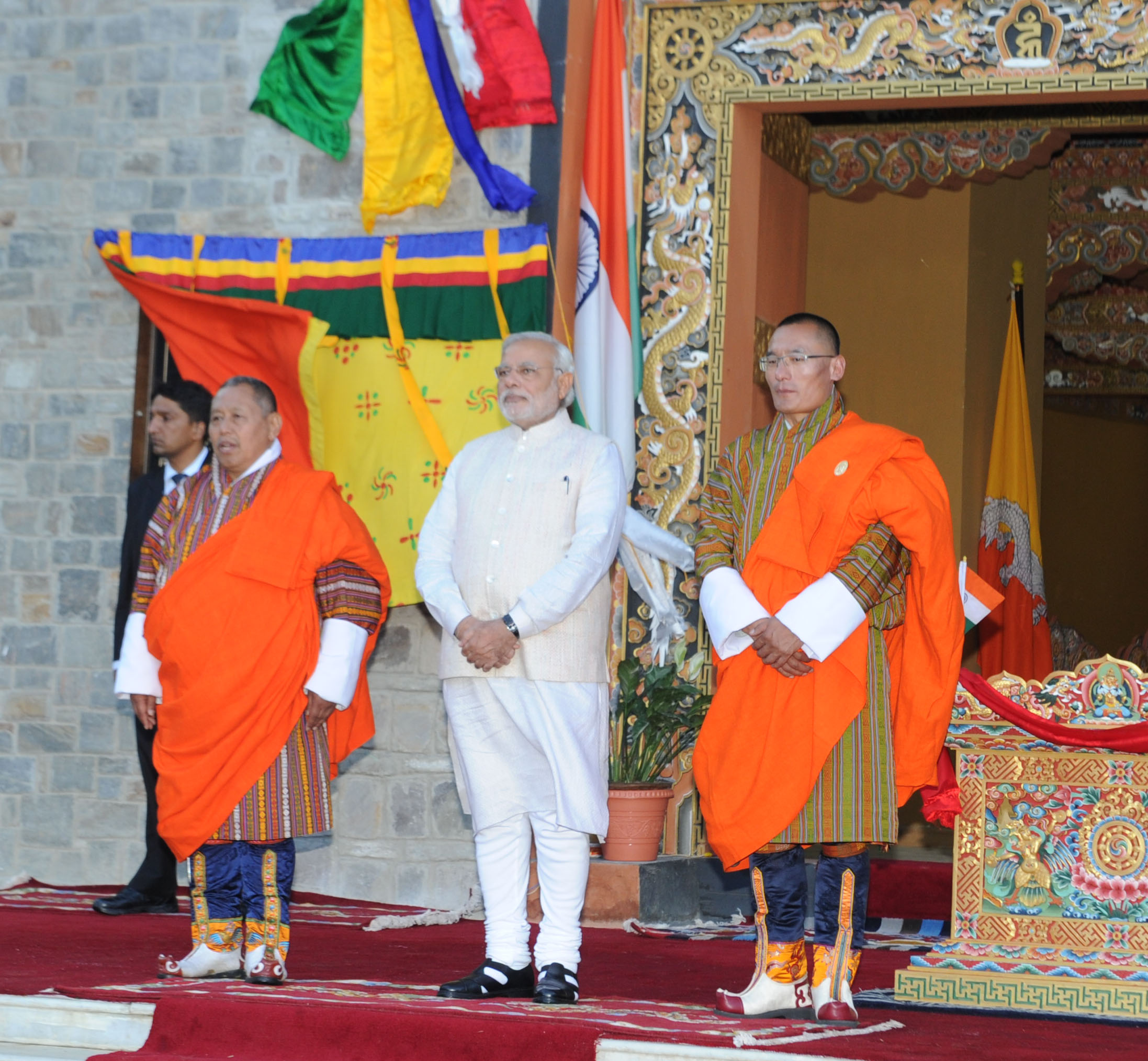
Indian PM Narendra Modi meets with Bhutanese PM Tshering Tobgay

India continues to be the largest trade and development partner of Bhutan. Planned development efforts in Bhutan began in the early 1960s. The First Five Year Plan (FYP) of Bhutan was launched in 1961. Since then, India has been extending financial assistance to Bhutan's FYPs. The 10th FYP ended in June 2013. India's overall assistance to the 10th FYP was a little over Rs. 5000 crores, excluding grants for hydropower projects. India has committed Rs. 4500 crores for Bhutan's 11th FYP along with Rs. 500 crores as an Economic Stimulus Package.

The hydropower sector is one of the main pillars of bilateral cooperation, exemplifying mutually beneficial synergy by providing clean energy to India and exporting revenue to Bhutan (power contributes 14% to the Bhutanese GDP, comprising about 35% of Bhutan's total exports). Three hydroelectric projects (HEPs) totalling 1416 MW (336 MW Chukha HEP, the 60 MW Kurichu HEP, and the 1020 MW Tala HEP) are already exporting electricity to India. In 2008, the two governments identified ten more projects for development with a total generation capacity of 10,000 MW. Of these, three projects totalling 2940 MW (1200 MW Punatsangchu-I, 1020 MW Punatsangchu-II and 720 MW Mangdechu HEPs) are under construction and are scheduled to be commissioned in the last quarter of 2017–2018. Out of the remaining 7 HEPs, 4 projects totalling 2120 MW (600 MW Kholongchhu, 180 MW Bunakha, 570 MW Wangchu and 770 MW Chamkarchu) will be constructed under a Joint Venture model, for which a Framework Inter-Governmental Agreement was signed between both governments in 2014. Of these 4 JV-model projects, pre-construction activities for Kholongchhu HEP have commenced. Tata Power is also building a hydroelectric dam in Bhutan.

India had assisted Bhutan by deploying its troops in Doklam in 2017- a territory claimed and controlled by the Bhutanese government- to resist a Chinese army's control and construction of military structures.

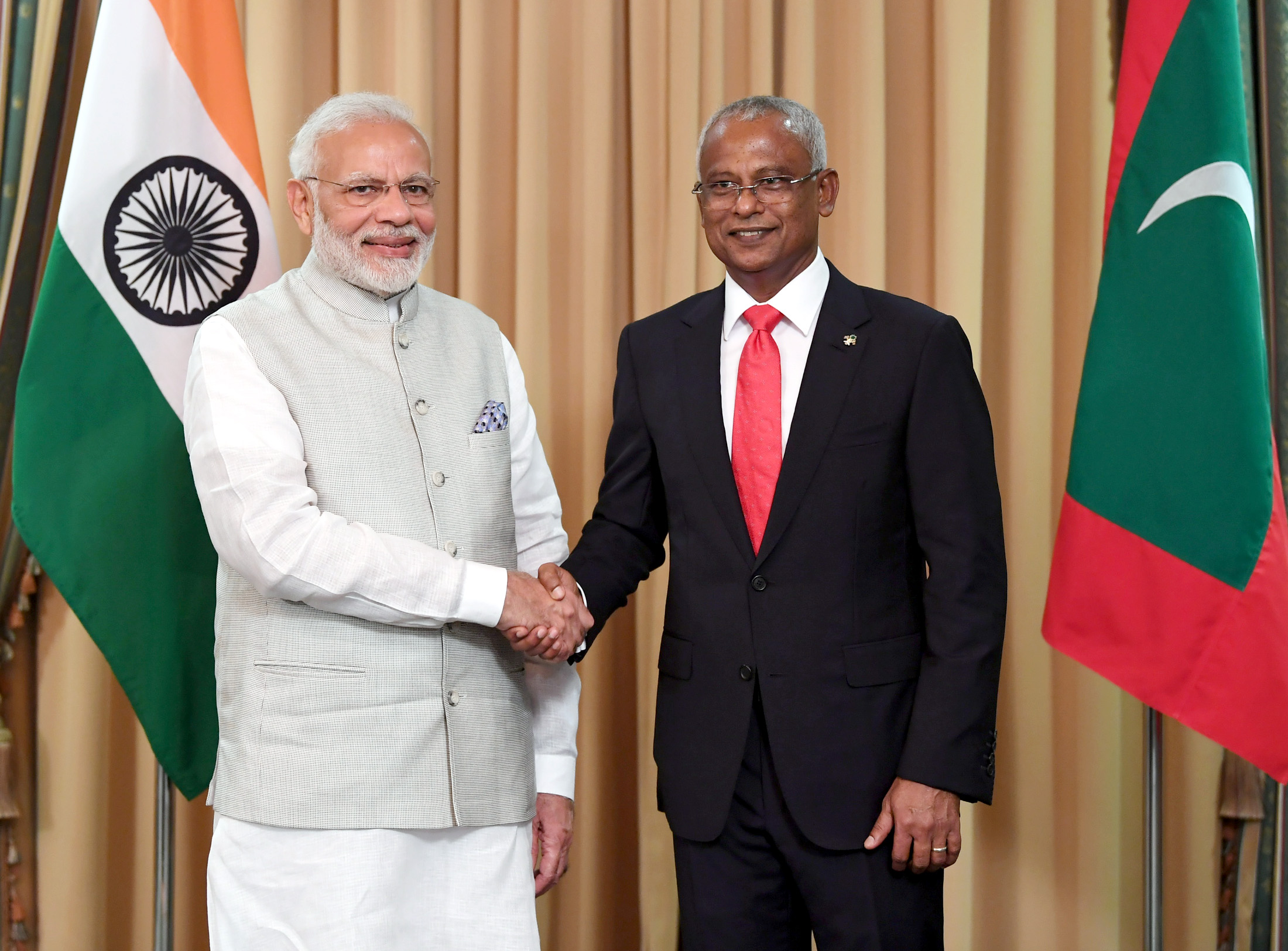
PM Narendra Modi meeting President of Maldives, Ibrahim Mohamed Solih, in Malé (2018)

Maldives

India enjoys a considerable influence over the Maldives' foreign policy and provides extensive security cooperation, especially after Operation Cactus in 1988, during which India repelled Tamil mercenaries who invaded the country.

As a founder member in 1985 of the South Asian Association for Regional Cooperation, SAARC, which brings together Afghanistan, Bangladesh, Bhutan, India, Maldives, Nepal, Pakistan and Sri Lanka, the country plays a very active role in SAARC. The Maldives has taken the lead in calling for a South Asian Free Trade Agreement, the formulation of a Social Charter, the initiation of informal political consultations in SAARC forums, the lobbying for greater action on environmental issues, the proposal of numerous human rights measures such as the regional convention on child rights, and for setting up a SAARC Human Rights Resource Centre. The Maldives is also an advocate of a greater international profile for SAARC, such as through formulating common positions at the UN.

PM Modi receives ceremonial welcome and guard of honour at Malé, in Maldives on July 25, 2025.

India is starting the process to bring the island country into India's security grid. The move comes after the moderate Islamic nation approached New Delhi earlier this year over fears that one of its island resorts could be taken over by terrorists given its lack of military assets and surveillance capabilities. India also signed an agreement with the Maldives in 2011, which is centred around the following:

- India shall permanently base two helicopters in the country to enhance its surveillance capabilities and ability to respond swiftly to threats. One helicopter from the Coast Guard was handed over during A. K. Antony's visit while another from the Navy will be cleared for transfer shortly.
- Maldives has coastal radars on only two of its 26 atolls. India will help set up radars on all 26 for seamless coverage of approaching vessels and aircraft.
- The coastal radar chain in the Maldives will be networked with the Indian coastal radar system. India has already undertaken a project to install radars along its entire coastline. The radar chains of the two countries will be interlinked, and a central control room in India's Coastal Command will get a seamless radar picture.
- The Indian Coast Guard (ICG) will carry out regular Dornier sorties over the island nation to look out for suspicious movements or vessels. The Southern Naval Command will facilitate the inclusion of Maldives into the Indian security grid.
- Military teams from Maldives will visit the tri-services Andaman & Nicobar Command (ANC) to observe how India manages security and surveillance of the critical island chain.

Relations faced a strain in January 2024 due to derogatory remarks by Maldivian officials and concerns over racism, targeted towards Indian prime minister Narendra Modi as well as India, triggering the 2024 India-Maldives diplomatic row.

This was seen very negatively in India, with citizens calling for a boycott of vacations in the Maldives, with many renowned Bollywood actors and personalities criticising the Maldivian government. This also led to the death of a young Maldivian teenager, who had to be taken to India via an air ambulance, after the request at the last minute was denied by Maldivian authorities due to the ongoing tensions against the country.

Nepal

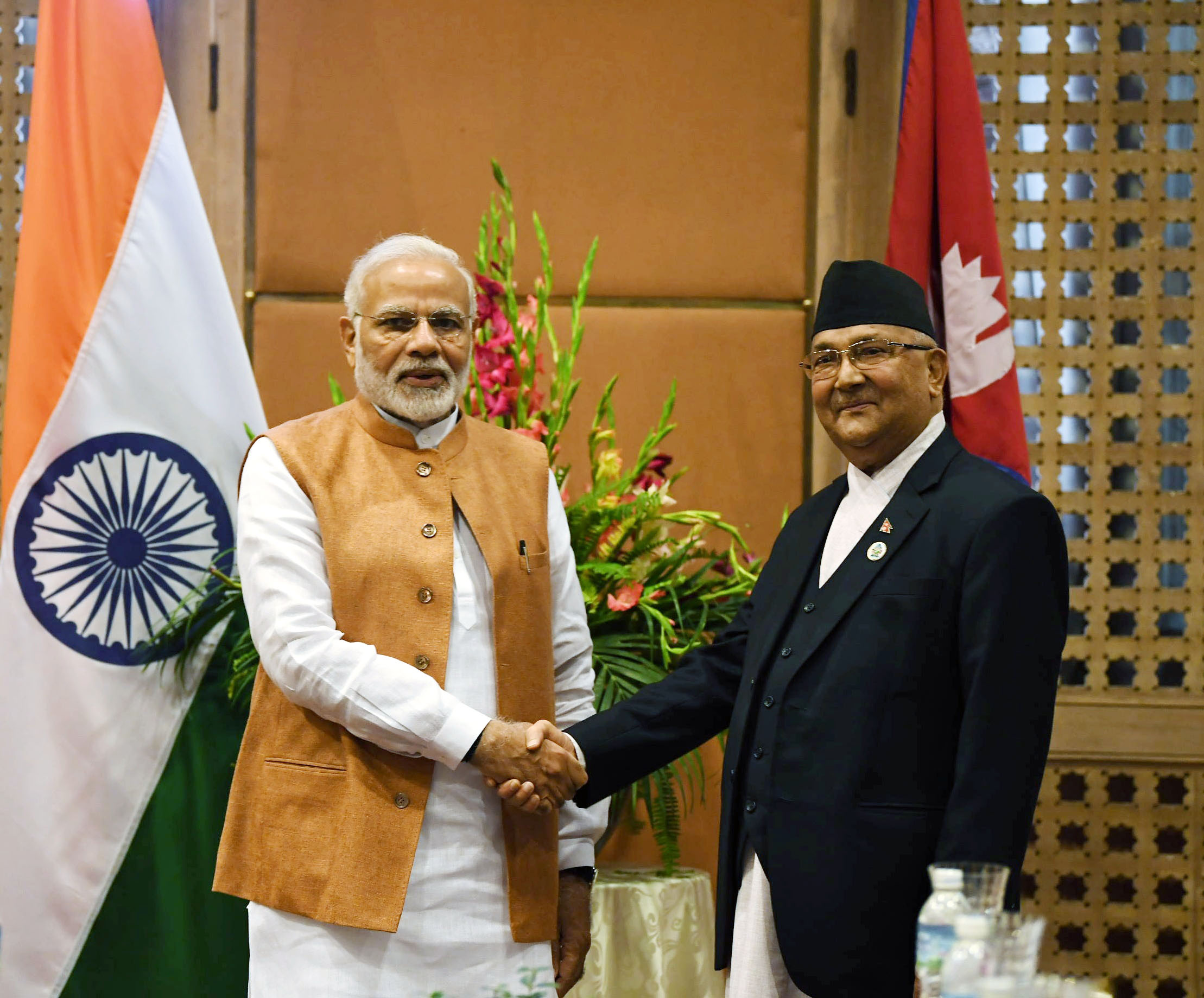
PM Narendra Modi, with Former Prime Minister of Nepal, KP Sharma Oli, in BIMSTEC Summit 2018 at Kathmandu.

Relations between India and Nepal are close yet fraught with difficulties stemming from border disputes, geography, economics, the problems inherent in big power-small power relations, and common ethnic and linguistic identities that overlap the two countries' borders. In 1950, New Delhi and Kathmandu initiated their intertwined relationship with the Treaty of Peace and Friendship and accompanying secret letters that defined security relations between the two countries, and an agreement governing both bilateral trade and trade transiting Indian soil. The 1950 treaty and letters stated that "neither government shall tolerate any threat to the security of the other by a foreign aggressor" and obligated both sides "to inform each other of any serious friction or misunderstanding with any neighboring state likely to cause any breach in the friendly relations subsisting between the two governments", and also granted the Indian and Nepali citizens right to get involved in any economic activity such as work and business-related activity in each other's territory. These accords cemented a "special relationship" between India and Nepal that granted Nepalese in India the same economic and educational opportunities as Indian citizens.

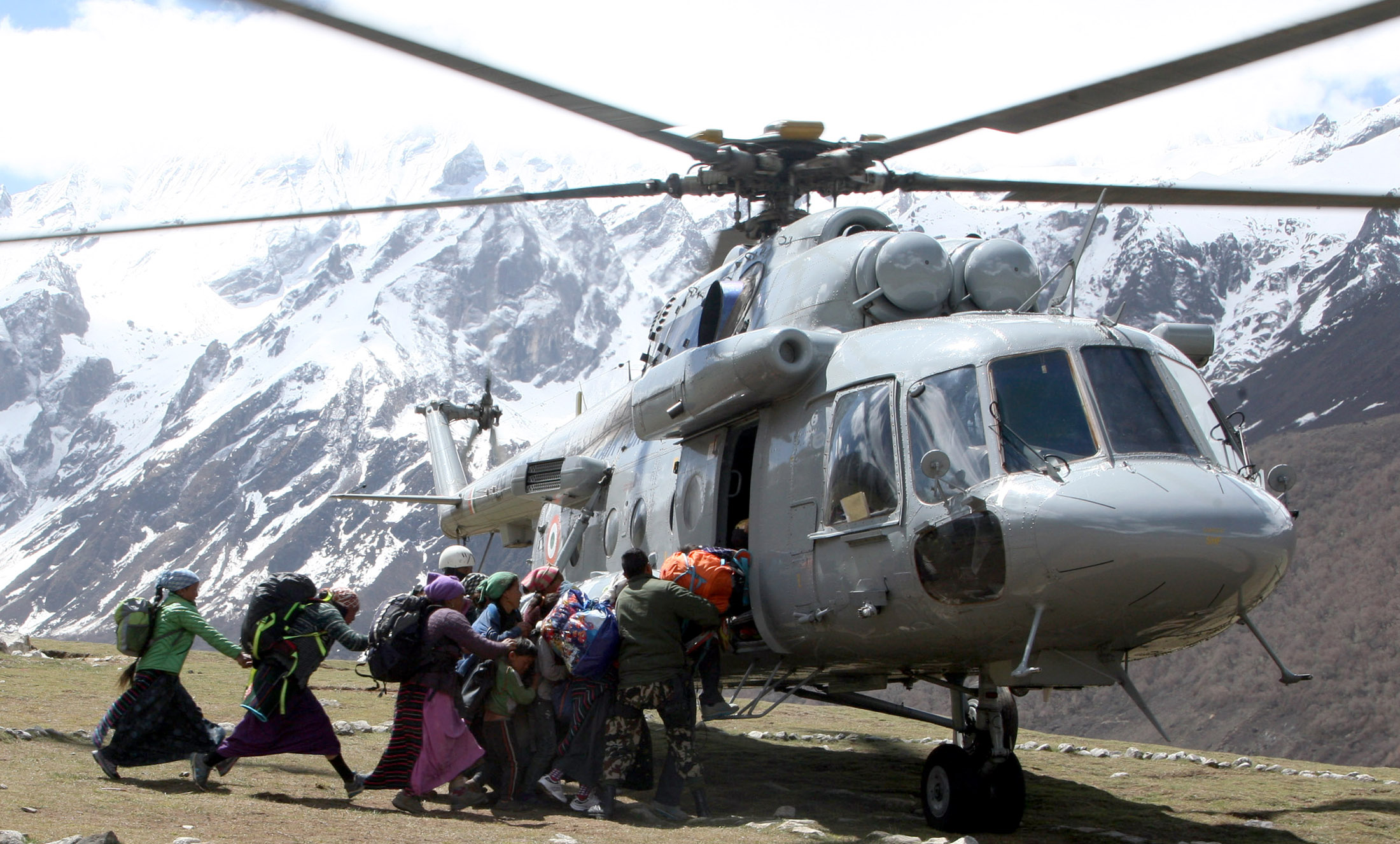
Local Nepalese and Army persons are being evacuated by the Indian Air Force (IAF) Mi-17 V5 helicopter at the directions of Nepalese authority as part of relief & rescue operations following the 2015 Kathmandu Earthquake.

Relations between India and Nepal reached their lowest in 1989 when India imposed a 13-month-long economic blockade on Nepal. Indian PM Narendra Modi visited Nepal in 2014, the first by an Indian PM in nearly 17 years.

In 2015, a blockade of the India-Nepal border affected relations. The blockade was led by ethnic communities angered by Nepal's recently promulgated new constitution. However, the Nepalese government accuses India of deliberately worsening the embargo, but India denies it.

India aided Nepal during the 2015 Kathmandu earthquake with the financial aid of $1 billion and launched Operation Maitri.

The relations were strained during mid-2020, when it was reported that a firing took place by the Nepalese police across the Indo-Nepalese border of Bihar on 12 July. Nepalese Prime Minister KP Sharma Oli commented about the pandemic of Coronavirus that the "Indian virus was deadlier" than the one which spread from Wuhan. As time progressed, certain claims were also made on the Indian territories, for example, Kalapani, Limpiyadhura and Lipulekh of Uttarakhand. Similarly, the claims were also made culturally, when it was said that Hindu God Ram was Nepalese, that he was born in Thori, west of Birgunj, and that Ayodhya in Uttar Pradesh was fake. Rules were made strict for Indians in Nepal along with banning some Indian media.

Indian media stated that the actions of the Oli government were souring the relations, "and these were being done on the direction of China and propelled by Chinese ambassador Hou Yanqi". Speculations were made that since China could not handle India directly, in the aftermath of the LAC skirmish, it was lurking and trapping its neighbouring countries and provoking them against India. In August, there were reports about the Chinese "illegal occupations" in Nepal's border states' areas.

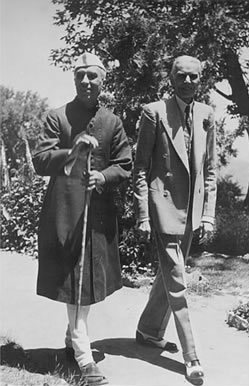
Jawahar Lal Nehru and Muhammed Ali Jinnah walking in the grounds of Government House, Simla, British India.

Pakistan

Both countries established diplomatic relations on 15 August 1947.

Despite historical, cultural and ethnic links between them, relations between India and Pakistan have been "plagued" by years of mistrust and suspicion ever since the partition of India in 1947. The principal source of contention between India and its western neighbour has been the Kashmir conflict. After an invasion by Pashtun tribesmen and Pakistani paramilitary forces, the Hindu Maharaja of the Dogra Kingdom of Jammu and Kashmir, Hari Singh, and its Muslim Prime Minister, Sheikh Abdullah, signed an Instrument of Accession with New Delhi. The First Kashmir War started after the Indian Army entered Srinagar, the capital of the state, to secure the area from the invading forces. The war ended in December 1948 with the Line of Control dividing the erstwhile princely state into territories administered by Pakistan (northern and western areas) and India (southern, central and northeastern areas). Pakistan contested the legality of the Instrument of Accession since the Dogra Kingdom had signed a standstill agreement with it. The Indo-Pakistani War of 1965 started following the failure of Pakistan's Operation Gibraltar, which was designed to infiltrate forces into Jammu and Kashmir to precipitate an insurgency against rule by India. The five-week war caused thousands of casualties on both sides. It ended in a United Nations (UN) mandated ceasefire and the subsequent issuance of the Tashkent Declaration. India and Pakistan went to war again in 1971, this time the conflict being over East Pakistan. The large-scale atrocities committed there by the Pakistan army led to millions of Bengali refugees pouring over into India. India, along with the Mukti Bahini, defeated Pakistan, and the Pakistani forces surrendered on the eastern front. The war resulted in the creation of Bangladesh. In 1998, India carried out the Pokhran-II nuclear tests, which were followed by Pakistan's Chagai-I tests. Following the Lahore Declaration in February 1999, relations briefly improved. A few months later, however, Pakistani paramilitary forces and the Pakistan Army infiltrated in large numbers into the Kargil district of Indian Kashmir. This initiated the Kargil War after India moved in thousands of troops to successfully flush out the infiltrators. Although the conflict did not result in a full-scale war between India and Pakistan, relations between the two reached an all-time low, which worsened even further following the involvement of Pakistan-based terrorists in the hijacking of the Indian Airlines Flight 814 in December 1999. Attempts to normalise relations, such as the Agra summit held in July 2001, failed. An attack on the Indian Parliament in December 2001, which was blamed on Pakistan, which had condemned the attack caused a military standoff between the two countries which lasted for nearly a year raising fears of nuclear warfare. However, a peace process, initiated in 2003, led to improved relations in the following years.

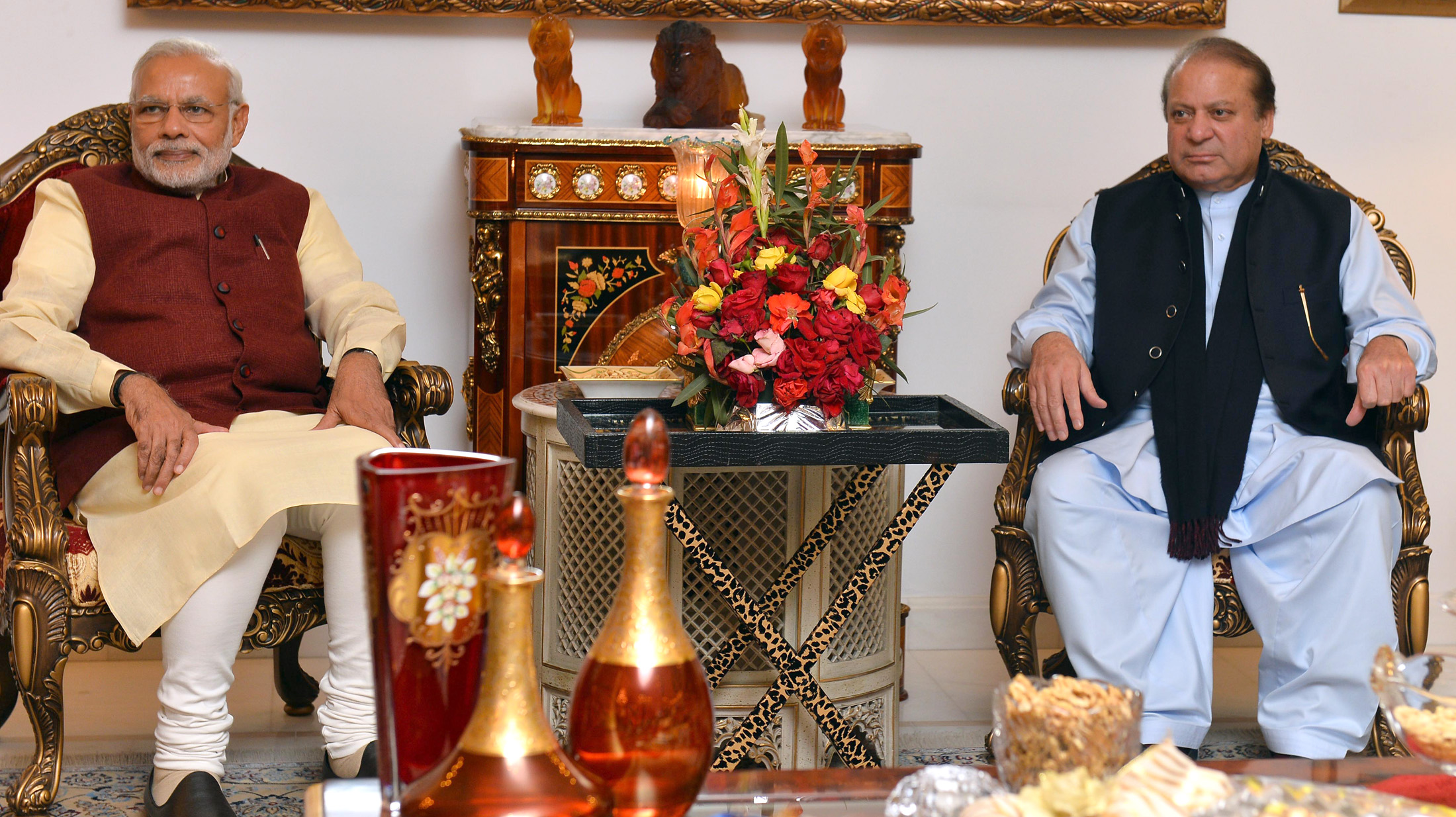
PM Narendra Modi meeting Former Prime Minister of Pakistan, Nawaz Sharif, at Raiwind, Pakistan (2015, last formal dialogue)

Since the initiation of the peace process, several confidence-building measures (CBMs) between India and Pakistan have taken shape. The Samjhauta Express and Delhi–Lahore Bus service are two of these successful measures which have played a crucial role in expanding people-to-people contact between the two countries. The initiation of the Srinagar–Muzaffarabad Bus service in 2005 and the opening of a historic trade route across the Line of Control in 2008 further reflects increasing eagerness between the two sides to improve relations. Although bilateral trade between India and Pakistan was a modest US$1.7 billion in March 2007, it is expected to cross US$10 billion by 2010. After the 2005 Kashmir earthquake, India sent aid to affected areas in Pakistani Kashmir and Punjab as well as Indian Kashmir.

The 2008 Mumbai attacks seriously undermined the relations between the two countries. India alleged Pakistan was harbouring militants on their soil, while Pakistan vehemently denied such claims.

A new chapter started in India-Pakistan relations when a new NDA government took charge in Delhi after victory in the 2014 election and invited SAARC members' leaders to an oath-taking ceremony. Subsequently, the visit of the Indian prime minister on 25 December informally wished Pakistani Prime Minister Nawaz Sharif on his Birthday and participated in his daughter's wedding. It was hoped that the relationship between the neighbour will improve but an attack on an Indian army camp by Pakistani infiltrators on 18 September 2016 and a subsequent surgical strike by India aggravated the already strained relationship between the nations.

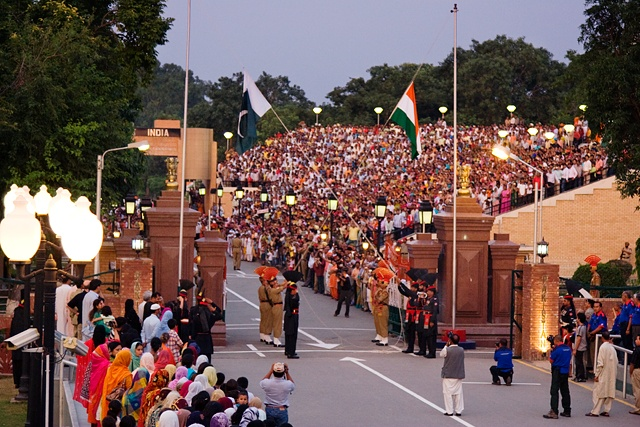
The evening flag lowering ceremony at the India-Pakistan International Border near Wagah. Taken from the Pakistani side.

A SAARC summit scheduled in Islamabad was called off because of a boycott by India and other SAARC members subsequently.

The relationship took a further nosedive after another attack on CRPF in February 2019 by a terrorist associated with the Pakistan-based terror organisation, Jaish-e-Mohammed, when the terrorist rammed his vehicle packed with explosives against a bus carrying CRPF soldiers in Pulwama, Kashmir, killing 40. India blamed Pakistan which was denied by the Pakistani establishment. India retaliated with an airstrike on Balakot, a region claimed and controlled by Pakistan.

A new chapter in peace was ignited when it was suddenly declared that a back-door peace settlement over ceasing the cross-border firing across the LOC was signed between the armies of both sides, and a steady growth in the countries coming together was observed.

Sri Lanka

Bilateral relations between Sri Lanka and India have enjoyed a good relationship historically. The two countries share near-identical racial and cultural ties. According to traditional Sri Lankan chronicles (Dipavamsa), Buddhism was introduced into Sri Lanka in the 4th century BCE by Venerable Mahinda, the son of Indian Emperor Ashoka, during the reign of Sri Lanka's King Devanampiya Tissa. During this time, a sapling of the Bodhi Tree was brought to Sri Lanka, and the first monasteries and Buddhist monuments were established.

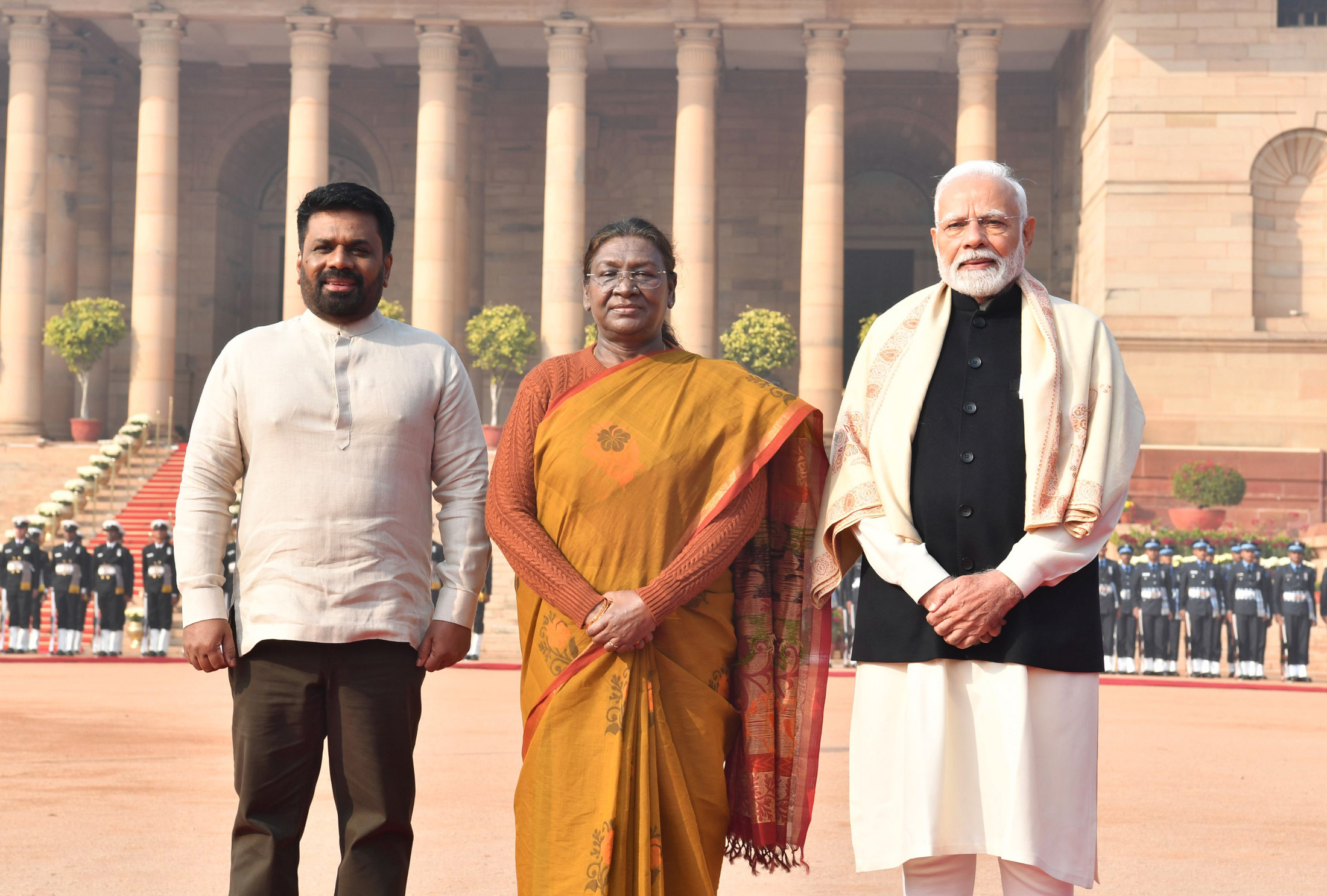
Sri Lankan President Anura Kumara Dissanayake with President of India Droupadi Murmu and Prime Minister of India Narendra Modi

Nevertheless, relations post-independence were affected by the Sri Lankan Civil War and by the failure of Indian intervention during the civil war as well as India's support for Tamil Tiger militants. India is Sri Lanka's only neighbour, separated by the Palk Strait; both nations occupy a strategic position in South Asia and have sought to build a common security umbrella in the Indian Ocean.

India-Sri Lanka relations have undergone a qualitative and quantitative transformation in the recent past. Political relations are close, trade and investments have increased dramatically, infrastructural linkages are constantly being augmented, defence collaboration has increased, and there is a general, broad-based improvement across all sectors of bilateral cooperation. India was the first country to respond to Sri Lanka's request for assistance after the tsunami in December 2004. In July 2006, India evacuated 430 Sri Lankan nationals from Lebanon, first to Cyprus by Indian Navy ships and then to Delhi and Colombo by special Air India flights.

PM of Sri Lanka, Ms. Harini Amarasuriya meets PM of India, Narendra Modi on October 17, 2025.

There exists a broad consensus within the Sri Lankan polity on the primacy of India in Sri Lanka's external relations matrix. Both the major political parties in Sri Lanka, the Sri Lanka Freedom Party and the United Nationalist Party have contributed to the rapid development of bilateral relations in the last ten years. Sri Lanka has supported India's candidature to the permanent membership of the UN Security Council.

India and its neighbour countries.

SAARC

Certain aspects of India's relations within the subcontinent are conducted through the South Asian Association for Regional Cooperation (SAARC). Its members other than India are Afghanistan, Bangladesh, Bhutan, Maldives, Nepal, Pakistan and Sri Lanka. Established in 1985, SAARC encourages cooperation in agriculture, rural development, science and technology, culture, health, population control, narcotics control and anti-terrorism.

SAARC has intentionally stressed these "core issues" and avoided more divisive political issues, although the political dialogue is often conducted on the margins of SAARC meetings. In 1993, India and its SAARC partners signed an agreement to gradually lower tariffs within the region. Forward movement in SAARC has come to a standstill because of the tension between India and Pakistan, and the SAARC Summit originally scheduled for, but not held in, November 1999 has not been rescheduled. The Fourteenth SAARC Summit was held during 3–4 April 2007 in New Delhi. The 19th SAARC summit that was scheduled to be held in Islamabad was cancelled due to terrorist acts, particularly the Uri attack.

Members of BIMSTEC.

BIMSTEC

Bay of Bengal Initiative for Multi-Sectoral Technical and Economic Cooperation is now an "organization of member states" that are littorals of the Bay of Bengal or adjacent to it. The BIMSTEC member states – Bangladesh, Bhutan, India, Myanmar, Nepal, Sri Lanka, and Thailand – are among the major South and Southeast Asia countries dependent on the Bay of Bengal. India and some other countries, frustrated by the obstacles in SAARC's efforts to promote regional cooperation, have been working to make BIMSTEC the premier vehicle in this regard.

=== Southeast ===
Brunei

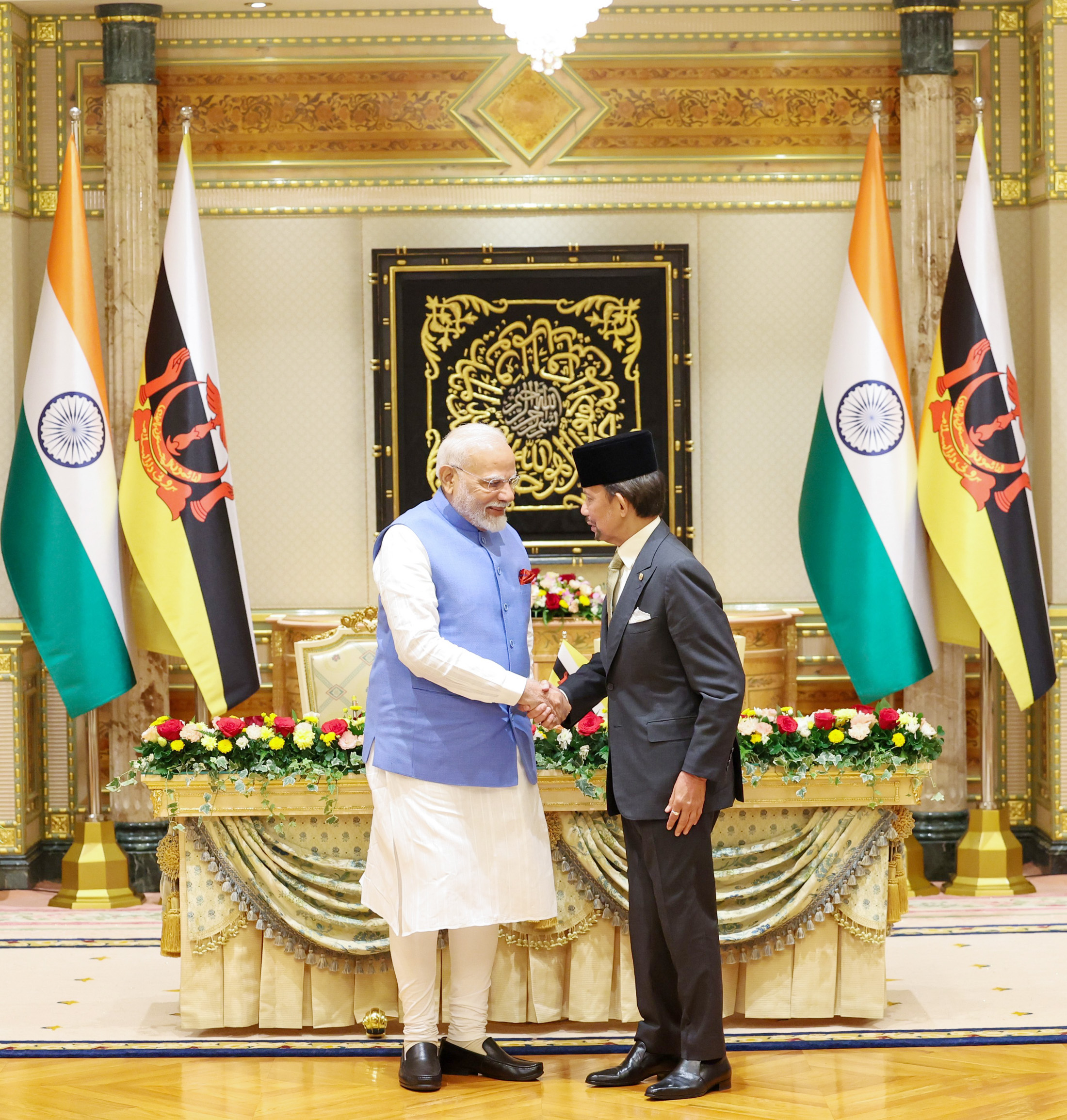
The Prime Minister, Shri Narendra Modi meets His Majesty Sultan Haji Hassanal Bolkiah in Brunei on September 04, 2024.

Brunei has a high commission in New Delhi, and India has a high commission in Bandar Seri Begawan. Both countries are full members of the Commonwealth of Nations.

Cambodia

Both nations have been in friendly relations.

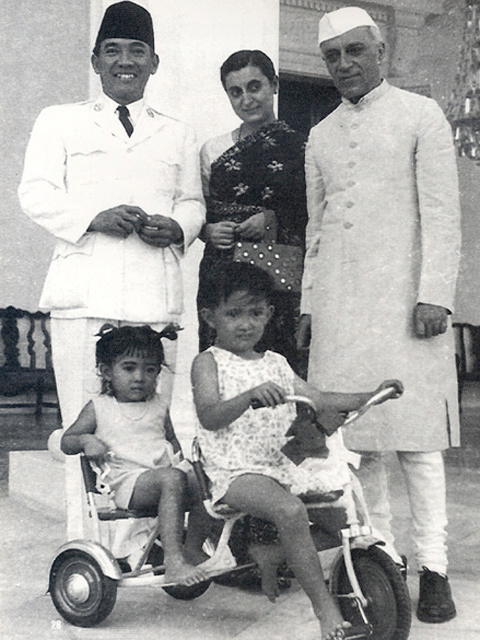
Jawaharlal Nehru and his daughter Indira Gandhi with Sukarno, Megawati Sukarnoputri and Guruh Sukarnoputra, Indonesia, 1950.

Indonesia

The ties between Indonesia and India date back to the times of the Ramayana, "Yawadvipa" (Java) is mentioned in India's earliest epic, the Ramayana. Sugriva, the chief of Rama's army dispatched his men to Yawadvipa, the island of Java, in search of Sita. Indonesians had absorbed many aspects of Indian culture since almost two millennia ago. The most obvious trace is the large adoption of Sanskrit into the Indonesian language. Several Indonesian toponymy has Indian parallel or origin, such as Madura with Mathura, Serayu and Sarayu rivers, Kalingga from Kalinga Kingdom, and Ngayogyakarta from Ayodhya. Indianised Hindu–Buddhist kingdoms, such as Kalingga, Srivijaya, Mataram, Sunda, Kadiri, Singhasari and Majapahit were the predominant governments in Indonesia, and lasted from 200 to the 1500s, with the last remaining being in Bali. An example of profound Hindu-Buddhist influences in Indonesian history is the 9th-century Prambanan and Borobudur temples.

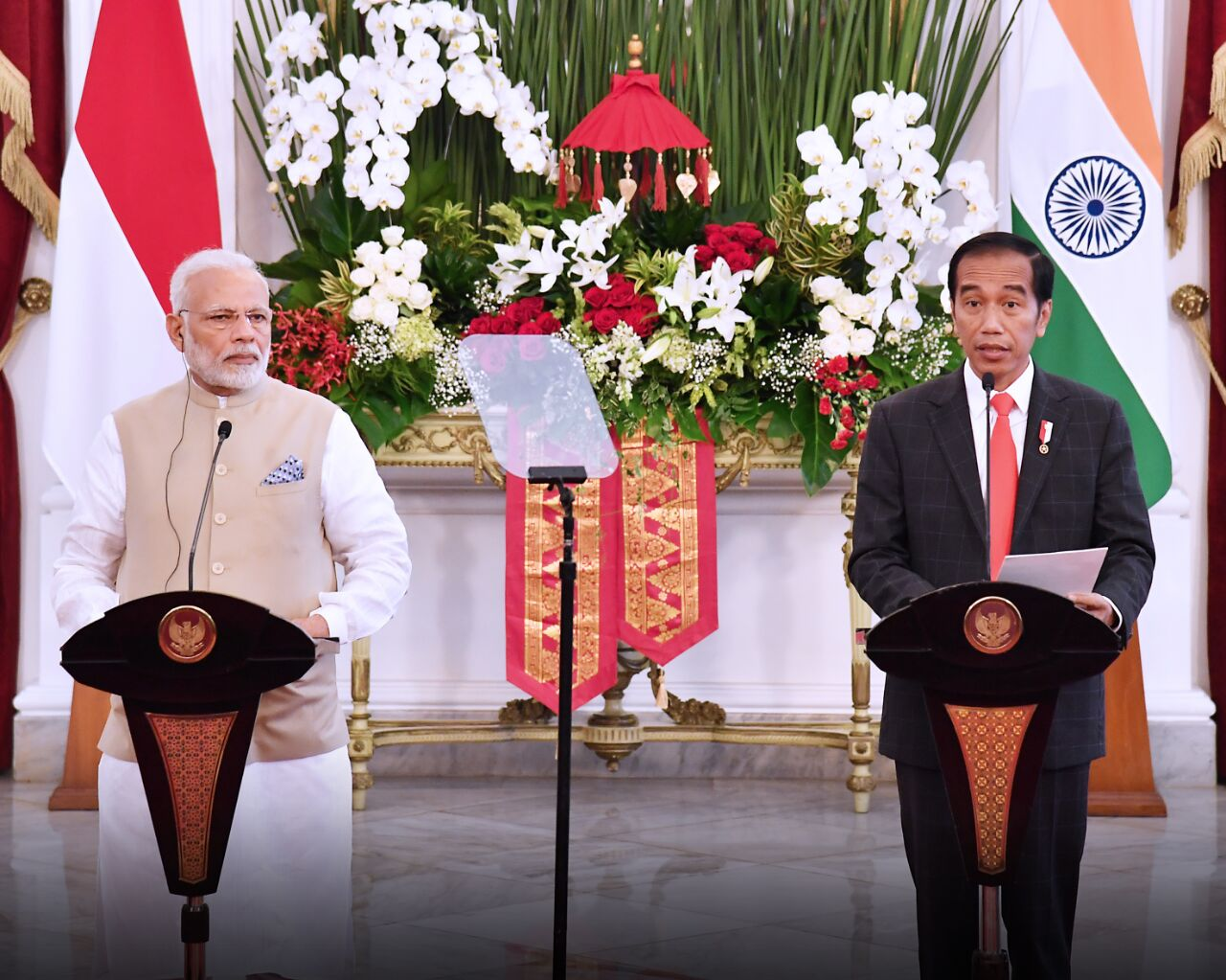
PM Narendra Modi meets Indonesian President Joko Widodo, in Jakarta (2018)

In 1950, the first President of Indonesia – Sukarno called upon the peoples of Indonesia and India to "intensify the cordial relations" that had existed between the two countries "for more than 1000 years" before they had been "disrupted" by colonial powers. In the spring of 1966, the foreign ministers of both countries began speaking again of an era of friendly relations. India had supported Indonesian independence, and Nehru had raised the Indonesian question in the United Nations Security Council.

PM Modi with Indonesian President Prabowo Subianto visits Prambanan Temple, in Indonesia on July 08, 2026.

India has an embassy in Jakarta and Indonesia operates an embassy in Delhi. India regards Indonesia as a key member of ASEAN. Today, both countries maintain cooperative and friendly relations. India and Indonesia are two of the few (and also one of the largest) democracies in the Asian region that can be projected as a real democracy. Both nations had agreed to establish a strategic partnership. As fellow Asian democracies that share common values, it is natural for both countries to nurture and foster strategic alliances. Indonesia and India are member states of the G-20, the E7, the Non-Aligned Movement, and the United Nations.

Laos

Narendra Modi meeting with President of Laos Thongloun Sisoulith hosting the ASEAN Summit and the East Asia Summit in Vientiane on 11 October 2024.

In recent years, India has endeavoured to build relations with this small Southeast Asian nation. They have strong military relations, and India shall be building an Airforce Academy in Laos.

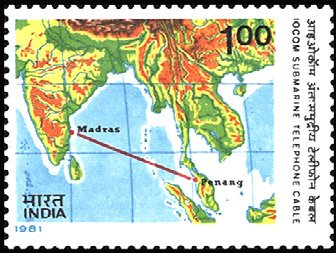
Stamp of India - IOCOM Submarine Telephone Cable

Malaysia

India has a high commission in Kuala Lumpur, and Malaysia has a high commission in New Delhi. Both countries are full members of the Commonwealth of Nations and the Asian Union. India and Malaysia are also connected by various cultural and historical ties that date back to antiquity. The two countries are on friendly terms with each other, and Malaysia harbours a small population of Indian immigrants. Mahathir bin Mohamad, the fourth and longest-serving prime minister of Malaysia, is of Indian origin. His father, Mohamad Iskandar, is a Malayalee Muslim who migrated from Kerala, and his mother, Wan Tampawan, is a Malay.

Relations escalated when the Malaysian PM Mahathir Mohamad questioned the action of revocating the special status of Jammu and Kashmir and on CAA-NRC protests. The relations continue to be diminished, also during the palm oil export from Malaysia to India.

Even with the new government in power, currently, there seems no recovery, as former Prime Minister Mahathir Mohamad still favoured Pakistan.

Myanmar

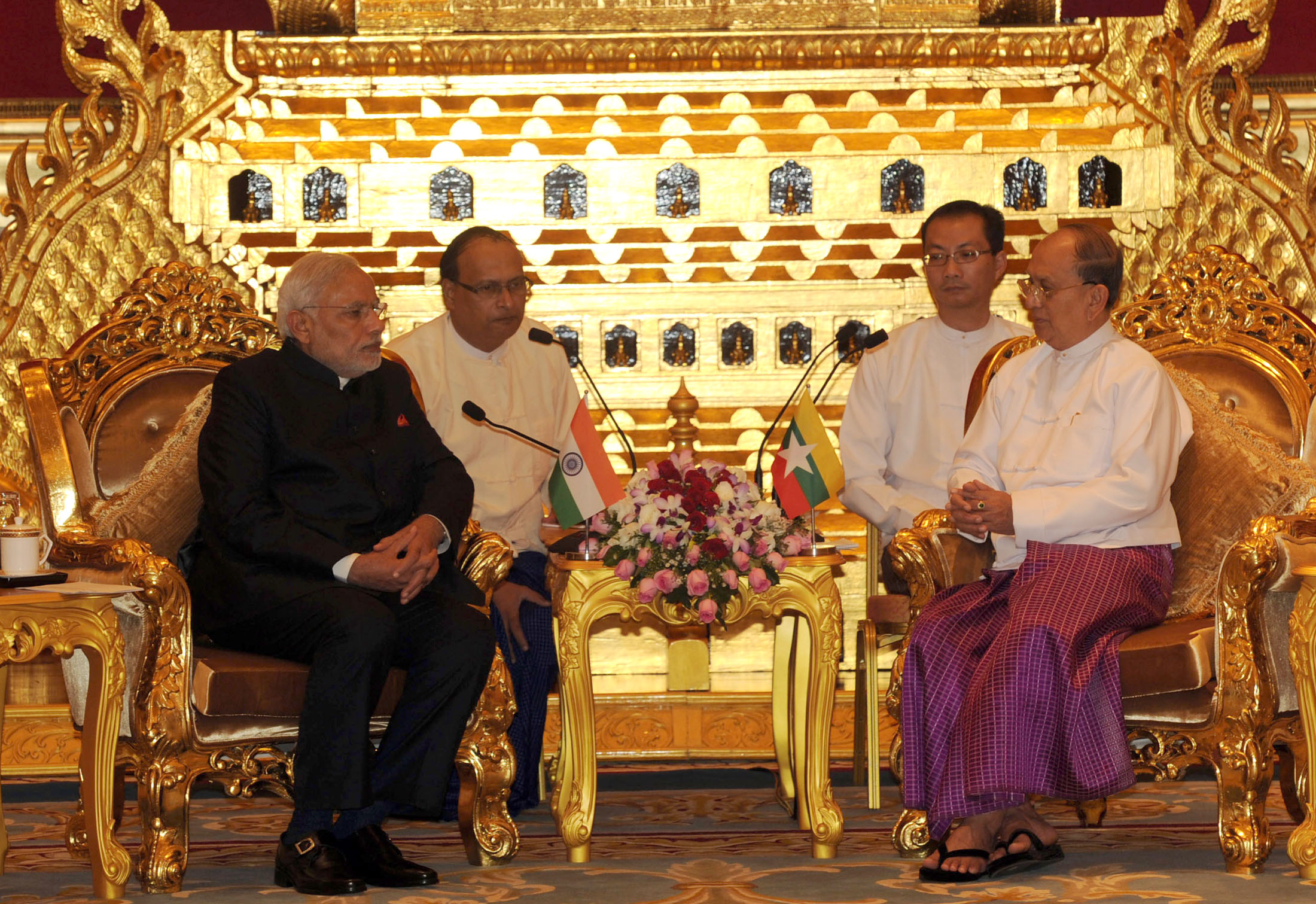
The Prime Minister, Shri Narendra Modi calling on the President of Myanmar, Mr. U. Thein Sein, at Nay Pyi Taw, Myanmar on 11 November 2014

India established diplomatic relations after Burma's independence from Great Britain in 1948. For many years, Indo-Burmese relations were strong due to cultural links, flourishing commerce, common interests in regional affairs, and the presence of a significant Indian community in Burma. India provided considerable support when Myanmar struggled with regional insurgencies. However, the overthrow of the democratic government by the Military of Burma led to strains in ties. Along with much of the world, India condemned the suppression of democracy, and Myanmar ordered the expulsion of the Burmese Indian community, increasing its isolation from the world. Only China maintained close links with Myanmar while India supported the pro-democracy movement.

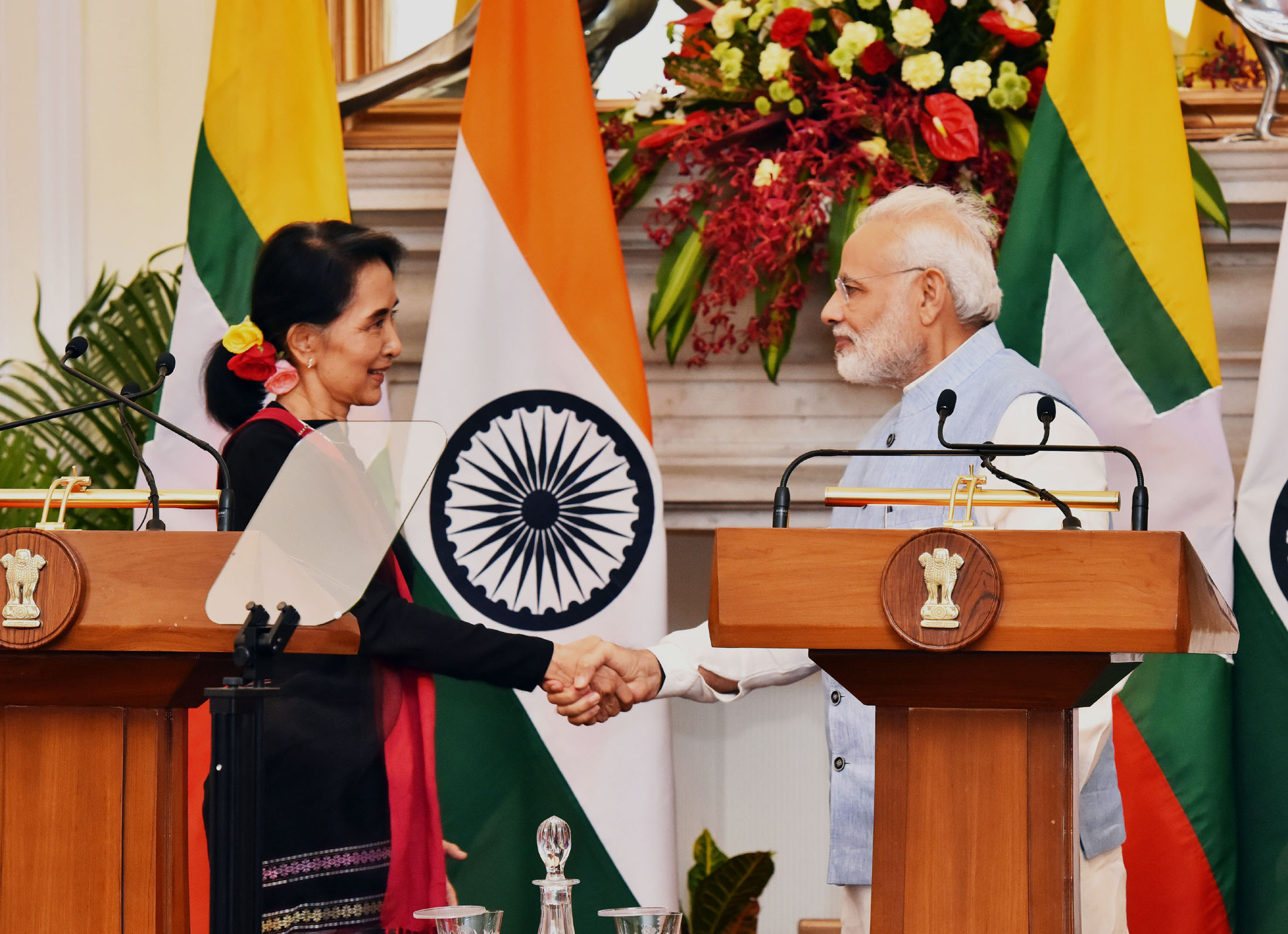
The Prime Minister, Shri Narendra Modi and the State Counsellor of Myanmar, Ms. Aung San Suu Kyi at the Joint Press Statement, at Hyderabad House, in New Delhi on 19 October 2016.

However, due to geopolitical concerns, India revived its relations and recognised the military junta ruling Myanmar in 1993, overcoming strains over drug trafficking, the suppression of democracy and the rule of the military junta in Myanmar. Myanmar is situated to the south of the states of Mizoram, Manipur, Nagaland and Arunachal Pradesh in Northeast India. The proximity of the People's Republic of China gives strategic importance to Indo-Burmese relations. The Indo-Burmese border stretches over 1,600 kilometres and some insurgents in North-east India seek refuge in Myanmar. Consequently, India has been keen on increasing military cooperation with Myanmar in its counter-insurgency activities. In 2001, the Indian Army completed the construction of a major road along its border with Myanmar. India has also been building major roads, highways, ports and pipelines within Myanmar in an attempt to increase its strategic influence in the region and also to counter China's growing strides in the Indochina peninsula. Indian companies have also sought active participation in oil and natural gas exploration in Myanmar. In February 2007, India announced a plan to develop the Sittwe port, which would enable ocean access from Indian Northeastern states like Mizoram, via the Kaladan River.

Pm Narendra Modi with Mr. Min Aung Hlaing, President of the Republic of the Union of Myanmar in Tianjin China on August 31, 2025.

India is a major customer of Burmese oil and gas. In 2007, Indian exports to Myanmar totalled US$185 million, while its imports from Myanmar were valued at around US$810 million, consisting mostly of oil and gas. India has granted US$100 million credit to fund highway infrastructure projects in Myanmar, while US$57 million has been offered to upgrade Burmese railways. A further US$27 million in grants has been pledged for road and rail projects. India is one of the few countries that has provided military assistance to the Burmese junta. However, there has been increasing pressure on India to cut some of its military supplies to Burma. Relations between the two remain close which was evident in the aftermath of Cyclone Nargis, when India was one of the few countries whose relief and rescue aid proposals were accepted by Myanmar's junta.

India maintains embassies in Rangoon and consulate generals in Mandalay.

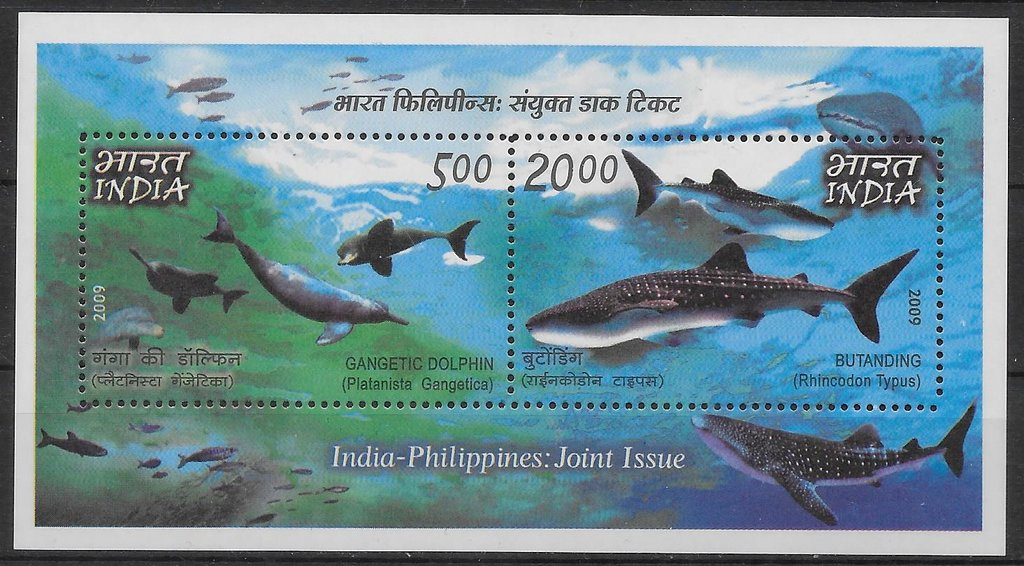
Stamp of Ganges River Dolphin (Platanista gangetica) and Whale Shark (Rhincodon typus), 2009, India-Philippines joint issue.

Philippines

Through the Srivijaya and Majapahit empires, Hindu influence has been visible in Philippine history from the 10th to 14th centuries. During the 18th century, there was robust trade between Manila and the Coromandel Coast and Bengal, involving Philippine exports of tobacco, silk, cotton, indigo, sugar cane, and coffee.

PM Modi meeting with the President of Republic of the Philippines, Mr. Ferdinand Romualdez Marcos Jrduring 23rd ASEAN-India Summit and 21st East Asia Summits at Manila, in Philippines on November 17, 2026.

Formal diplomatic relations between the Philippines and India were established on 16 November 1949. The first Philippine envoy to India was the late Foreign Secretary Narciso Ramos. Seven years after India's independence in 1947, the Philippines and India signed a Treaty of Friendship on 11 July 1952 in Manila to strengthen the friendly relations existing between the two countries. Soon after, the Philippine Legation in New Delhi was established and then elevated to an embassy. However, due to foreign policy differences as a result of the bipolar alliance structure of the Cold War, the development of bilateral relations was stunted. It was only in 1976 that relations started to normalise when Aditya Birla, one of India's successful industrialists, met with then-President Ferdinand E. Marcos to explore possibilities of setting up joint ventures in the Philippines.

Prime Minister of Bharat, Shri Narendra Modi with the President of Indonesia, Mr. Prabowo Subianto and the President of Philippines, Mr. Bongbong Marcos on the sidelines of the 18th BRICS Summit in New Delhi on September 13, 2026.

Today, like India, the Philippines is the leading voice-operated business process outsourcing (BPO) source in terms of revenue (US$5.7 billion) and number of people (500,000) employed in the sector. In partnership with the Philippines, India has 20 IT/BPO companies in the Philippines. Philippines-India bilateral trade stood at US$986.60 million in 2009. In 2004 it was US$600 million. Both countries aim to reach US$1 billion by 2010. 60,000 Indians are living in the Philippines. The Philippines and India signed in October 2007 the Framework for Bilateral Cooperation, which created the PH-India JCBC. It has working groups in trade, agriculture, tourism, health, and renewable energy, a regular policy consultation mechanism, and a security dialogue.

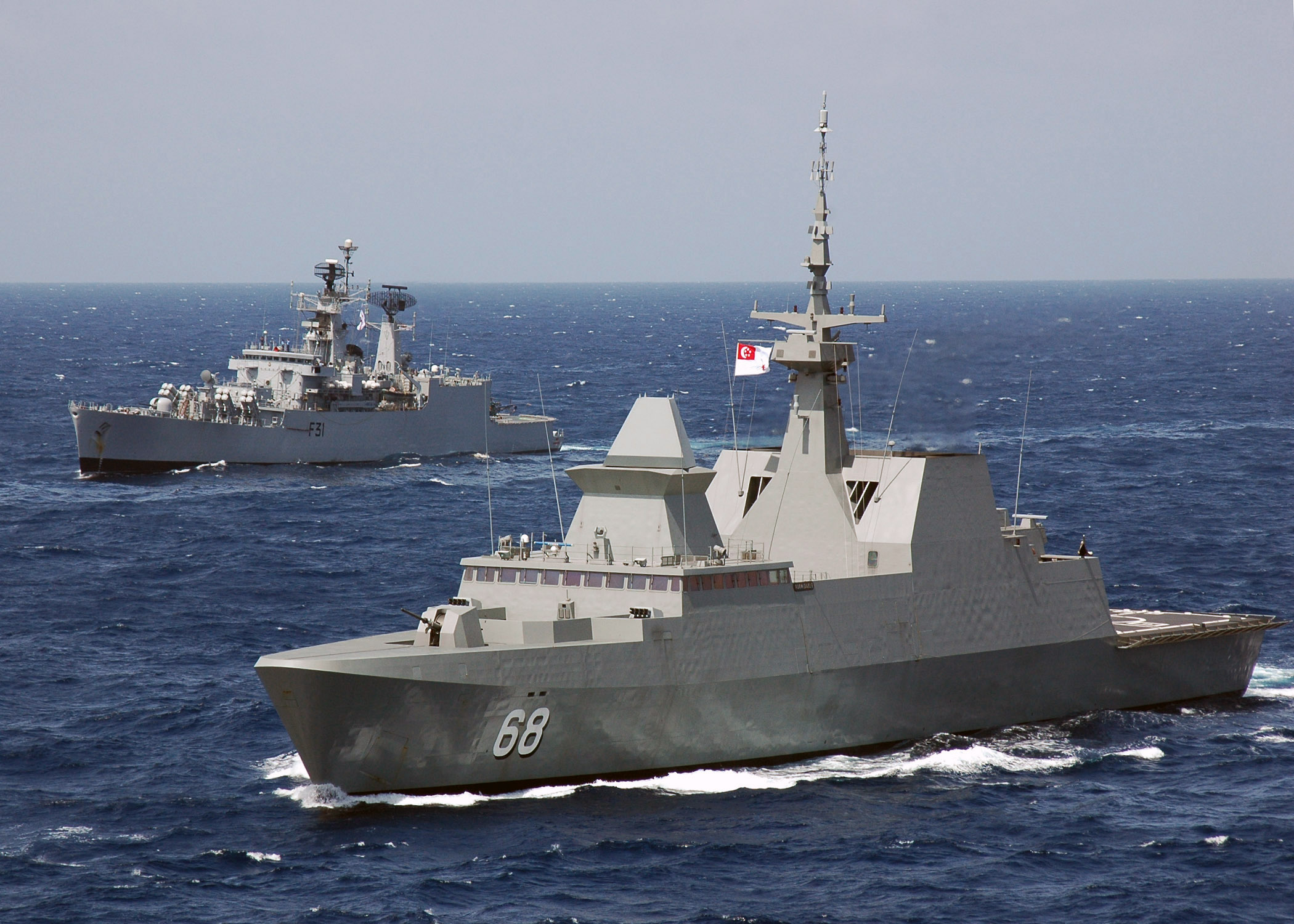
Singapore Navy frigate RSS Formidable (68) steams alongside the Indian Navy frigate INS Brahmaputra (F-31) in the Bay of Bengal. Singapore is one of India's strongest allies in South East Asia.

Singapore

India and Singapore share long-standing cultural, commercial and strategic relations, with Singapore being a part of the "Greater India" cultural and commercial region. More than 300,000 people of Indian Tamil "தமிழ்" origin live in Singapore. Following its independence in 1965, Singapore was concerned with China-backed communist threats as well as domination from Malaysia and Indonesia and sought a close strategic relationship with India, which it saw as a counterbalance to Chinese influence and a partner in achieving regional security. Singapore had always been an important strategic trading post, giving India trade access to Maritime Southeast Asia and the Far East. Although the rival positions of both nations over the Vietnam War and the Cold War caused consternation between India and Singapore, their relationship expanded significantly in the 1990s; Singapore was one of the first to respond to the Indian Look East policy of expanding its economic, cultural and strategic ties in Southeast Asia to strengthen its standing as a regional power. Singapore, and especially the Singaporean Foreign Minister, George Yeo, have taken an interest in re-establishing the ancient Indian university, Nalanda University.

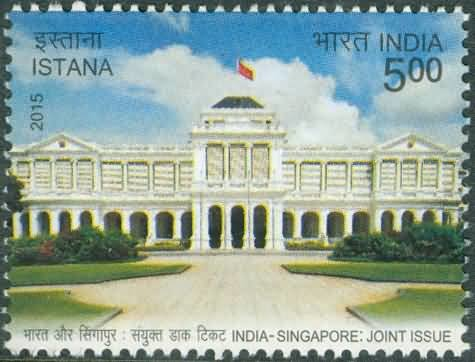
The Istana

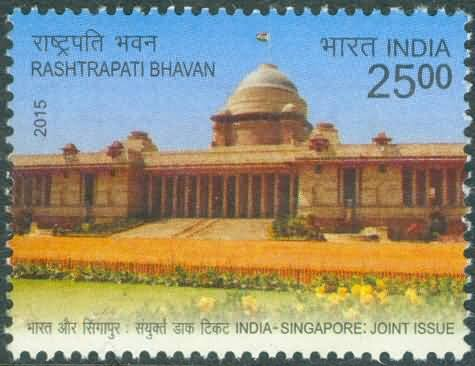
Rashtrapati Bhavan

India Singapore Joint Issue - 2015 - Commemorating relationship.

Singapore is the 8th largest source of investment in India and the largest among ASEAN member nations. It is also India's 9th biggest trading partner as of 2005–06. Its cumulative investment in India totals US$3 billion as of 2006 and is expected to rise to US$5 billion by 2010 and US$10 billion by 2015.

The President of India, Smt. Droupadi Murmu accorded a ceremonial welcome to Mr Tharman Shanmugaratnam, President of the Republic of Singapore at Rashtrapati Bhavan, in New Delhi on January 16, 2025.

India's economic liberalisation and its "Look East" policy have led to a major expansion in bilateral trade, which grew from US$2.2 billion in 2001 to US$9–10 billion in 2006 – a 400% growth in five years – and to US$50 billion by 2010. Singapore accounts for 38% of India's trade with ASEAN member nations and 3.4% of its total foreign trade. India's main exports to Singapore in 2005 included petroleum, gemstones, jewellery, and machinery, and its imports from Singapore included electronic goods, organic chemicals, and metals. More than half of Singapore's exports to India are basically "re-exports" – items that had been imported from India.

Thailand

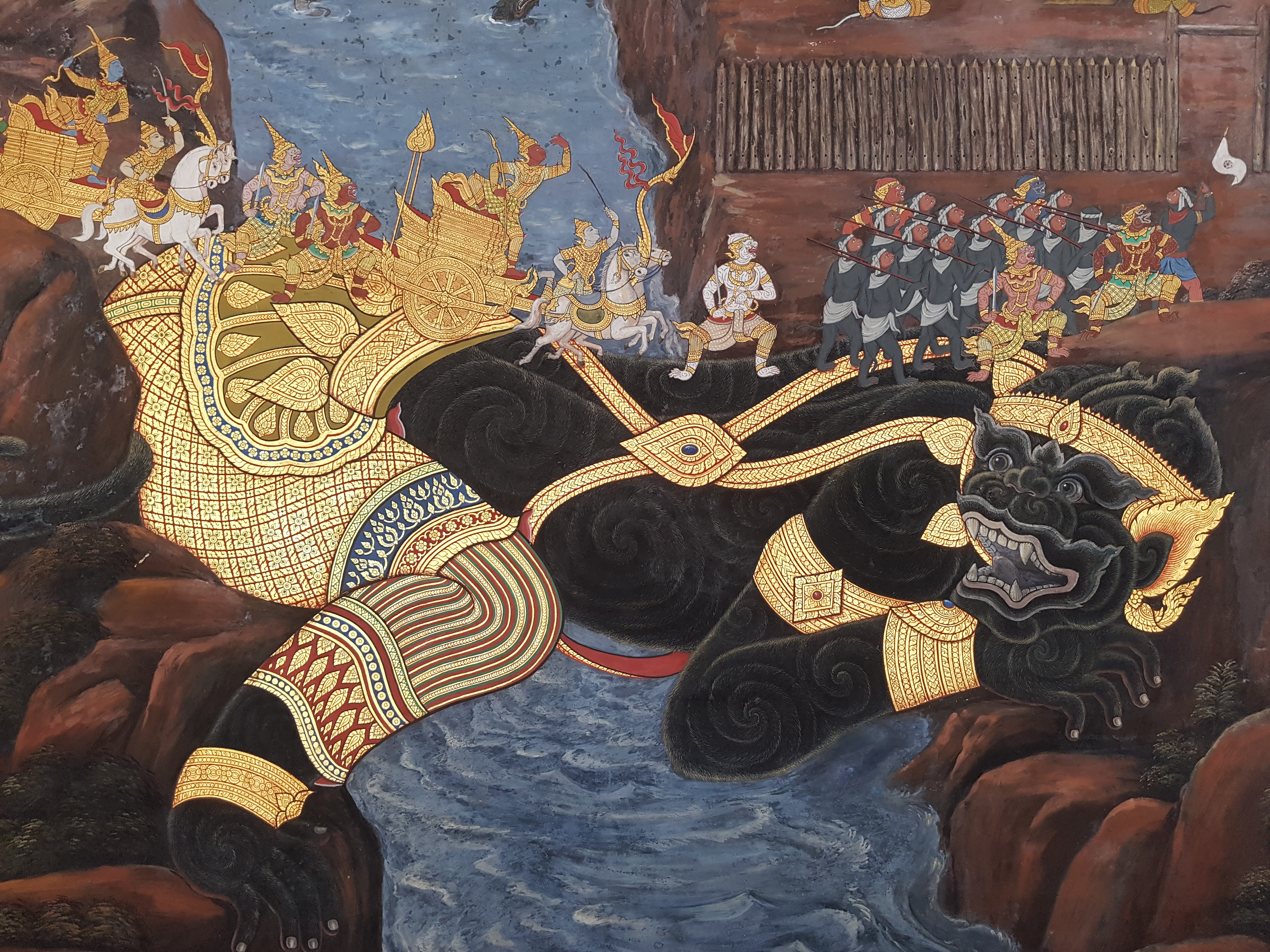
The mural of the Temple of the Emerald Buddha depicting Ninlaphat (Nila in Ramayana), a monkey soldier, serves as a bridge during an event in Ramakien ("Glory of Rama"), a Thai version of the Hindu epic Ramayana.

India's Indian Look East policy saw India grow relations with ASEAN countries, including Thailand, and Thailand's Look West policy also saw it grow its relations with India. Both countries are members of BIMSTEC. Indian prime ministers Rajiv Gandhi, P.V. Narasimha Rao, Atal Bihari Vajpayee, and Manmohan Singh have visited Thailand, which was reciprocated by contemporary Thai Prime Ministers Chatichai Choonhavan, Thaksin Sinawatra, and Surayud Chulanont.

PM Modi along with the Prime Minister of Thailand, Ms Paetongtarn Shinawatra at Bangkok, in Thailand on April 03, 2025.

In 2003, a Free Trade Agreement was signed between the two countries. India is the 13th largest investor in Thailand. The spheres of trade are in chemicals, pharmaceuticals, textiles, nylon, tyre cord, real estate, rayon fibres, paper-grade pulps, steel wires, and rods. However, IT services and manufacturing are the main spheres. Through Buddhism, India has culturally influenced Thailand. The Indian epics, Mahabharata and Ramayana, are popular and are widely taught in schools as part of the curriculum in Thailand. This example can also be seen in temples around Thailand, where the story of Ramayana and renowned Indian folk stories are depicted on the temple walls. Thailand has become a big tourist destination for Indians. Moreover, India and Thailand have been culturally linked for centuries, and India has had a deep influence on Thai culture. There are a substantial number of words in Thai that are borrowed from Sanskrit, India's classical language. Pali, which was the language of Magadha and is a medium of Theravada, is another important root of Thai vocabulary. Buddhism, the major religion of Thailand, itself originates from India. The Hindu story of Ramayana is also well known throughout Thailand in the name Ramakien.

Timor-Leste

Both nations have friendly and collateral relations.

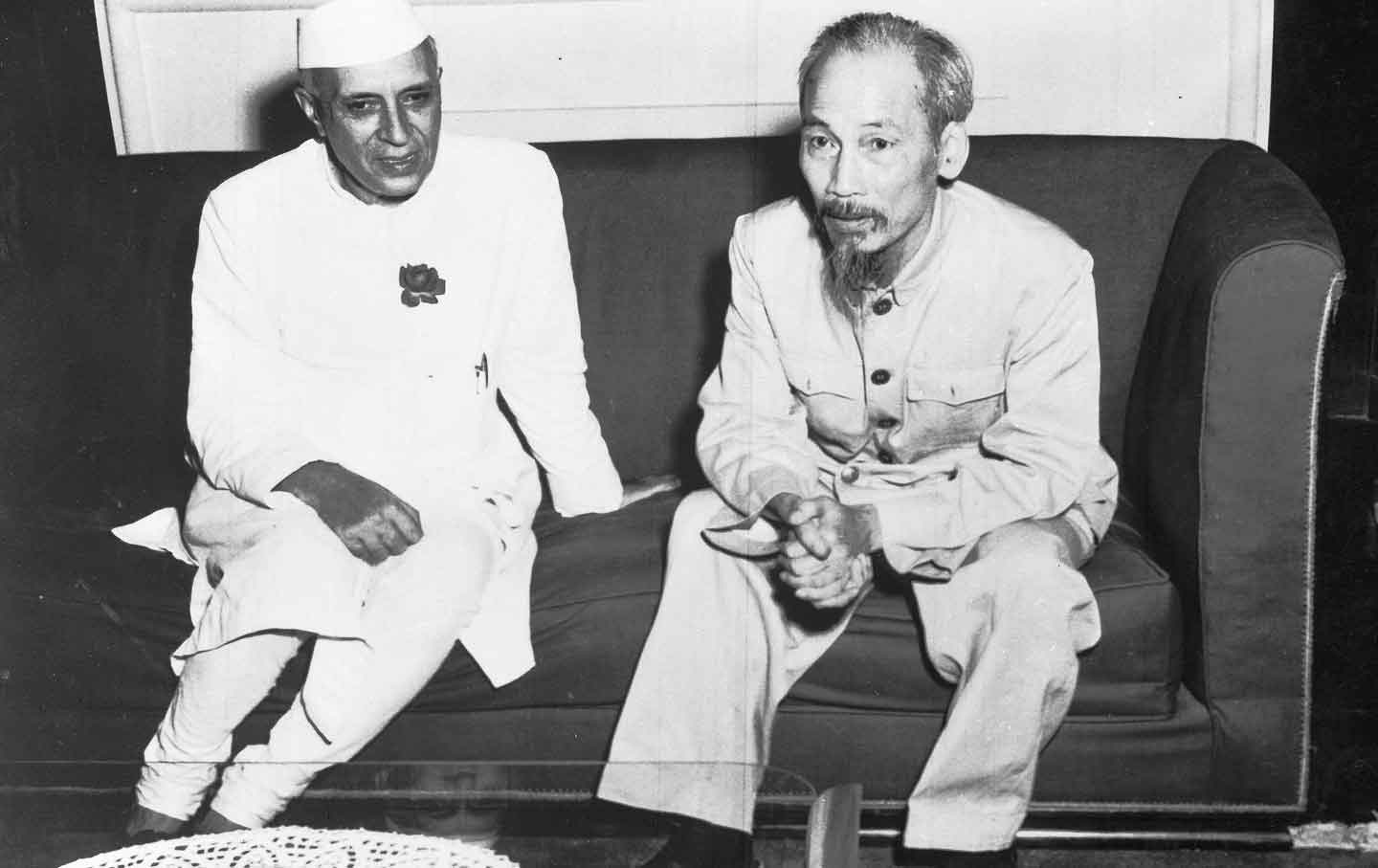
Indian Prime Minister Jawaharlal Nehru (left) and Vietnamese President Ho Chi Minh in Hanoi

Vietnam

India supported Vietnam's independence from France, opposed US involvement in the Vietnam War and supported the unification of Vietnam. India established official diplomatic relations in 1972 and maintained friendly relations, especially in the wake of Vietnam's hostile relations with the People's Republic of China, which had become India's strategic rival.

India granted the "Most favoured nation" status to Vietnam in 1975 and both nations signed a bilateral trade agreement in 1978 and the Bilateral Investment Promotion and Protection Agreement (BIPPA) on 8 March 1997. In 2007, a fresh joint declaration was issued during the state visit of the Prime Minister of Vietnam Nguyen Tan Dung. Bilateral trade has increased rapidly since the liberalisation of the economies of both Vietnam and India. India is the 13th-largest exporter to Vietnam, with exports having grown steadily from US$11.5 million in 1985–86 to US$395.68 million by 2003. Vietnam's exports to India rose to US$180 million, including agricultural products, handicrafts, textiles, electronics and other goods. Between 2001 and 2006, the volume of bilateral trade expanded at 20–30% per annum to reach $1 billion by 2006. Continuing the rapid pace of growth, bilateral trade is expected to rise to $2 billion by 2008, two years ahead of the official target. India and Vietnam have also expanded cooperation in information technology, education and collaboration of the respective national space programmes. Direct air links and lax visa regulations have been established to bolster tourism.

PM Narendra Modi President Droupadi Murmu attends the Ceremonial welcome event for Mr. To Lam, President of Vietnam in New Delhi on May 06, 2026.

India and Vietnam are members of the Mekong–Ganga Cooperation, created to enhance close ties between India and nations of Southeast Asia. Vietnam has supported India's bid to become a permanent member of the United Nations Security Council and join the Indo-Pacific Economic Cooperation (APEC). In the 2003 joint declaration, India and Vietnam envisaged creating an "Arc of Advantage and Prosperity" in Southeast Asia; to this end, Vietnam has backed a more important relationship and role between India and the Association of Southeast Asian Nations (ASEAN) and its negotiation of an Indo–ASEAN free trade agreement. India and Vietnam have also built strategic partnerships, including extensive cooperation in developing nuclear power, enhancing regional security and fighting terrorism, transnational crime and drug trafficking.

ASEAN

India's interaction with ASEAN during the Cold War was very limited. India declined to get associated with ASEAN in the 1960s when full membership was offered even before the grouping was formed.

PM Narendra Modi in a group family photograph along with ASEAN member at the 23rd ASEAN-India Summit at Manila, in Philippines on November 17, 2026.

It is only with the formulation of the Look East policy in the last decade (1992) that India started giving this region due importance in its foreign policy. India became a sectoral dialogue partner with ASEAN in 1992, a full dialogue partner in 1995, a member of the ASEAN Regional Forum (ARF) in 1996, and a summit-level partner (on par with China, Japan and Korea) in 2002. The first India–ASEAN Business Summit was held in New Delhi in October 2002. The then Prime Minister A. B. Vajpayee addressed this meeting, and since then this business summit has become an annual feature before the India–ASEAN Summits, as a forum for networking and exchange of business experiences between policymakers and business leaders from ASEAN and India.

Four India-ASEAN Summits, first in 2002 at Phnom Penh (Cambodia), second in 2003 at Bali, Indonesia, third in 2004 at Vientiane, Laos, and the fourth in 2005 at Kuala Lumpur, Malaysia, have taken place.

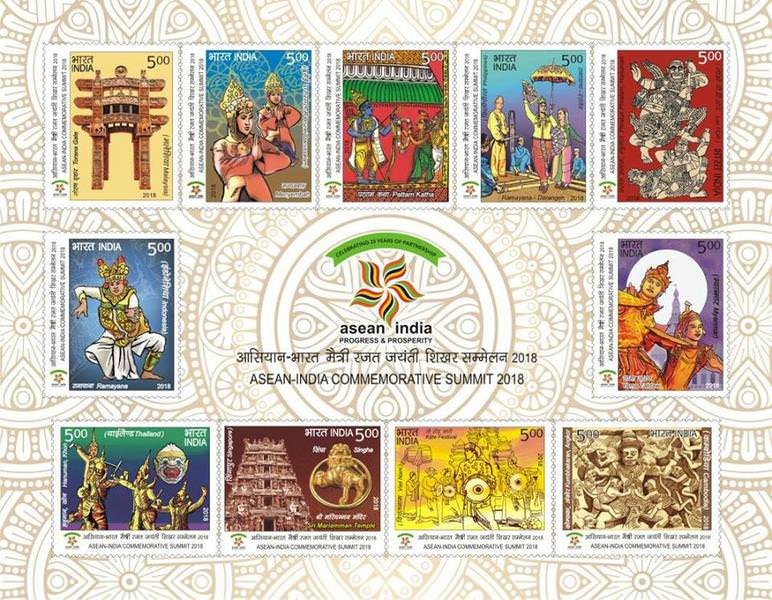
Stamp of India - ASEAN India Summit Delhi 2018 - Shared Heritage of Ramayana.

The following agreements have been entered into with ASEAN:

- Framework Agreement on Comprehensive Economic Cooperation (for establishing an FTA in a time frame of 10 years) was concluded in Bali in 2003.
- An ASEAN-India Joint Declaration for Cooperation to Combat International Terrorism has been adopted.
- India acceded to the Treaty of Amity and Cooperation (TAC) in 2003, on which ASEAN was formed initially (in 1967).
- The agreement on "India-ASEAN Partnership for Peace, Progress and Shared Prosperity" was signed at the 3rd ASEAN-India Summit in November 2004.
- Setting up of Entrepreneurship Development Centres in ASEAN member states – Cambodia, Burma, Laos, and Vietnam. (The one in Laos is already functional)

The following proposals were announced by the Prime Minister at the 4th ASEAN-India Summit:

- Setting up centres for English Language Training (ELT) in Cambodia, Laos, Burma and Vietnam.
- Setting up a telemedicine and tele-education network for Cambodia, Burma, Laos and Vietnam.
- Organising special training courses for diplomats from ASEAN countries.
- Organising an India-ASEAN Technology Summit in 2006.
- Organising education fairs and road shows in ASEAN countries.
- Conducting an India-ASEAN IT Ministerial and Industry Forum in 2006.

The ASEAN region has an abundance of natural resources and significant technological skills. These provide a natural base for the integration between ASEAN and India in both trade and investment. The present level of bilateral trade with ASEAN of nearly US$18 billion is reportedly increasing by about 25% per year. India hopes to reach the level of US$30 billion by 2007. India is also improving its relations with the help of other policy decisions like offers of lines of credit, better connectivity through the air (open skies policy), and rail and road links.

India's prime minister Narendra Modi declared 2026 the ASEAN-India Year Of Maritime Cooperation during the 47th ASEAN summit.

=== West ===
Armenia

PM Modi holds a bilateral meeting with the Prime Minister of the Republic of Armenia, Mr. Nikol Pashinyan at SCO Summit in Bishkek, Kyrgyzstan on August 31, 2026.

India established diplomatic relations with Armenia in December 1992. It wasn't recognised by some countries, including Pakistan, while most of the nations did. As of the earliest days of the Silk Route, there have been strong cultural, moral, and other traditional relations among the nations. It fully supports India's bid for a permanent seat in UNSC and even completely supports India on Kashmir conflicts. There exists a small community of Armenians in India while there is also a small community of Indians in Armenia.

Azerbaijan

India has an embassy in Baku, and Azerbaijan has an embassy in New Delhi. Both have been connected through ancient cultural links and trade routes (especially the Silk Route).

Bahrain

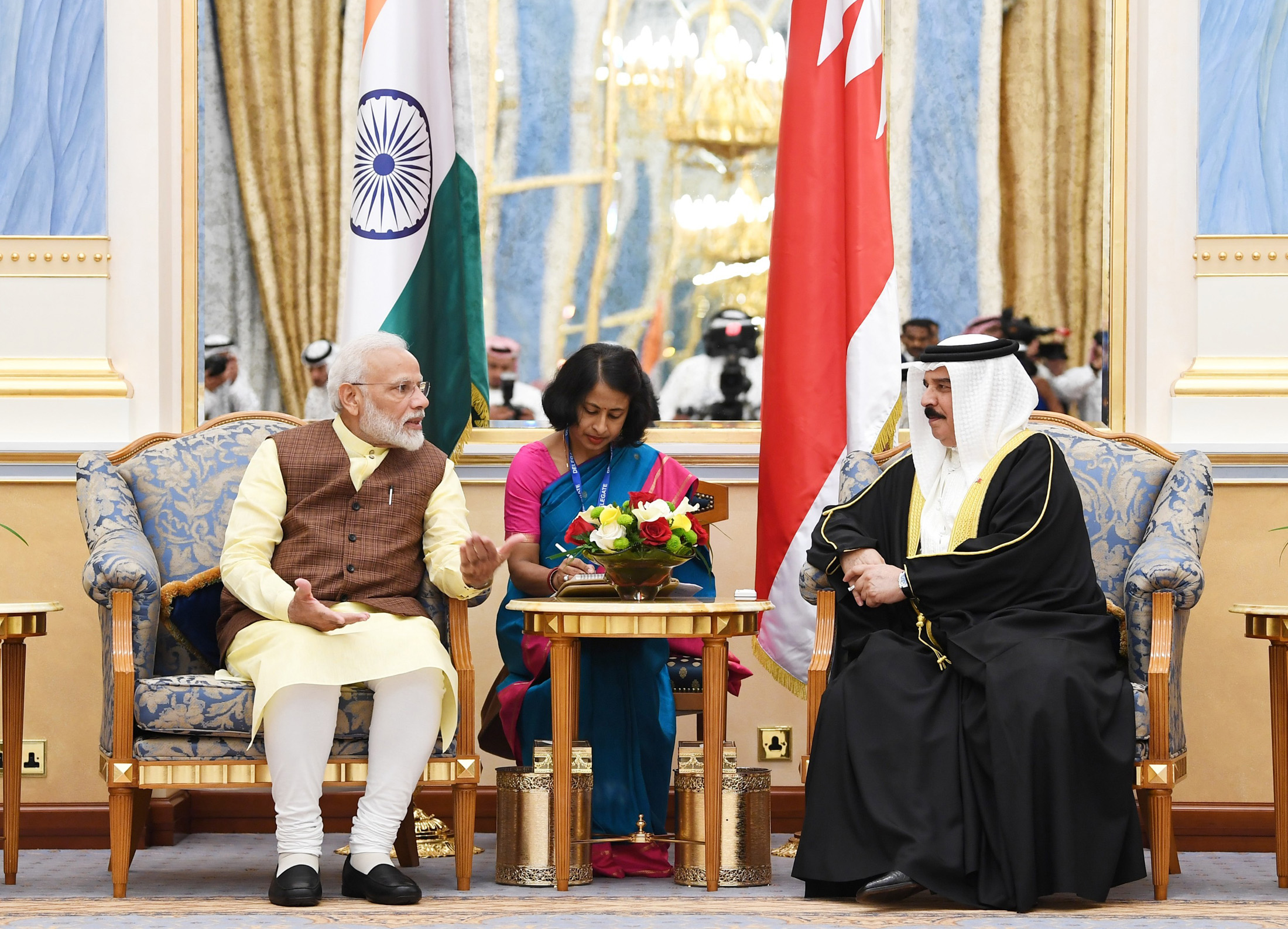
The Prime Minister, Shri Narendra Modi meeting the King of Bahrain, King Hamad bin Isa Al Khalifa, at Al Gudaibiya Palace, in Manama, Bahrain on August 24, 2019.

India is a close ally of Bahrain, the Kingdom along with its GCC partners are (according to Indian officials) among the most prominent backers of India's bid for a permanent seat on the UN Security Council, and Bahraini officials have urged India to play a greater role in international affairs. For instance, over concerns about Iran's nuclear programme, Bahrain's Crown Prince appealed to India to play an active role in resolving the crisis.

Ties between India and Bahrain go back generations, with many of Bahrain's most prominent figures having close connections: poet and constitutionalist Ebrahim Al-Arrayedh grew up in Bombay, while 17th-century Bahraini theologians Sheikh Salih Al-Karzakani and Sheikh Ja'far bin Kamal al-Din were influential figures in the Kingdom of Golkonda and the development of Shia thought in the sub-continent.

Bahraini politicians have sought to enhance these long-standing ties, with Parliamentary Speaker Khalifa Al Dhahrani in 2007 leading a delegation of parliamentarians and business leaders to meet the then Indian president Pratibha Patil, the then opposition leader L K Advani, and take part in training and media interviews. Politically, it is easier for Bahrain's politicians to seek training and advice from India than it is from the United States or other Western alternatives.

Adding further strength to the ties, Sheikh Hamad Bin Isa Al-Khalifa visited India, during which MOUs and bilateral deals worth $450 million were approved. India expressed its support for Bahrain's bid for a non-permanent seat in the UNSC in 2026–27.

Cyprus

PM Modi and the President of Cyprus, Mr. Nikos Christodoulides take a tour of the Historic Centre of Nicosia, in Cyprus on June 16, 2025.

- Cyprus has a High Commission in New Delhi and 2 honorary consulates (in Mumbai and Kolkata).
- India has a High Commission in Nicosia.
- Both countries are full members of the Commonwealth of Nations.
- Cypriot Ministry of Foreign Affairs: list of bilateral treaties with India

India supported Cyprus during its struggle for independence from British colonial rule. India supported the Greeks in Cyprus during the Turkish invasion of Cyprus in 1974 and lobbied for the international recognition of the Government of Nicosia as the sole legal representative of the entire nation. India has consistently supported and voted for a peaceful resolution of the Cyprus dispute at the United Nations.

Georgia

- Georgia has an embassy in New Delhi.
- India is represented in Georgia through its embassy in Yerevan (Armenia) and an honorary consulate in Tbilisi.
- Georgian Ministry of Foreign Affairs about relations with India

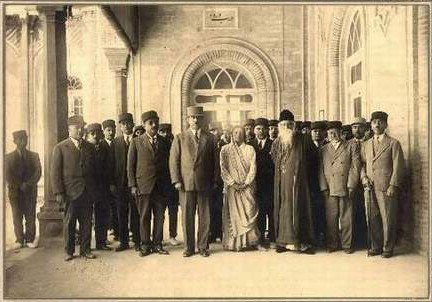
Rabindranath Tagore as a guest of Iran's parliament in the 1930s.

Iran

Independent India and Iran established diplomatic links on 15 March 1950. After the Iranian Revolution of 1979, Iran withdrew from CENTO and dissociated itself from US-friendly countries, including Pakistan, which automatically meant an improved relationship with the Republic of India.

Currently, the two countries have friendly relations in many areas. There are significant trade ties, particularly in crude oil imports into India and diesel exports to Iran. Iran frequently objected to Pakistan's attempts to draft anti-India resolutions at international organisations such as the OIC. India welcomed Iran's inclusion as an observer state in the SAARC regional organisation. Lucknow continues to be a major centre of Shiite culture and Persian study in the subcontinent.

In the 1990s, India and Iran both supported the Northern Alliance in Afghanistan against the Taliban regime. They continue to collaborate in supporting the broad-based anti-Taliban government led by Hamid Karzai and backed by the United States.

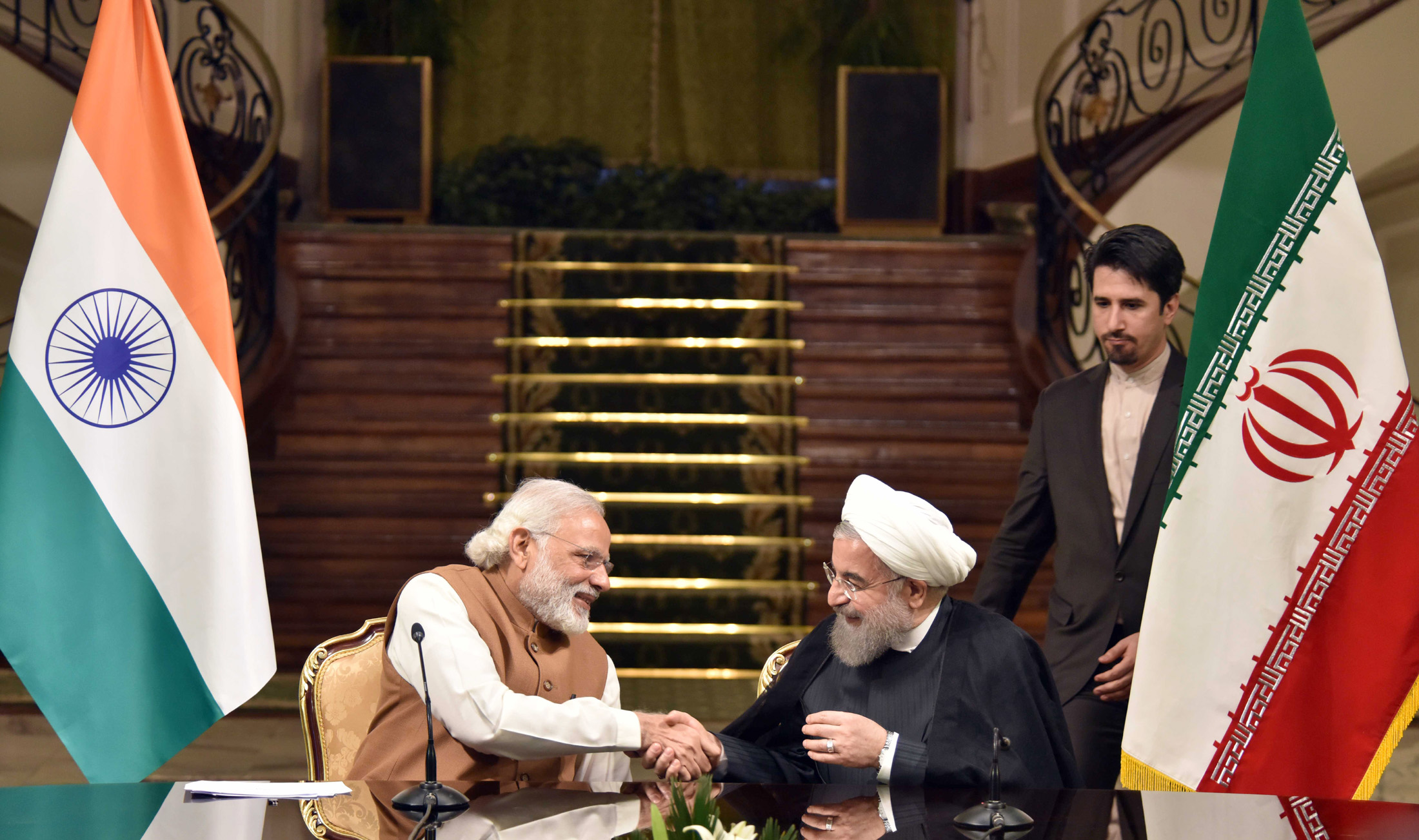
PM Narendra Modi with Former President of Iran, Hassan Rouhani, in Tehran. (2016)

However, one complex issue in Indo-Iran relations is the issue of Iran's nuclear programme. In this intricate issue, India tries to strike a delicate balance. According to Rejaul Laskar, an Indian expert on international relations, "India's position on Iran's nuclear programme has been consistent, principled and balanced, and makes an endeavour to reconcile Iran's quest for energy security with the international community's concerns on proliferation. So, while India acknowledges and supports Iran's ambitions to achieve energy security and in particular, its quest for peaceful use of nuclear energy, it is also India's principled position that Iran must meet all its obligations under international law, particularly its obligations under the nuclear Non-Proliferation Treaty (NPT) and other such treaties to which it is a signatory"

Following an attack on an Israeli diplomat in India in February 2012, the Delhi Police contended that the Iranian Revolutionary Guard Corps had some involvement in the attack. This was subsequently confirmed in July 2012, after a report by the Delhi Police found evidence that members of the Iranian Revolutionary Guard Corps had been involved in the 13 February bomb attack in the capital.

Iraq

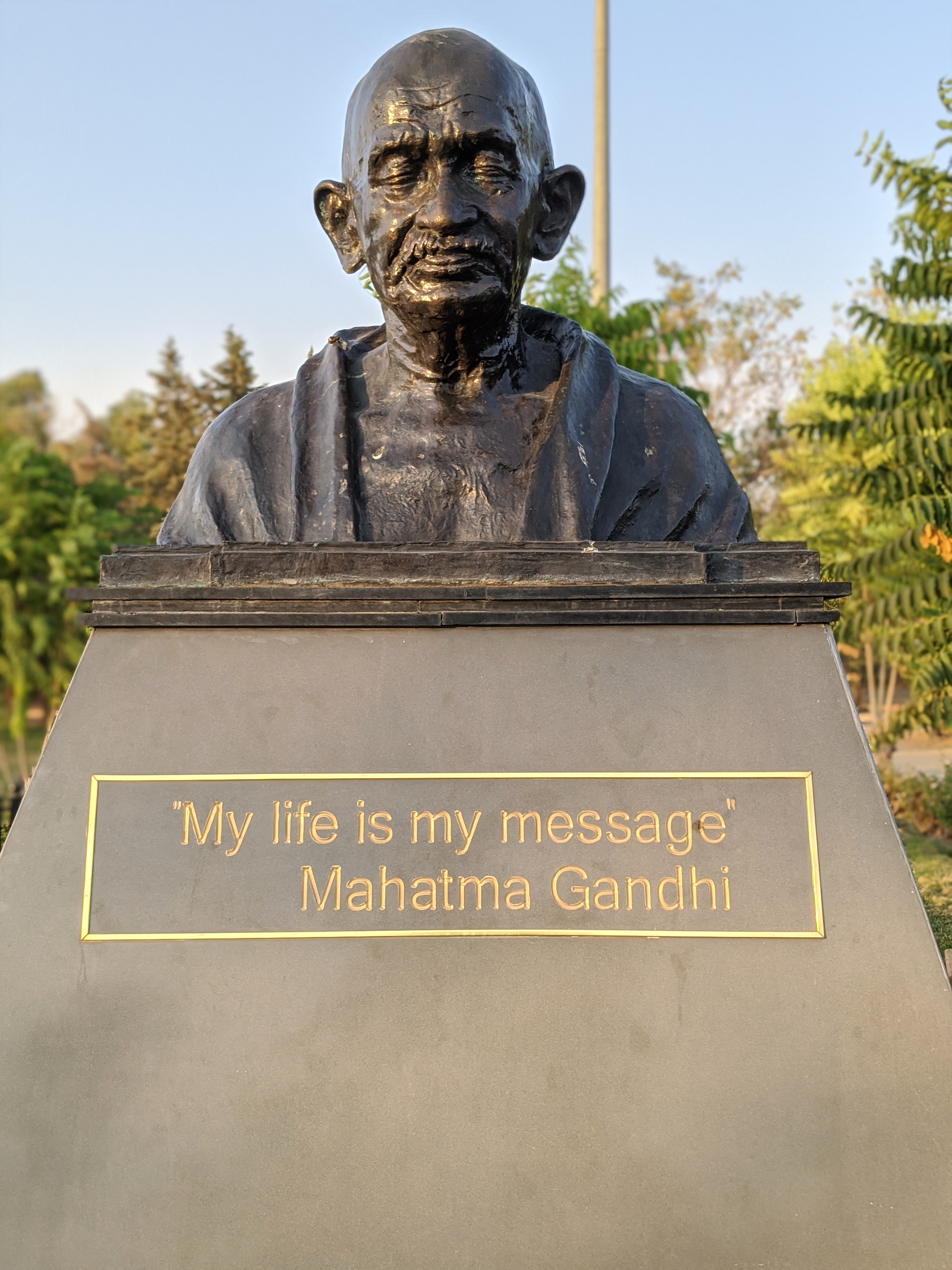
Gandhi statue in Erbil, Iraqi Kurdistan

Iraq was one of the few countries in the Middle East with which India established diplomatic relations at the embassy level immediately after its independence in 1947. Both nations signed the "Treaty of Perpetual Peace and Friendship" in 1952 and an agreement of cooperation on cultural affairs in 1954. India was amongst the first to recognise the Ba'ath Party-led government, and Iraq remained neutral during the Indo-Pakistani War of 1965. However, Iraq sided alongside other Persian Gulf states in supporting Pakistan against India during the Indo-Pakistani War of 1971, which saw the creation of Bangladesh. The eight-year-long Iran–Iraq War caused a steep decline in trade and commerce between the two nations.

During the 1991 Persian Gulf War, India remained neutral but permitted refuelling for US aircraft. It opposed UN sanctions on Iraq, but the period of war and Iraq's isolation further diminished India's commercial and diplomatic ties. From 1999 onwards, Iraq and India began to work towards a stronger relationship. Iraq had supported India's right to conduct nuclear tests following its tests of five nuclear weapons on 11 and 13 May 1998. In 2000, the then-Vice-President of Iraq Taha Yassin Ramadan visited India, and on 6 August 2002 President Saddam Hussein conveyed Iraq's "unwavering support" to India over the Kashmir conflict with Pakistan. India and Iraq established joint ministerial committees and trade delegations to promote extensive bilateral cooperation. Although initially disrupted during the 2003 invasion of Iraq, diplomatic and commercial ties between India and the new democratic government of Iraq have since been normalised.

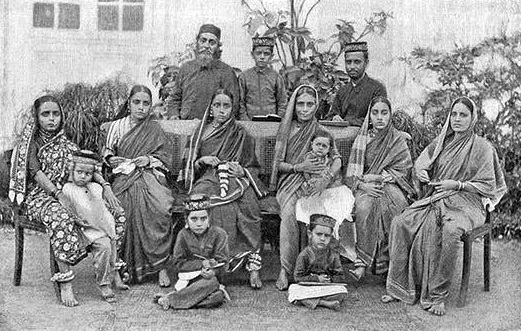
A Beni-Israel family in Bombay

Israel

The establishment of Israel at the end of World War II was a complex issue. Based on its own experience during partition, when 14 million people were displaced and an estimated 200,000 to 500,000 people were killed in Punjab Province, India had recommended a single state, as did Iran and Yugoslavia (later to undergo its genocidal partition). The state could allocate Arab- and Jewish-majority provinces to prevent the partition of historic Palestine and prevent widespread conflict. But, the final UN resolution recommended the partition of Mandatory Palestine into Arab and Jewish states based on religious and ethnic majorities. India opposed this in the final vote as it did not agree with the concept of partition based on religion.

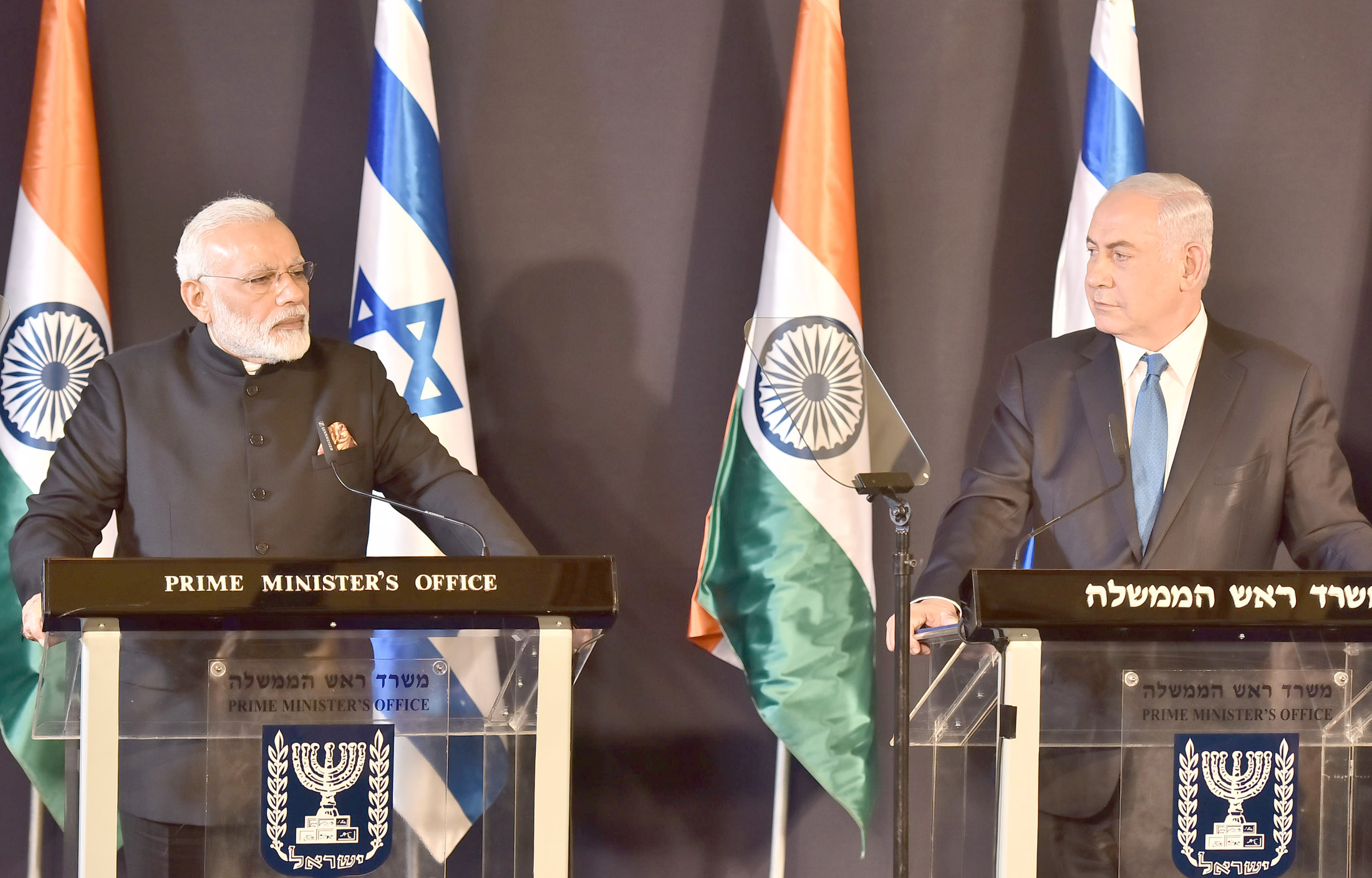
PM Narendra Modi, with Former Prime Minister of Israel, Benjamin Netanyahu, during a press meet, in Jerusalem, (2017)

Due to the security threat from a US-backed Pakistan and its nuclear programme in the 1980s, Israel and India started a clandestine relationship that involved cooperation between their respective intelligence agencies. Israel shared India's concerns about the growing danger posed by Pakistan and nuclear proliferation to Iran and other Arab states.

Since the establishment of full diplomatic relations with Israel in 1992, India has improved its relationship with the Jewish state. India is regarded as Israel's strongest ally in Asia, and Israel is India's second-largest arms supplier. Since India achieved its independence in 1947, it has supported Palestinian self-determination. India recognised Palestine's statehood following Palestine's declaration on 18 November 1988 and Indo-Palestinian relations was first established in 1974. This has not adversely affected India's improved relations with Israel.

India entertained the Israeli Prime Minister in a visit in 2003, and Israel has entertained Indian dignitaries such as Finance Minister Jaswant Singh in diplomatic visits. India and Israel collaborate in scientific and technological endeavours. Israel's Minister for Science and Technology has expressed interest in collaborating with the Indian Space Research Organisation (ISRO) towards using satellites to better manage land and other resources. Israel has also expressed interest in participating in ISRO's Chandrayaan Mission involving an uncrewed mission to the moon. On 21 January 2008, India successfully launched an Israeli spy satellite into orbit from the Sriharikota space station in southern India.

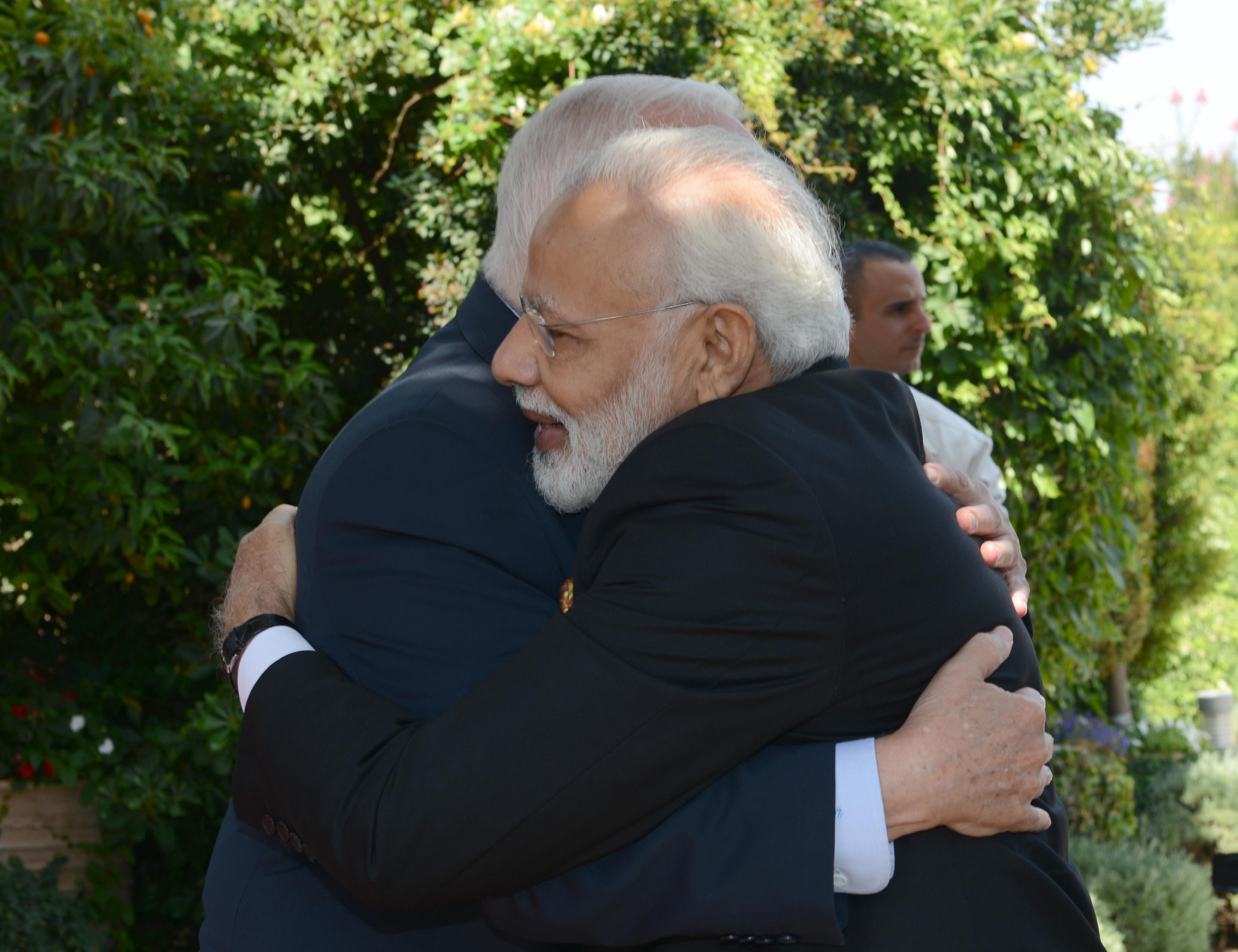
Narendra Modi's warm visit to Israel, hugging Former President Reuven Rivlin in 2017

Israel and India share intelligence on terrorist groups. They have developed close defence and security ties since establishing diplomatic relations in 1992. India has bought more than $5 billion worth of Israeli equipment since 2002. In addition, Israel is training Indian military units and in 2008 was discussing an arrangement to give Indian commandos instruction in counter-terrorist tactics and urban warfare. In December 2008, Israel and India signed a memorandum to set up an Indo-Israel Legal Colloquium to facilitate discussions and exchange programmes between judges and jurists of the two countries.

Following the Israeli invasion of Lebanon in 2006, India stated that the Israeli use of force was "disproportionate and excessive".

The India-Israel relationship has been very close and warm under the premiership of Narendra Modi since 2014. In 2017, he was the first ever Prime Minister of India to visit Israel.

Lebanon

India and Lebanon enjoy cordial and friendly relations based on many complementarities such as a political system based on parliamentary democracy, non-alignment, human rights, commitment to a just world order, regional and global peace, a liberal market economy and a vibrant entrepreneurial spirit. India has a peacekeeping force as part of the United Nations Interim Force in Lebanon (UNIFIL). One infantry battalion is deployed in Lebanon and about 900 personnel are stationed in the Eastern part of Southern Lebanon. The force also provided non-patrol aid to citizens. India and Lebanon have had very good relations since the 1950s.

Oman

PM Modi and His Majesty Sultan Haitham bin Tariq witnessing Comprehensive Economic Partnership Agreement between India and Oman at Muscat, in Oman on December 18, 2025.

India–Oman relations are foreign relations between India and the Sultanate of Oman. India has an embassy in Muscat, Oman. The Indian consulate was opened in Muscat in February 1955, and five years later it was upgraded to a consulate general and later developed into a full-fledged embassy in 1971. The first Ambassador of India arrived in Muscat in 1973. Oman established its embassy in New Delhi in 1972 and a consulate general in Mumbai in 1976.

$5.6 bn Oman-India energy pipeline plans progressing: Fox Petroleum Group envisions a roughly five-year timeframe for the execution of the pipeline project.

Ajay Kumar, the chairman and managing director of Fox Petroleum, based in New Delhi, which is an associate company of Fox Petroleum FZC in the UAE, said that Mr. Modi had "fired the best weapon of economic development and growth". "He has given a red carpet for global players to invest in India," Mr. Kumar added. "It will boost all sectors of the industry – especially for small-scale manufacturing units and heavy industries too."

Saudi Arabia

Bilateral relations between India and Saudi Arabia have strengthened considerably owing to cooperation in regional affairs and trade. Saudi Arabia is one of the largest suppliers of oil to India, which is one of the top seven trading partners and the 5th biggest investor in Saudi Arabia.

India was one of the first nations to establish ties with the Third Saudi State. During the 1930s, India heavily funded Nejd through financial subsidies.

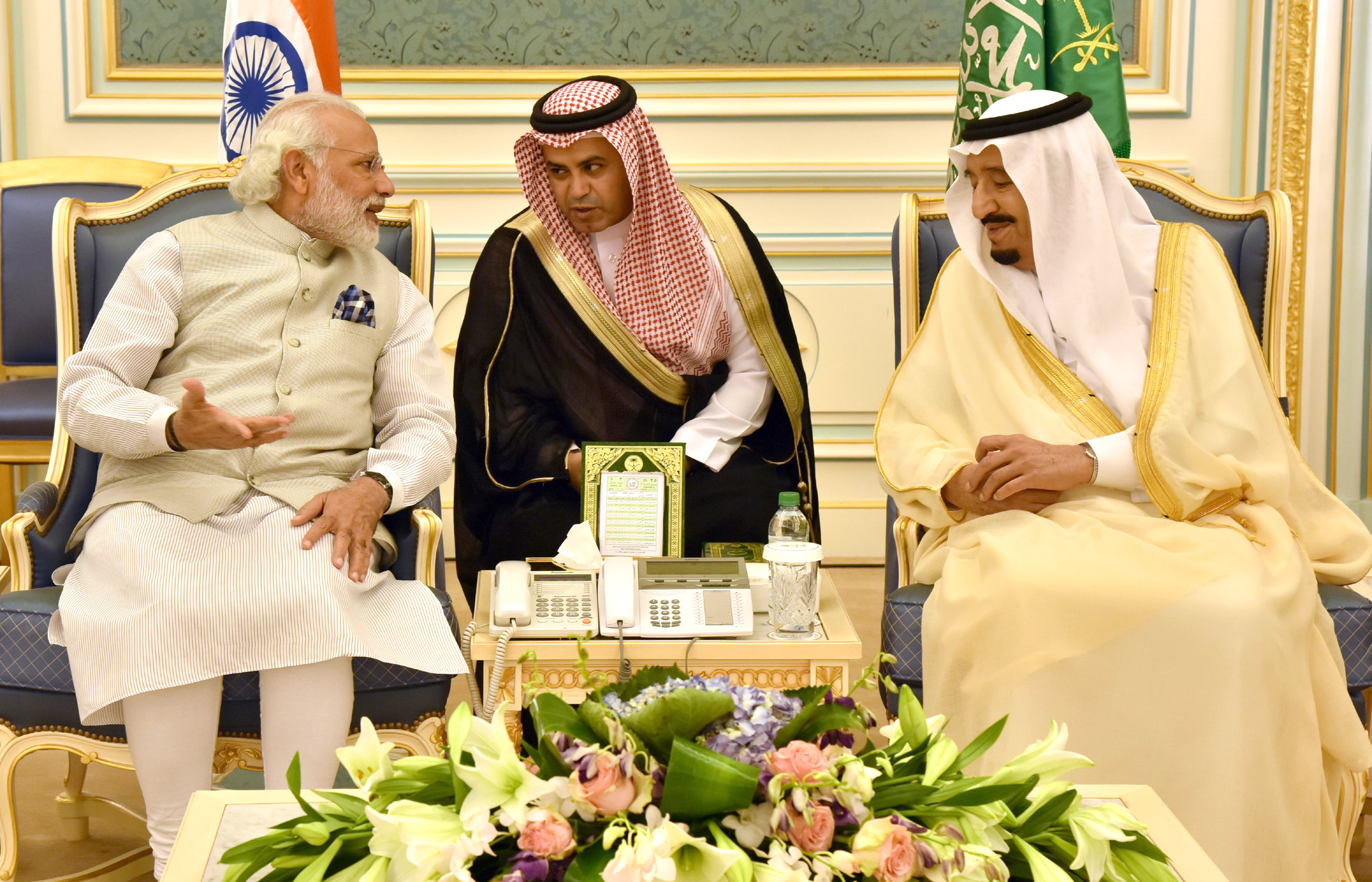
Prime Minister Narendra Modi in conversation with King Salman bin Abdul Aziz Al Saud of Saudi Arabia

India's strategic relations with Saudi Arabia have been affected by the latter's close ties with Pakistan. Saudi Arabia supported Pakistan's stance on the Kashmir conflict during the Indo-Pakistani War of 1971 at the expense of its relations with India. The Soviet Union's close relations with India also served as a source of consternation. During the Persian Gulf War (1990–91), India officially maintained neutrality. Saudi Arabia's close military and strategic ties with Pakistan have also been a source of continuing strain.

Since the 1990s, both nations have taken steps to improve ties. Saudi Arabia has supported granting observer status to India in the Organisation of Islamic Cooperation (OIC) and has expanded its cooperation with India to fight terrorism. In January 2006, King Abdullah of Saudi Arabia made a special visit to India, becoming the first Saudi monarch in 51 years to do so. The Saudi king and former Prime Minister of India Manmohan Singh signed an agreement forging a strategic energy partnership that was termed the "Delhi Declaration". The pact provides for a "reliable, stable and increased volume of crude oil supplies to India through long-term contracts." Both nations also agreed on joint ventures and the development of oil and natural gas in public and private sectors. An Indo-Saudi joint declaration in the Indian capital New Delhi described the king's visit as "heralding a new era in India-Saudi Arabia relations".

Syria

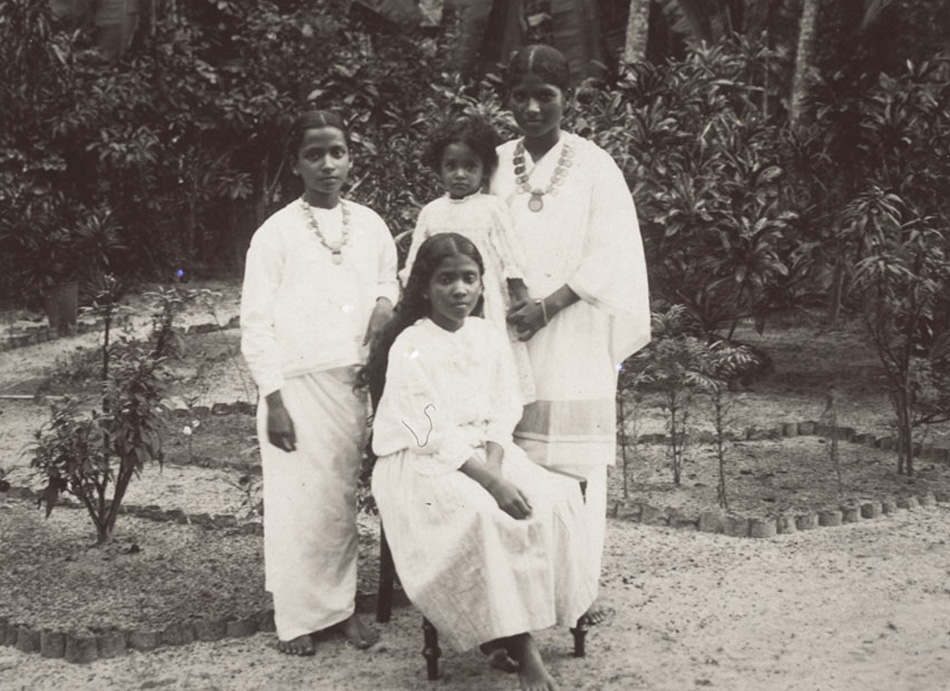
Syrian Christian Women in Kerala (1912)

Bilateral relations between India and Syria are historic, and the two have ancient civilizational ties. Both countries were on the Silk Road through which civilizational exchanges took place for centuries. Syriac Christianity, originating in ancient Syria, spread further to the East and created the first Christian communities in ancient India. The ancient Syriac language among the Syrian Christians of Kerala was also brought to Kerala by St Thomas in the 1st century CE. Even today, the language continues to be taught in colleges and universities in Kerala.

A common nationalism and secular orientation, membership of NAM and similar perceptions on many issues further strengthened the bond between the two states. India supported "Syria's legitimate right to regain the occupied Golan Heights". In turn, this was reciprocated with Syrian recognition that Kashmir is a bilateral issue as well as general support of India's concerns and even candidature at various international forums.

Turkey

Due to controversial issues such as Turkey's close relationship with Pakistan, relations between the two countries have often been strained at certain times, but better at others. India and Turkey's relationship alternates from uncertainty to collaboration when the two nations work together to combat terrorism in Central and South Asia, and the Middle East. India and Turkey are also connected by history, seeing as they have known each other since the days of the Ottoman Empire, and seeing as India was one of the countries to send aid to Turkey following its war of independence. The Indian real estate firm GMR has invested in and is working towards the modernisation of Istanbul's Sabiha Gökçen International Airport.

The relations took a nose-dive after Turkish President Recep Tayyip Erdoğan spoke against India on the Kashmir issue and supported Pakistan, during his address at United Nations General Assembly after Pakistan PM Imran Khan, in September 2019. In February 2020, he visited Islamabad and held talks with Imran Khan on "improving and bolstering the relations with Islamabad". At the end of the month, during the riots in Delhi and CAA-NRC protests in India, he criticised the government for its policies. He also criticised the move of the Indian Government on the Galwan Valley skirmishes with China on the LAC.

United Arab Emirates

The President, Shri Pranab Mukherjee and the Prime Minister, Shri Narendra Modi with the Chief Guest of the Republic Day, The Crown Prince of Abu Dhabi, Deputy Supreme Commander of U.A.E. Armed Forces, General Sheikh Mohammed Bin Zayed Al Nahyan, at Rajpath, on the occasion of the 68th Republic Day Parade 2017, in New Delhi.

India–United Arab Emirates relations refer to the bilateral relations that exist between the Republic of India and the United Arab Emirates. After the creation of the Federation in 1971, India-UAE relations flourished. Today, UAE and India share political, economic, and cultural links. There are over a million Indians in the United Arab Emirates, making them by far the largest migrant group in the country.[1] A large Indian expatriate community resides and engages in the UAE in economically productive activities and has played a significant role in the evolution of the UAE. In 2008–09, India emerged as the largest trade partner of the UAE with bilateral trade between the two countries exceeding US$44.5 billion. [9] UAE and India are each other's main trading partners. The trade totals over $75 billion (AED275.25 billion).

Arab states of the Persian Gulf

India and the Arab states of the Persian Gulf enjoy strong cultural and economic ties. This is reflected in the fact that more than 50% of the oil consumed by India comes from the Persian Gulf countries and Indian nationals form the largest expatriate community in the Arabian peninsula. The annual remittance by Indian expatriates in the region amounted to US$20 billion in 2007. India is one of the largest trading partners of the CCASG with non-oil trade between India and Dubai alone amounting to US$19 billion in 2007. The Persian Gulf countries have also played an important role in addressing India's energy security concerns, with Saudi Arabia and Kuwait regularly increasing their oil supply to India to meet the country's rising energy demand. In 2005, Kuwait increased its oil exports to India by 10%, increasing the net oil trade between the two to US$4.5 billion. In 2008, Qatar decided to invest US$5 billion in India's energy sector.

India has maritime security arrangements in place with Oman and Qatar. In 2008, a landmark defence pact was signed, under which India committed its military assets to protect "Qatar from external threats". There has been progress in a proposed deep-sea gas pipeline from Qatar, via Oman, to India.

== Europe ==
Albania

Austria

Prime Minister Narendra Modi meeting with Federal President Austria, Dr. Alexander Van der Bellen in Vienna, Austria on July 10, 2024.

Austria–India relations refer to the bilateral ties between Austria and India. Indo-Austrian relations were established in May 1949 by the first Prime Minister of India Jawaharlal Nehru and the Chancellor of Austria Leopold Figl. Historically, Indo-Austrian ties have been particularly strong and India intervened in June 1953 in Austria's favour whilst negotiations were going on with the Soviet Union about the Austrian State Treaty. There is a fully functioning Indian embassy in Vienna, Austria's capital, which is concurrently accredited to the United Nations offices in the city. Austria is represented in India by its embassy and Trade Commission in New Delhi, India's capital, as well as honorary consulates in Mumbai, Kolkata, Chennai and Goa.

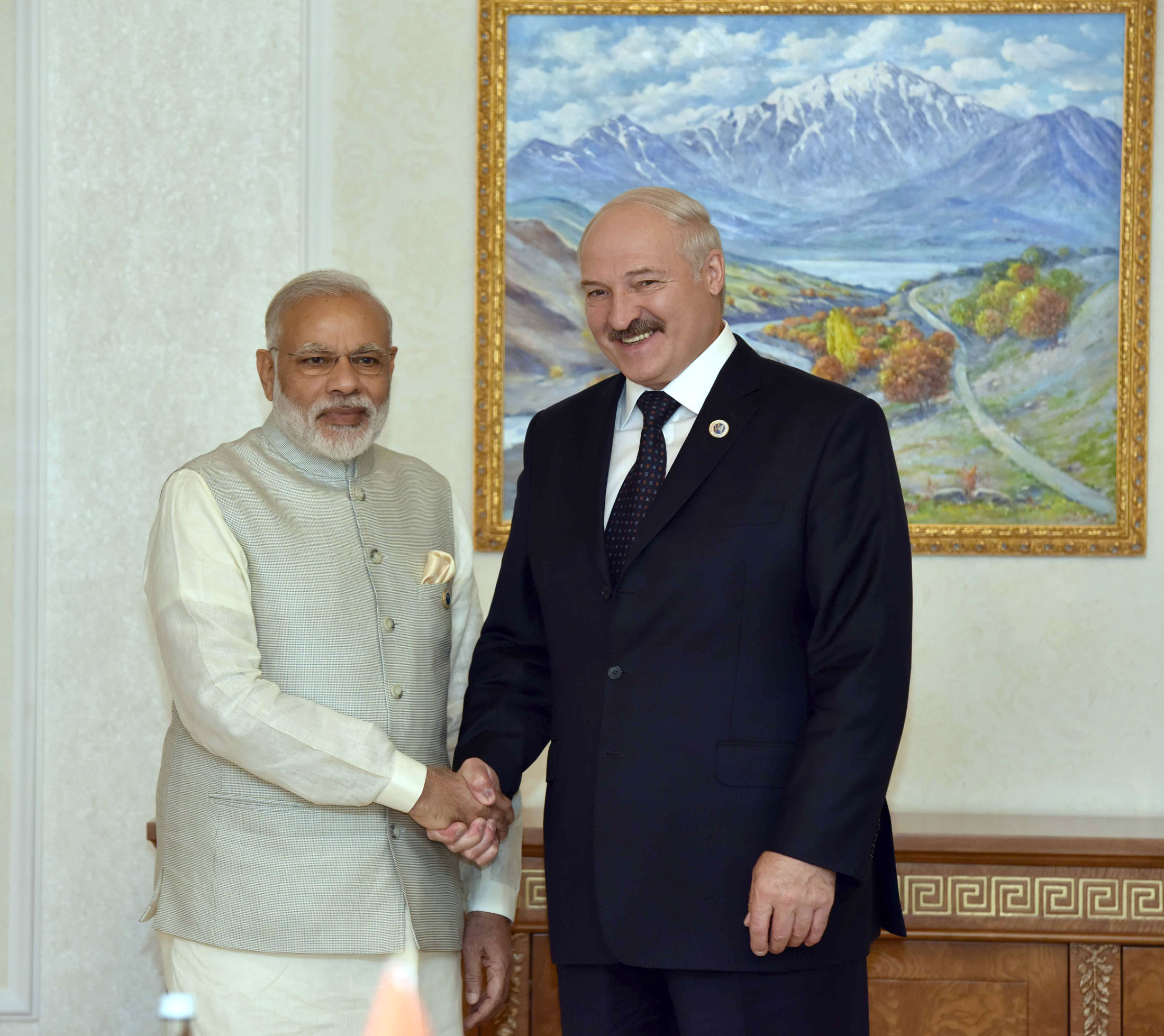
Indian Prime Minister Narendra Modi and Belarus President Alexander Lukashenko.

Belarus

Belarus has an embassy in New Delhi. Since 14 May 1992, India has an embassy in Minsk.

Belgium

Belgium has an embassy in New Delhi, consulates in Chennai and Mumbai, and an honorary consulate in Kolkata. India has an embassy in Brussels.

Bosnia and Herzegovina

Bulgaria

Bulgaria has an embassy in New Delhi and an honorary consulate in Kolkata. India has an embassy in Sofia.

Croatia

Since February 1995, Croatia has an embassy in New Delhi and an honorary consulate in Mumbai. Since 28 April 1996, India has an embassy in Zagreb.

Czech Republic

Czech-Indian relations were established in 1921 by a consulate in Bombay. The Czech Republic has an embassy in New Delhi. Consulates of the Czech Republic in India are in Chennai, Mumbai and Kolkata. India has an embassy in Prague.

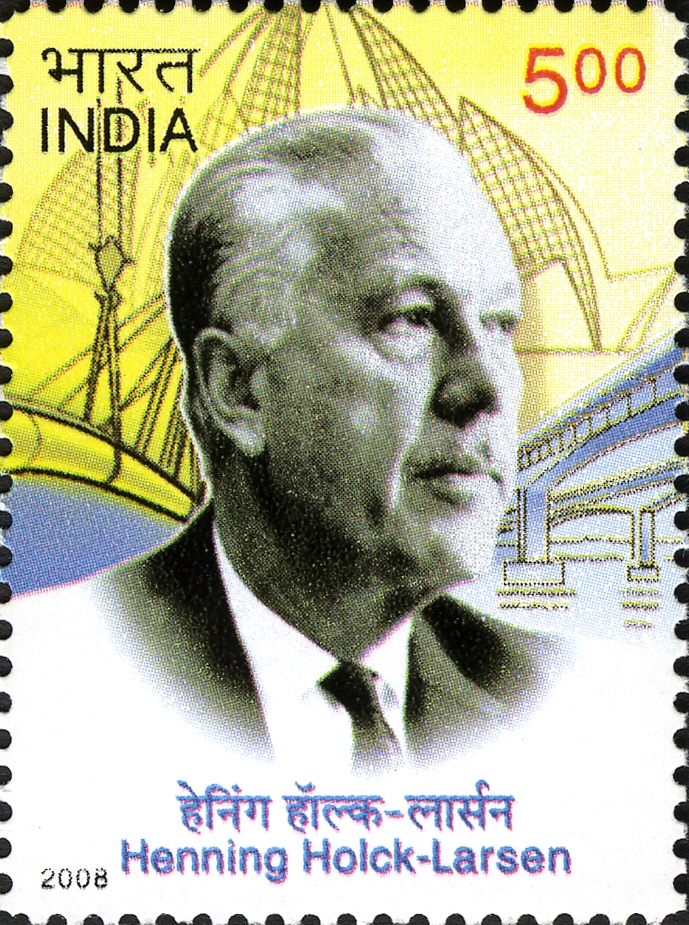
India released a stamp commemorating Henning Holck-Larsen, founder of Larsen & Toubro.

Denmark

Denmark has an embassy in New Delhi, and India has an embassy in Copenhagen.

Tranquebar, a town in the southern Indian state of Tamil Nadu, was a Danish colony in India from 1620 to 1845. It is spelled Trankebar or Tranquebar in Danish, which comes from the native Tamil, Tarangambadi, meaning "place of the singing waves". It was sold, along with the other Danish settlements in mainland India, most notably Serampore (now in West Bengal), to Great Britain in 1845. The Nicobar Islands were also colonised by Denmark until sold to the British in 1868, who made them part of the British Indian Empire.

After Independence in 1947, Indian prime minister Jawaharlal Nehru's visit to Denmark in 1957 laid the foundation for a friendly relationship between India and Denmark that has endured ever since. The bilateral relations between India and Denmark are cordial and friendly, based on synergies in political, economic, academic, and research fields. There have been periodic high-level visits between the two countries.

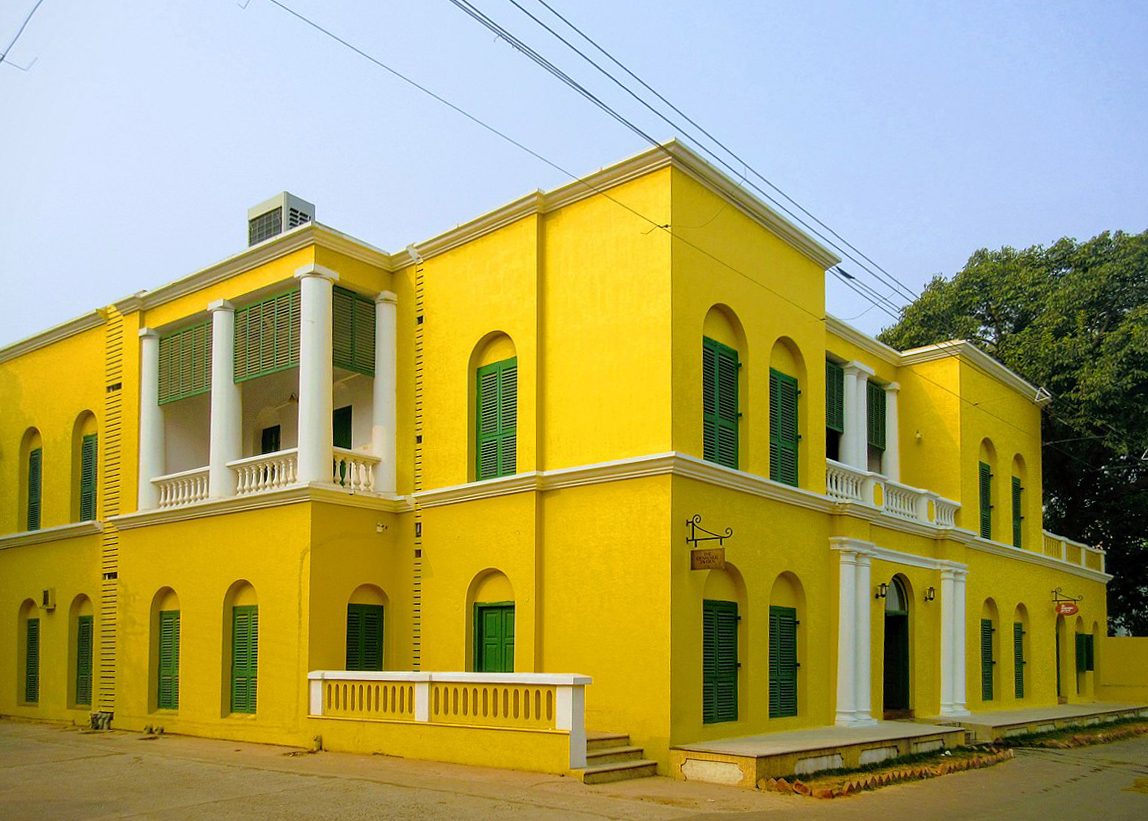
The Denmark Tavern of Serampore in West Bengal

Anders Fogh Rasmussen, former Prime Minister of Denmark, accompanied by a large business delegation, paid a state visit to India from 4 to 8 February 2008. He visited Infosys, Biocon and IIM Bangalore in Bangalore and Agra. He launched an 'India Action Plan', which called for strengthening of the political dialogue, strengthening of cooperation in trade and investments, research in science and technology, energy, climate and environment, culture, education, student exchanges and attracting skilled manpower and IT experts to Denmark for short periods. The two countries signed an Agreement for the establishment of a Bilateral Joint Commission for Cooperation.

In July 2012, the Government of India decided to scale down its diplomatic ties with Denmark after that country refused to appeal in its Supreme Court against a decision of its lower court rejecting the extradition of Purulia arms drop case prime accused Kim Davy a.k.a. Niels Holck. Agitated over Denmark's refusal to act on India's repeated requests to appeal in its apex court to facilitate Davy's extradition to India, the government issued a circular directing all senior officials not to meet or entertain any Danish diplomat posted in India.

Estonia

India's first recognition of Estonia came on 22 September 1921 when the former had just acquired membership in the League of Nations. India re-recognised Estonia on 9 September 1991, and diplomatic relations were established on 2 December of the same year in Helsinki. Neither country has a resident ambassador. Estonia is represented in India by an embassy in New Delhi and one honorary consulate in Mumbai. India is represented in Estonia through its embassy in Helsinki (Finland) and an honorary consulate in Tallinn.

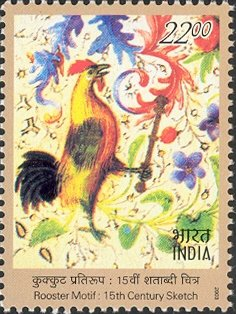
Rooster Motif 15th Century Sketch

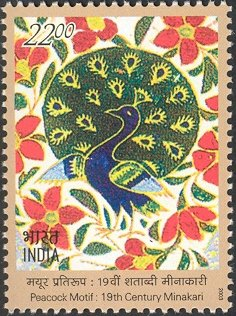
Peacock Motif 19th Century Minakari

India France Joint Issue - 2003 - Commemorating relationship.

France

France and India established diplomatic relations before India's independence from the British Empire on 17 February 1947. France's Indian possessions were returned to India after a treaty of cession was signed by the two countries in May 1956. On 16 August 1962, India and France exchanged the instruments of ratification under which France ceded to India full sovereignty over the territories it held. Pondicherry and the other enclaves of Karaikal, Mahe and Yanam came to be administered as the Union Territory of Puducherry on 1 July 1963.

The President of India, Smt Droupadi Murmu received His Excellency Mr Emmanuel Macron, the President of the French Republic at Rashtrapati Bhavan on January 26, 2024

France, Russia and Israel were the only countries that did not condemn India's decision to go nuclear in 1998. In 2003, France became the largest supplier of nuclear fuel and technology to India and remains a large military and economic trade partner. India's candidacy for permanent membership in the UN Security Council has found very strong support from former French President Nicolas Sarkozy. The Indian Government's decisions to purchase French Scorpène-class submarines worth US$3 billion and 43 Airbus aircraft for Air India worth US$2.5 billion have further cemented the strategic, military and economic cooperation between India and France.

PM Narendra Modi meeting with the President of France, Mr. Emmanuel Macron on the sidelines of the India AI Impact Summit, in New Delhi on February 19, 2026.

France's decision to ban schoolchildren from wearing headdresses and veils had the unintended consequence of affecting Sikh children who have been refused entry into public schools. The Indian Government, citing the historic traditions of the Sikh community, has requested French authorities to review the situation to not exclude Sikh children from education.

President Nicolas Sarkozy and François Hollande visited India in January 2008 and 2016 respectively as the Chief Guest of the annual Republic Day parade in New Delhi. France was the first country to sign a nuclear energy cooperation agreement with India; this was done during Prime Minister Singh's visit, following the waiver by the Nuclear Suppliers Group. During the Bastille Day celebrations on 14 July 2009, a detachment of 400 Indian troops marched alongside the French troops, and the then Indian Prime Minister Manmohan Singh was the guest of honour.

Finland

India has an embassy in Helsinki. Finland has an embassy in New Delhi and three honorary consulates in Kolkata, Chennai, and Mumbai.

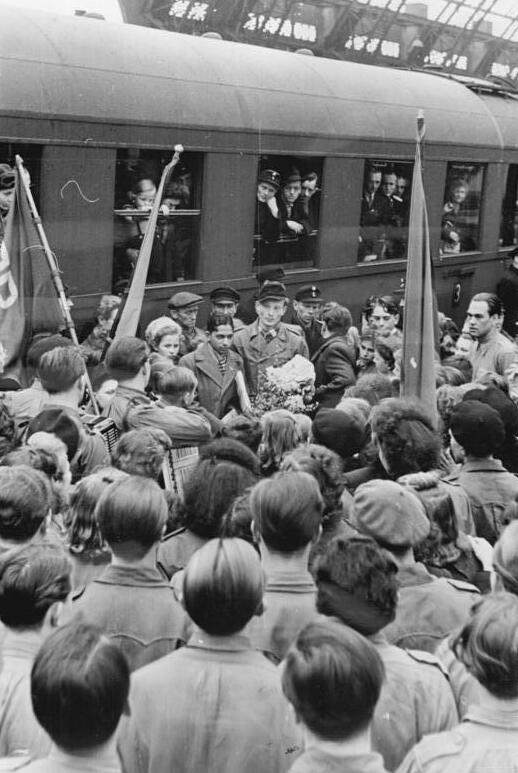
Arrival of the first Indian student to Dresden, East Germany, in 1951

Germany

During the Cold War, India maintained diplomatic relations with both West Germany and East Germany. Since the fall of the Berlin Wall and the reunification of Germany, relations have further improved.

Germany is India's largest trade partner in Europe. Between 2004 and 2013, Indo-German trade grew in volume but dropped in importance. According to Indian Ministry of Commerce MX data: Total trade between India and Germany was $5.5 billion (3.8% share of Indian trade and ranked 6) in 2004 and $21.6 billion (2.6% share of Indian trade and ranked 9) in 2013. Indian exports to Germany were $2.54 billion (3.99%, ranked 6) in 2004 and $7.3billion (2.41%, ranked 10) in 2013. Indian imports from Germany were $2.92 billion (3.73% ranked 6) in 2004 and $14.33 billion (2.92% ranked 10) in 2013.

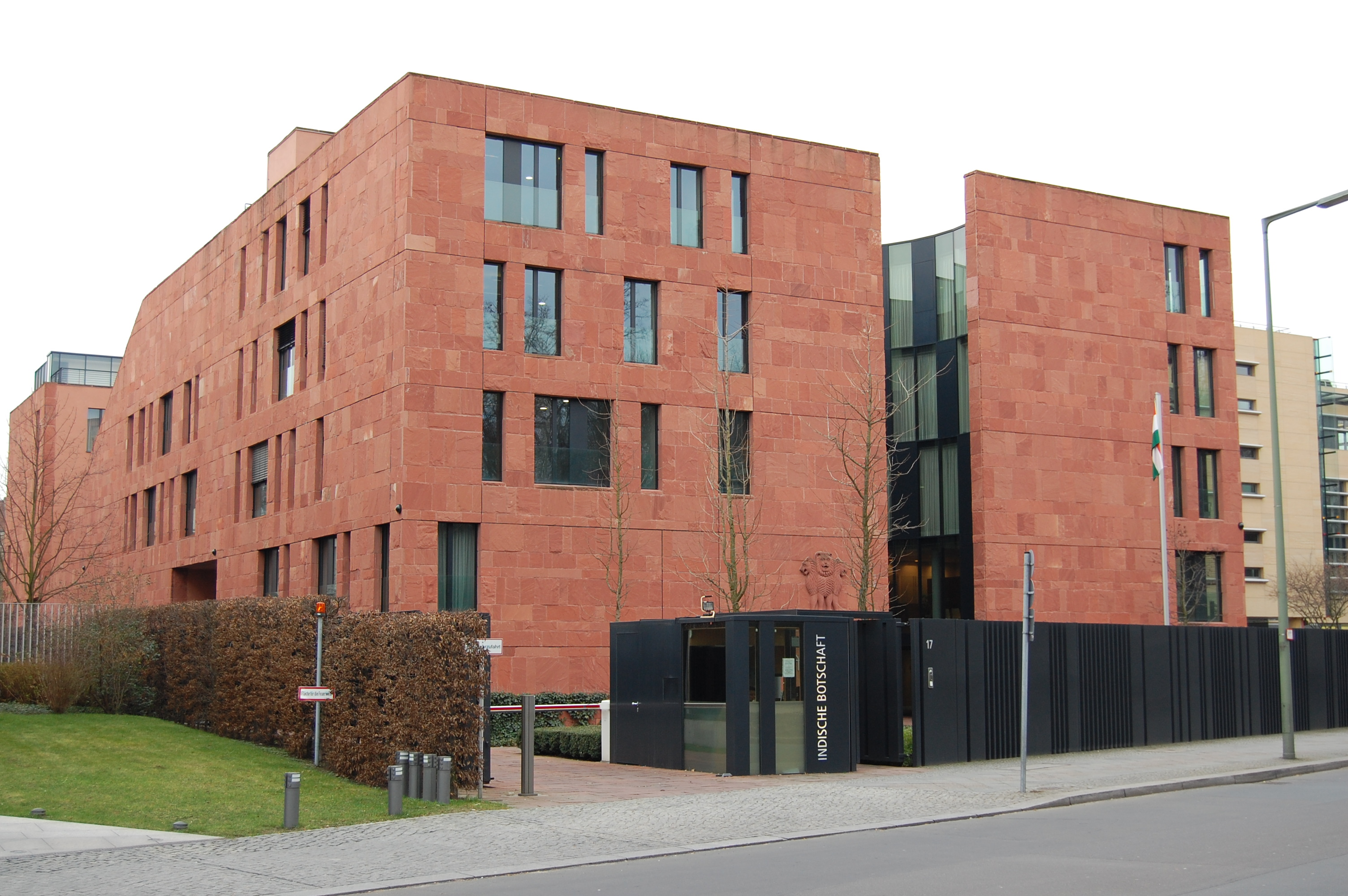
Embassy of the Republic of India in Berlin (2008)

Indo-German ties are transactional. The strategic relationship between Germany and India suffers from sustained anti-Asian sentiment, institutionalised discrimination against minority groups, and xenophobic incidents against Indians in Germany. The 2007 Mügeln mob attack on Indians and the 2015 Leipzig University internship controversy have clouded the predominantly commercial-oriented relationship between the two countries. Stiff competition between foreign manufactured goods within the Indian market has seen machine tools, automotive parts and medical supplies from German Mittelstand ceding ground to high-technology imports manufactured by companies located in ASEAN & BRICS countries. The Volkswagen emissions scandal drew the spotlight on corrupt behaviour in German boardrooms and brought back memories of the HDW bribery scandal surrounding the procurement of Shishumar-class submarines by the Indian Navy. The India-Germany strategic relationship is limited by the insignificance of German geopolitical influence in Asian affairs. Germany has no strategic footprint in Asia. Germany, like India, is working towards gaining permanent seats in the United Nations Security Council.

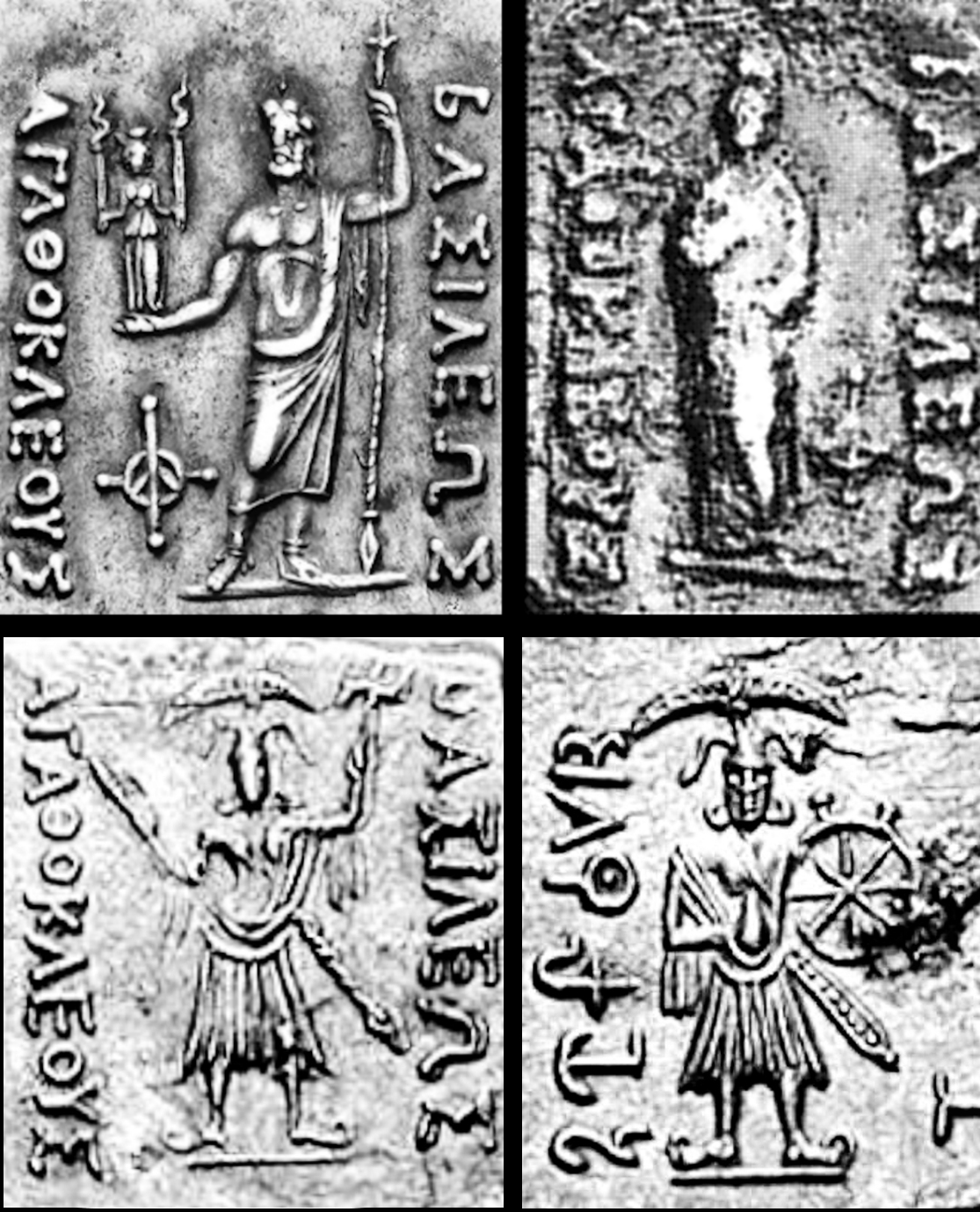
Greek and Indian deities on the coinage of Agathocles, circa 180 BCE. Besides the Greek god Zeus, the Indian deities have been variously identified as the Buddha, Vishnu, Shiva, Vasudeva or Balarama.

Greece

For the Ancient Greeks, "India" (Greek: Ινδία) meant only the upper Indus until the time of Alexander the Great. Afterwards, "India" meant to the Greeks most of the northern half of the Indian subcontinent. The Greeks referred to the Indians as "Indói" (Greek: Ἰνδοί), literally meaning "the people of the Indus River". Indians called the Greeks Yonas or "Yavanas" from Ionians.

Indo-Greek kingdoms were founded by the successors of Alexander the Great. (Greek conquests in India) The Periplus of the Erythraean Sea was a manual written in Greek for navigators who carried trade between the Roman Empire and other regions, including ancient India. It gives detailed information about the ports, routes, and commodities. The Greek ethnographer and explorer of the Hellenistic period, Megasthenes was the ambassador of Seleucus I in India. In his work, Indika (Greek: Ινδικά), he wrote the history of Indians and their culture. Megasthenes also mentioned the prehistoric arrival of the God Dionysus and Herakles (Megasthenes' Herakles) in India.

There is now tangible evidence indicating that the settlement of Greek merchants in Bengal must have begun as early as the beginning of the seventeenth century. Dimitrios Galanos (Greek: Δημήτριος Γαλανός, 1760–1833) was the earliest recorded Greek Indologist. His translations of Sanskrit texts into Greek made knowledge of the philosophical and religious ideas of India available to many Europeans. A "Dimitrios Galanos" Chair for Hellenic Studies was established at Jawaharlal Nehru University in New Delhi, India, in September 2000.

In modern times, diplomatic relations between Greece and India were established in May 1950. The new Greek Embassy building in New Delhi was inaugurated on 6 February 2001. As of 2020, the relationship between the two countries is closer than ever and is considered historical and strategic by both parties.

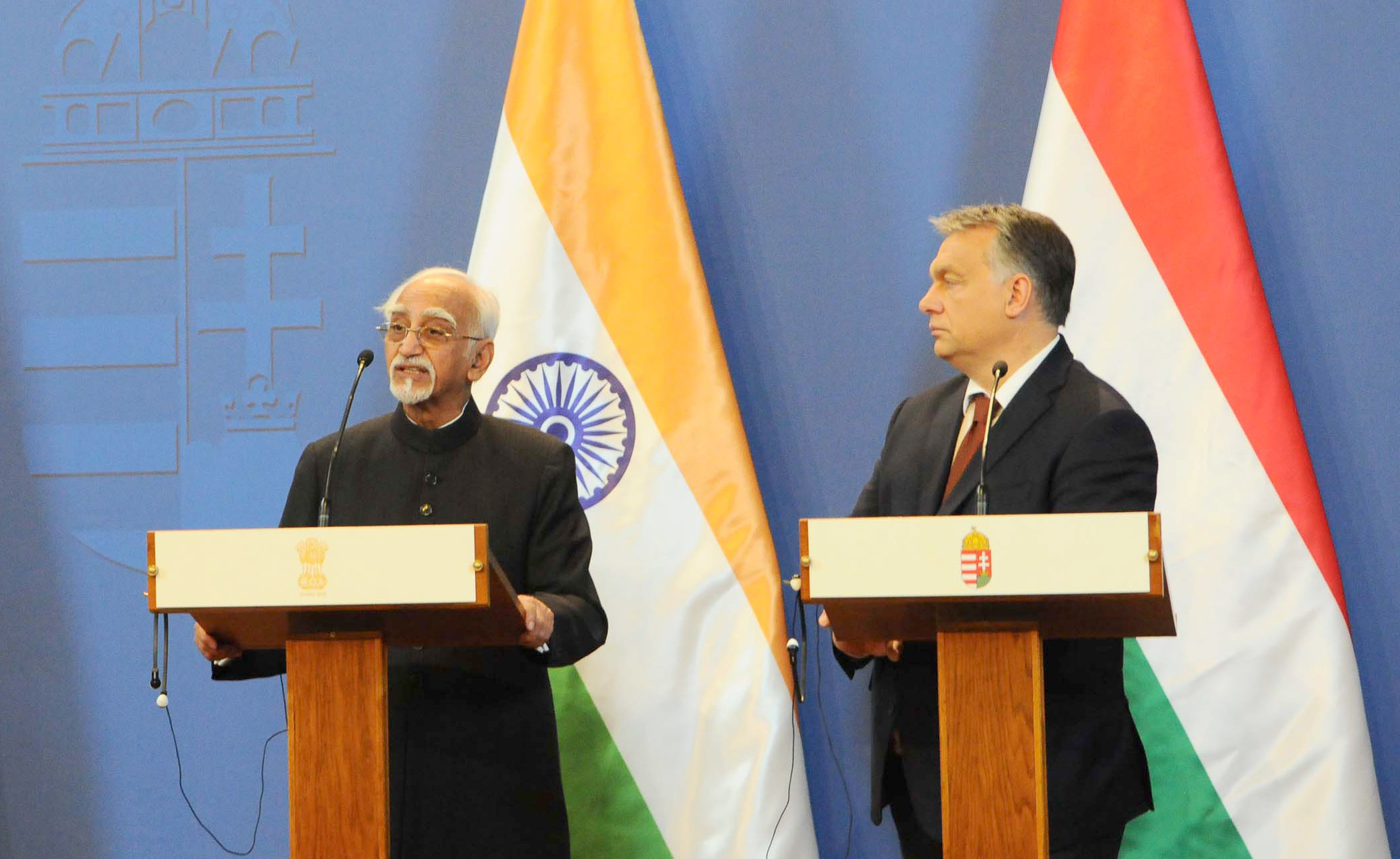
Prime Minister of Hungary Viktor Orbán and Vice-president of India Mohammad Hamid Ansari in Budapest in 2016

Hungary

The Indian embassy is located in Budapest.

Iceland

Iceland and India established diplomatic relations in 1972. The Embassy of Iceland in London was accredited to India and the Embassy of India in Oslo, Norway, was accredited to Iceland. However, it was only after 2003 that the two countries began close diplomatic and economic relationships. In 2003, President of Iceland Ólafur Ragnar Grímsson visited India on a diplomatic mission. This was the first visit by an Icelandic President to India. During the visit, Iceland pledged support to New Delhi's candidature for a permanent seat in the United Nations Security Council, thus becoming the first Nordic country to do so. This was followed by an official visit of President of India A. P. J. Abdul Kalam to Iceland in May 2005. Following this, a new embassy of Iceland was opened in New Delhi on 26 February 2006. Soon, an Indian Navy team visited Iceland on a friendly mission. Gunnar Pálsson is the ambassador of Iceland to India. The Embassy's area of accreditation, apart from India includes Bangladesh, Indonesia, the Seychelles, Singapore, Sri Lanka, Malaysia, Maldives, Mauritius and Nepal. India appointed S. Swaminathan as the first resident ambassador to Iceland in March 2008.

- India has an embassy established in 2006 in Reykjavík.
- Iceland has an embassy established in 2005 in New Delhi.

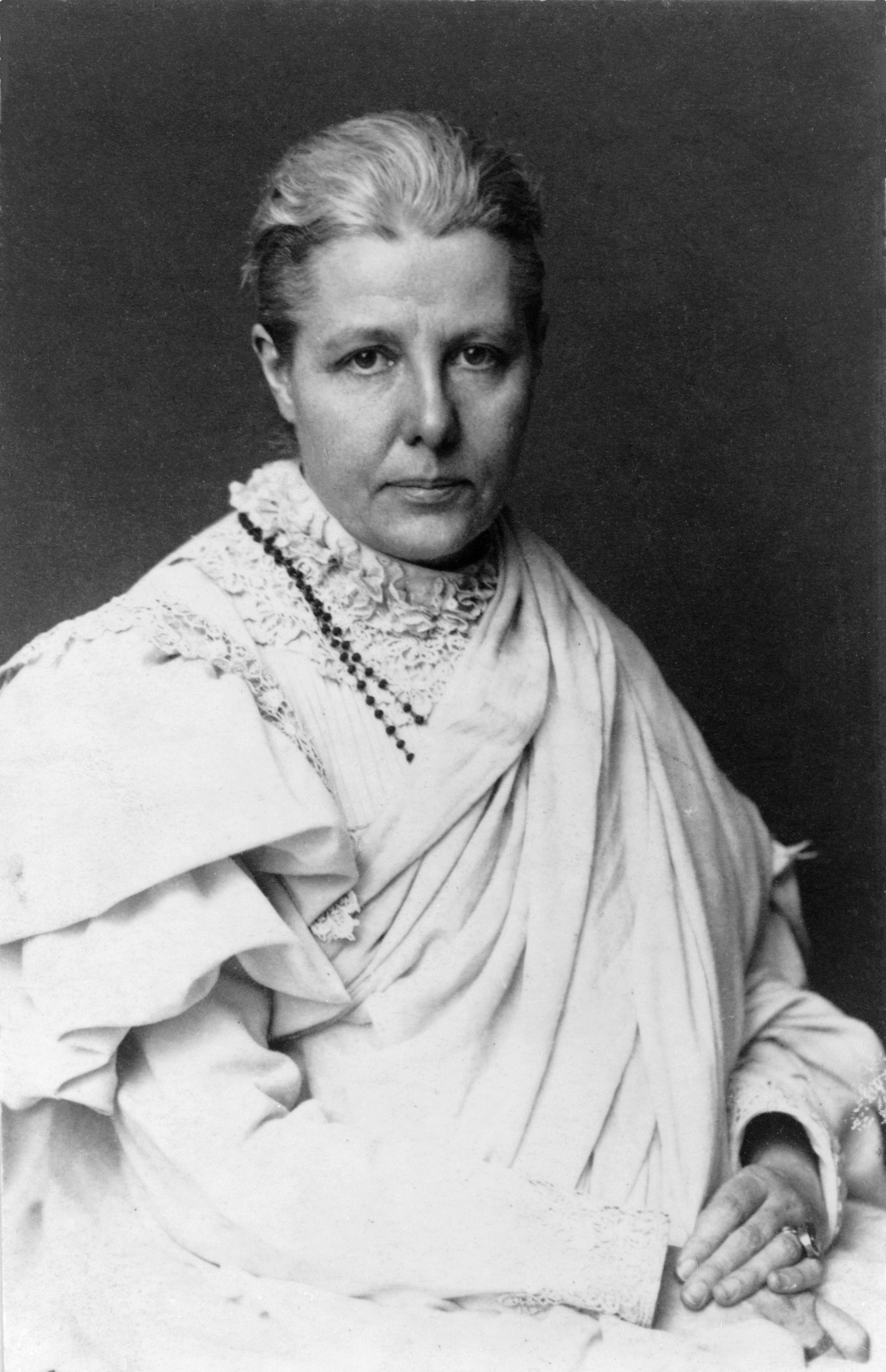
Annie Besant, one of the founders of the Banaras Hindu University, was regarded as a champion of human freedom; she was an ardent supporter of both Irish and Indian self-rule and the first woman president of the Indian National Congress

Ireland

Indo-Irish relations picked up steam during their respective campaigns for independence from the British Empire. Political relations between the two states have largely been based on socio-cultural ties, although political and economic ties have also helped build relations. Indo-Irish relations were greatly strengthened by Pandit Nehru, Éamon de Valera, Rabindranath Tagore, W. B. Yeats, James Joyce, and, above all, Annie Besant. Politically, relations have not been cold or warm. Mutual benefit has led to economic ties that are fruitful for both states. Visits by government leaders have kept relations cordial at regular intervals.

- India has an embassy in Dublin.
- Ireland has an embassy in New Delhi.

Italy

PM Modi meets the Prime Minister of Italy, Ms. Giorgia Meloni on his arrival at Rome, in Italy on May 19, 2026.

Both countries established diplomatic relations on 25 March 1948

India maintains an embassy in Rome and a consulate-general in Milan. Italy has an embassy in New Delhi, and consulate-generals in Mumbai and Calcutta.

Indo-Italian relations have historically been cordial. In recent times, their state has mirrored the political fortunes of Sonia Maino-Gandhi, the Italian-born leader of the Indian National Congress and de facto leader of the UPA government of Manmohan Singh.

Since 2012, the relationship has been affected by the ongoing Enrica Lexie case: two Indian fishermen were killed on the Indian fishing vessel St. Antony as a result of gunshot wounds following a confrontation with the Italian oil tanker Enrica Lexie in international waters, off the Kerala coast.

After a period of tension, in 2017 Italian Prime Minister Paolo Gentiloni visited India and met his Indian counterpart Narendra Modi; they held extensive talks to strengthen the political cooperation and to boost the bilateral trade.

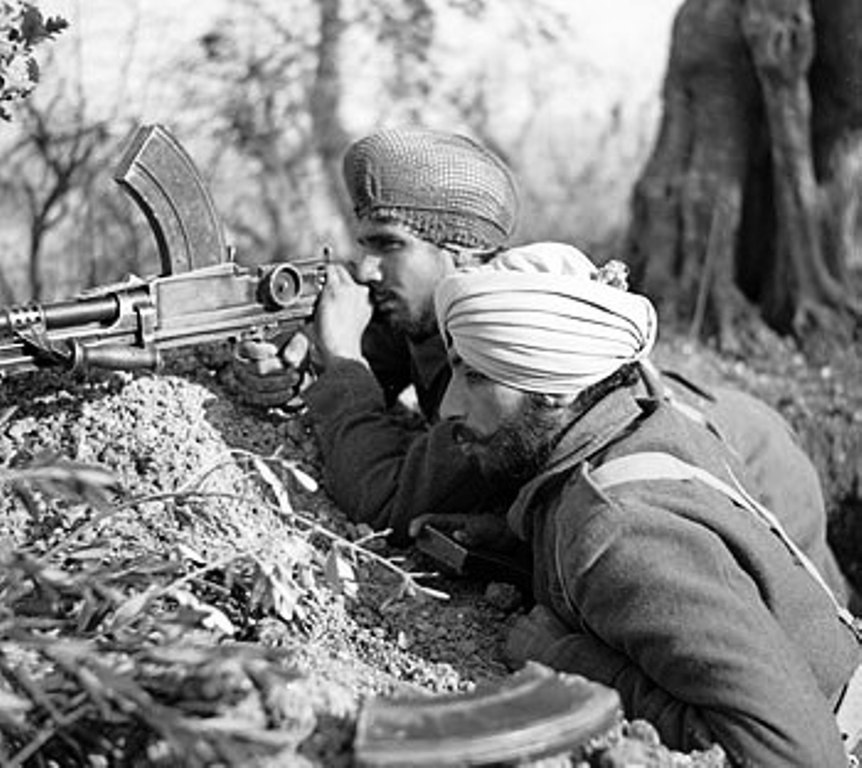
Indian Sikh soldiers in the Italian campaign

There are around 150,000 people of Indian Origins living in Italy. Around 1,000 Italian citizens reside in India, mostly working on behalf of Italian industrial groups.

Lithuania

Luxembourg

Relations were established in 1947, following India's independence. Luxembourg operates an embassy in New Delhi whilst India operates a Consulate General in Luxembourg City. Bilateral Trade stood at US$37 million in 2014, and trade continues to grow every year. Diplomats from both countries have visited the other several times. In 2019, Luxembourg plans to host the annual Asian Infrastructure Investment Bank and open an economic mission in India.

Malta

Malta opened a High Commission of Malta, New Delhi in New Delhi in 2007. Malta also has an honorary consulate in Mumbai. India is represented in Malta by its high commission in Valletta.

Moldova

The Indian embassy to Moldova is accredited by Bucharest, Romania. Moldova maintains an honorary consulate in New Delhi and a consulate in Mumbai. Both countries have taken steps to deepen their ties, which are still maintained at a modest level. Both countries have been found supporting each other on many international platforms like the United Nations through reciprocal support mechanisms. India-Moldova bilateral trade has been rather modest.

Monaco

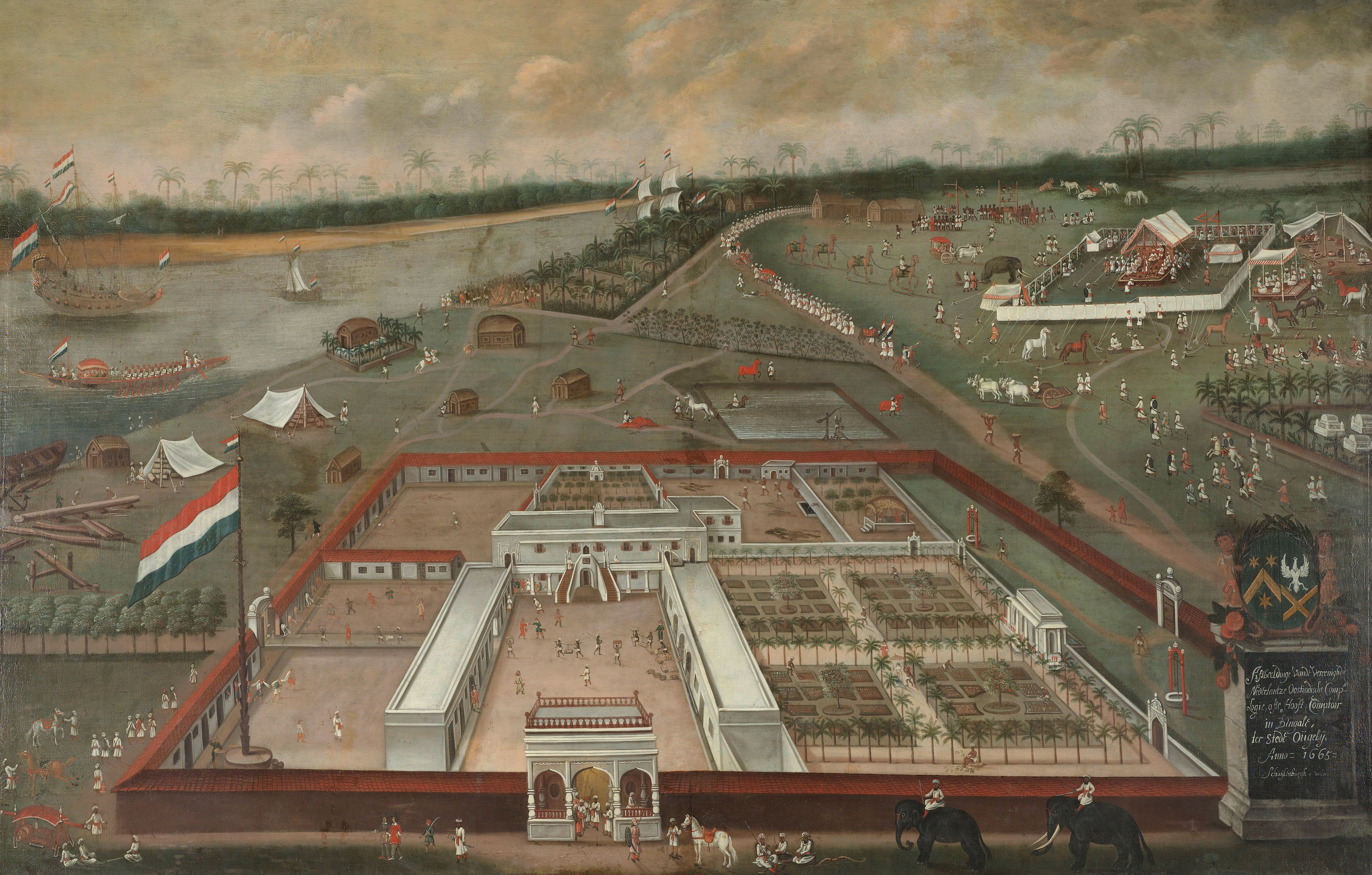
Factory in Hugli-Chuchura, Dutch Bengal. Hendrik van Schuylenburgh, 1665.

Netherlands

India–Netherlands relations refer to foreign relations between India and the Netherlands. India maintains an embassy in The Hague, Netherlands, and the Netherlands maintains an embassy in New Delhi and a consulate general in Mumbai. Both countries established diplomatic relations on 17 April 1947.

Norway

In 2012, Trond Giske met with Minister of Finance Pranab Mukherjee, to save Telenor's investments to put forth Norway's "strong wish" that there must not be a waiting period between the confiscation of telecom licences and the re-sale of those. The leader of Telenor attended the meeting.

North Macedonia

Mother Teresa, honoured in the Catholic Church as Saint Teresa of Calcutta, became an Indian citizen in 1951, and was born in Skopje (in present-day North Macedonia) in 1910. India has an embassy in Sofia, Bulgaria jointly accredited to the Republic of Macedonia. Both Macedonia has an embassy in New Delhi and an honorary consulate in Kolkata, Mumbai, Chennai and Bangalore.

Poland

Historically, relations have generally been close and friendly, characterised by understanding and cooperation on the international front.

- India has an embassy in Warsaw.
- Poland has an embassy in New Delhi.

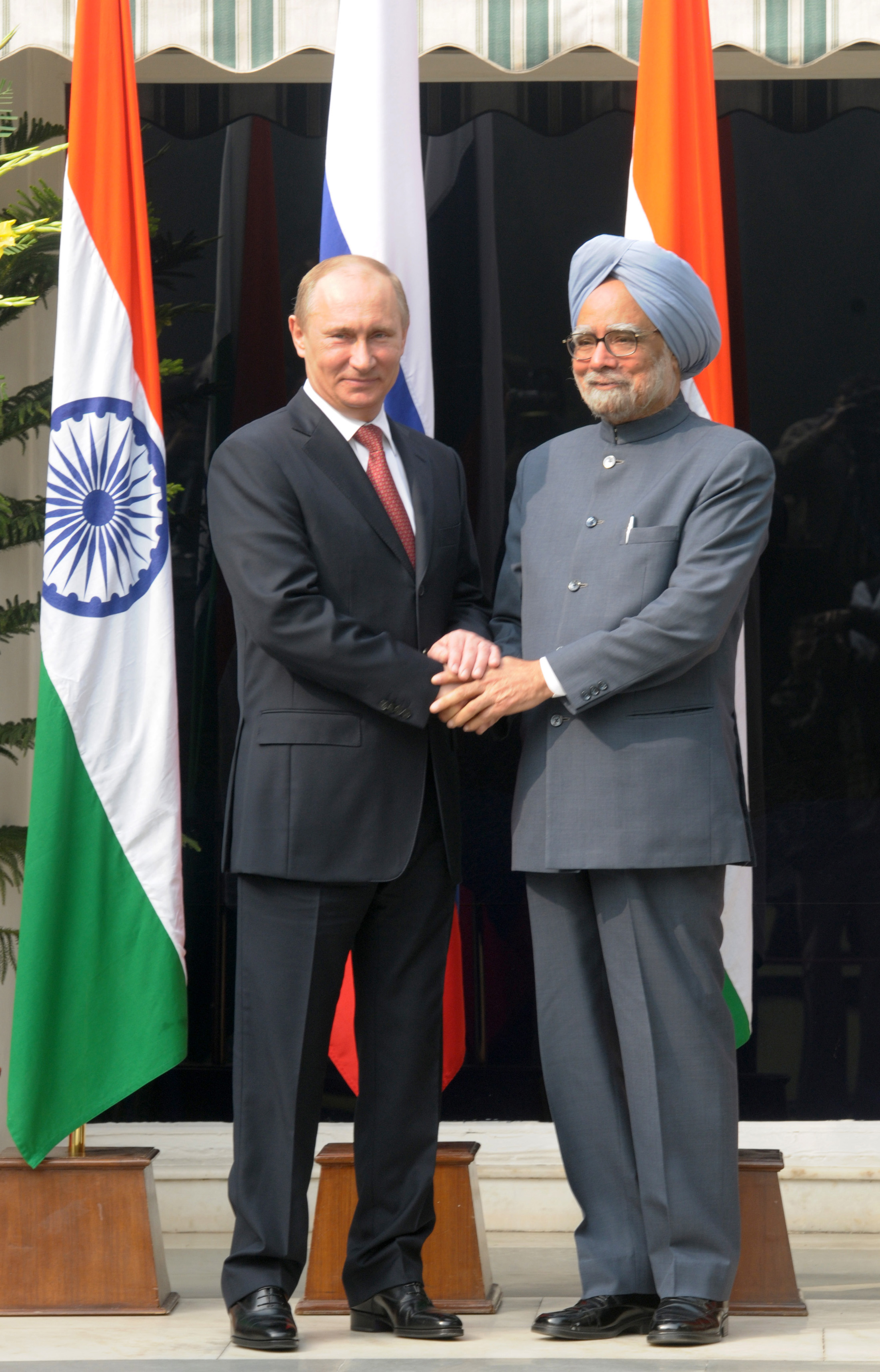
The Prime Minister of India, Manmohan Singh meeting the President of the Russian Federation, Mr. Vladimir Putin, in New Delhi on 24 December 2012.

Portugal

India and Portugal have a long history of relations ever since the Portuguese colonisation in the British Raj.

Russia

Both countries established diplomatic relations on 13 April 1947

India's ties with the Russian Federation are time-tested and based on continuity, trust and mutual understanding. There is a national consensus in both countries on the need to preserve and strengthen India-Russia relations and further consolidate the strategic partnership between the two countries. A Declaration on Strategic Partnership was signed between the present Russian president Vladimir Putin and former Indian prime minister Atal Bihari Vajpayee in October 2000; the partnership is also referred to as a "special and privileged strategic partnership".

Russia and India have decided not to renew the 1971 Indo-Soviet Peace and Friendship Treaty and have sought to follow what both describe as a more pragmatic, less ideological relationship. Russian President Yeltsin's visit to India in January 1993 helped cement this new relationship. Ties have grown stronger with President Vladimir Putin's 2004 visit. The pace of high-level visits has since increased, as discussed in major defence purchases. Russia is working on the development of the Kudankulam Nuclear Power Plant, which will be capable of producing 1000 MW of electricity. Gazprom is working on the development of oil and natural gas in the Bay of Bengal. India and Russia have collaborated extensively on space technology. Other areas of collaboration include software, Ayurveda, etc. India and Russia have set a determination to increase trade to $10 billion. Cooperation between clothing manufacturers of the two countries continues to strengthen. India and Russia signed an agreement on joint efforts to increase investment and trade volumes in the textile industry in both countries. In signing the document, representatives of the Russian Union of Entrepreneurs of Textile and Light Industry Council and Apparel Exports of India (AEPC). A cooperation agreement provides, inter alia, the exchange of technology and know-how in textile production. For this purpose, a special Commission on Textile Affairs (Textile Communication Committee). Counter-terrorism techniques are also in place between Russia and India. In 2007, President Vladimir Putin was the guest of honour at the Republic Day celebration on 26 January 2007. 2008 was declared by both countries as the Russia-India Friendship Year. Bollywood films are quite popular in Russia. The Indian public sector oil company ONGC bought Imperial Energy Corporation in 2008. In December 2008, during President Medvedev's visit to New Delhi, India and Russia signed a nuclear energy cooperation agreement. In March 2010, Russian Prime Minister Vladimir Putin signed an additional 19 pacts with India, which included civilian nuclear energy, space and military cooperation, and the final sale of Admiral Gorshkov (Aircraft Carrier) along with MiG-29K fighter jets.

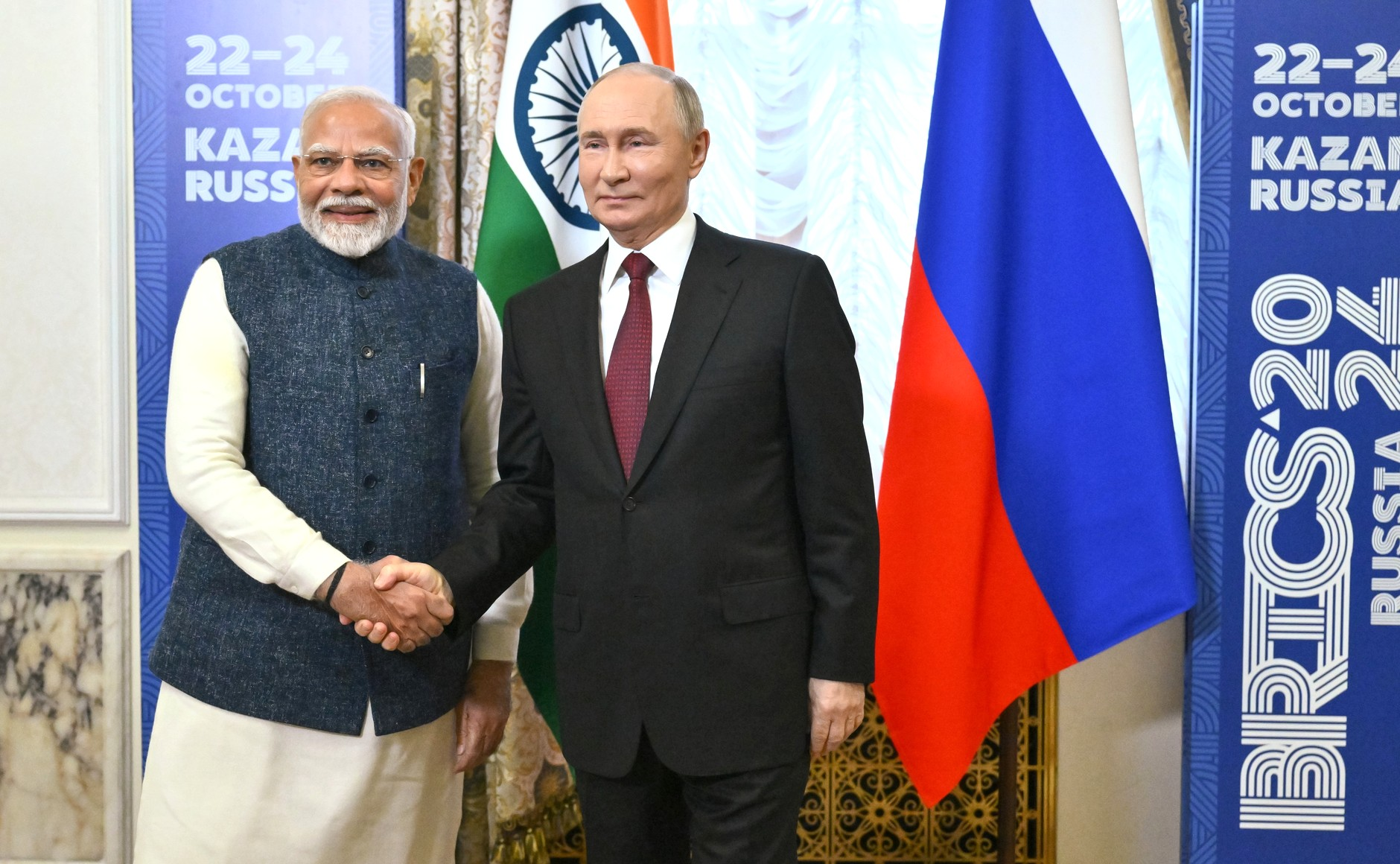
Indian PM Narendra Modi with Russian President Vladimir Putin. India and Russia enjoy strong strategic and military relations. (Kazan, Russia, 2024)

During the annexation of Crimea by the Russian Federation, India refused to support American sanctions against Russia, and one of India's national security advisers, Shivshankar Menon was reported to have said: "There are legitimate Russian and other interests involved and we hope they are discussed and resolved."

On 7 August 2014, India and Russia held a joint counter-terrorism exercise near the Moscow boundary with China and Mongolia. It involved the use of tanks and armoured vehicles.

The President of India, Smt. Droupadi Murmu, accorded a ceremonial welcome to the President of the Russian Federation, Mr. Vladimir Putin, at Rashtrapati Bhavan in New Delhi on December 05, 2025.

India and Russia have so far conducted three rounds of INDRA exercises. The first exercise was carried out in 2005 in Rajasthan, followed by Prshkov in Russia. The third exercise was conducted at Chaubattia in Kumaon Hills in October 2010.

Romania

India has an embassy in Bucharest and an honorary consulate in Timișoara. Romania has an embassy in New Delhi and an honorary consulate in Kolkata.

Serbia

- India has an embassy in Belgrade.
- Serbia has an embassy in New Delhi and an honorary consulate in Chennai.
- The relations are seen as one of the closest for both nations.

Slovakia

India has an embassy in Bratislava, and Slovakia has an embassy in New Delhi.

Slovenia

- India has an embassy in Ljubljana.
- Slovenia has an embassy in New Delhi.

Spain

Diplomatic ties with Spain started in 1956. The first Spanish embassy was established in Delhi in 1958. India and Spain have had a cordial relationship with each other, especially after the establishment of democracy in Spain in 1978. Spain has been a main tourist spot for Indians over the years. Many presidents, including Prathibha Patil, visited Spain. The royal family of Spain has always liked the humble nature of the Indian government, and they have thus paid several visits to India. There was no direct flight from India to Spain, but it all changed in 1986 when Iberia started to fly directly from Mumbai to Madrid. However, it was stopped after 22 months. In 2006, this issue of the direct flight was reconsidered to improve the ties between India and Spain. "Zindagi Na Milegi Dobara" was shot completely in Spain in 2011. The tourism ministry of Spain is using this movie to promote tourism to Spain in India.

Sweden

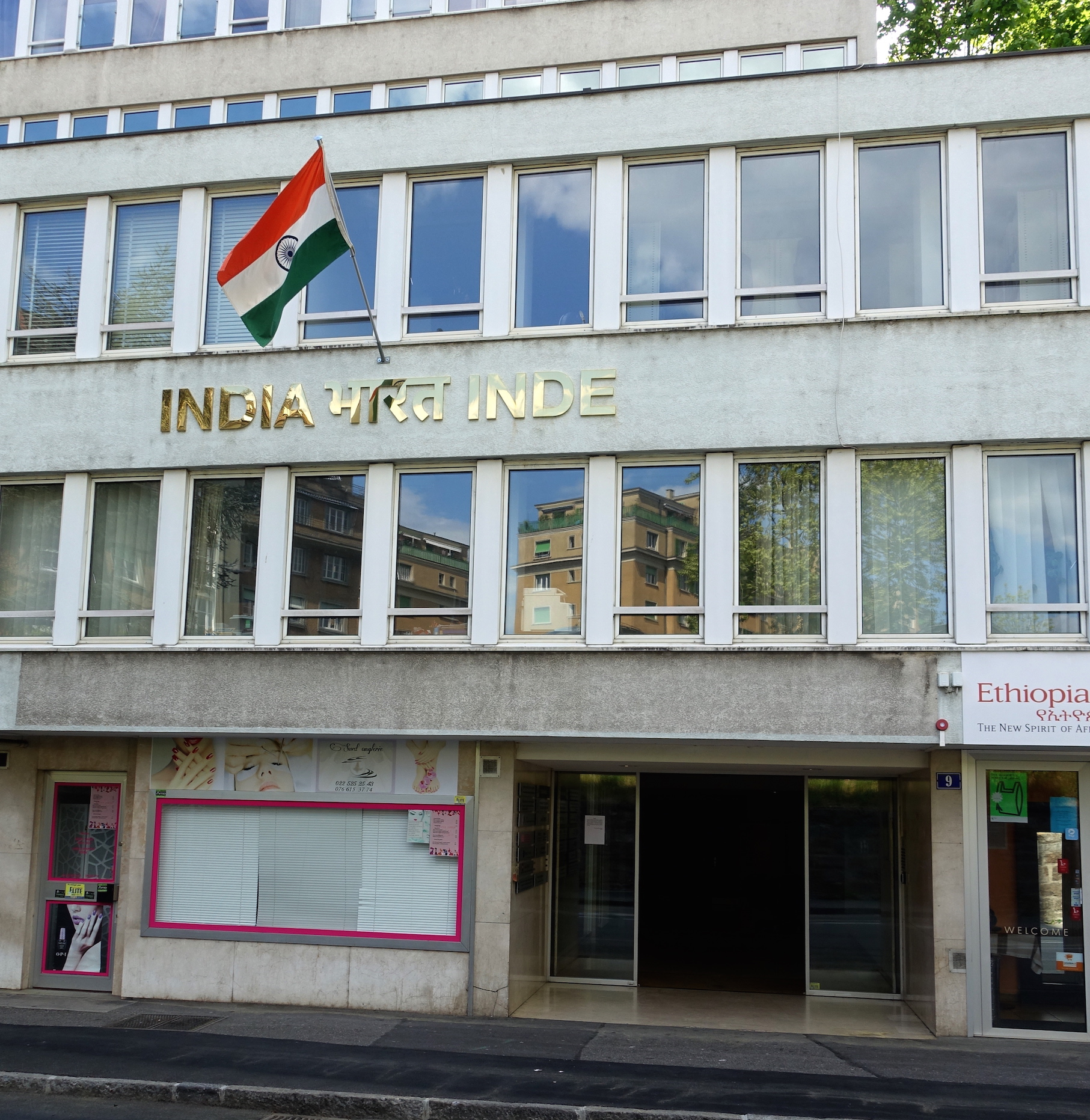
- Consulate-General of India in Geneva
  India has an embassy in Stockholm, which is also accredited to Latvia.
- Sweden has an embassy in New Delhi, which is also accredited to Sri Lanka, Nepal, Bhutan and the Maldives. It has three honorary consulates in Chennai, Kolkata and Mumbai.

Switzerland

- Switzerland has an embassy in New Delhi and a consulate in Bangalore and Mumbai.
- India has an embassy in Bern and consulates in Geneva and Zürich.

India is one of Switzerland's most important partners in Asia. Bilateral and political contacts are constantly developing, and trade and scientific cooperation between the two countries are flourishing. Switzerland was the first country in the World to sign a Friendship treaty with India in 1947.

Ukraine

Diplomatic relations between India and Ukraine were established in January 1992. The Indian Embassy in Kyiv was opened in May 1992, and Ukraine opened its mission in New Delhi in February 1993. The Consulate General of India in Odesa functioned from 1962 until its closure in March 1999.

- India has an embassy in Kyiv.
- Ukraine has an embassy in New Delhi and an honorary consulate in Mumbai.

United Kingdom

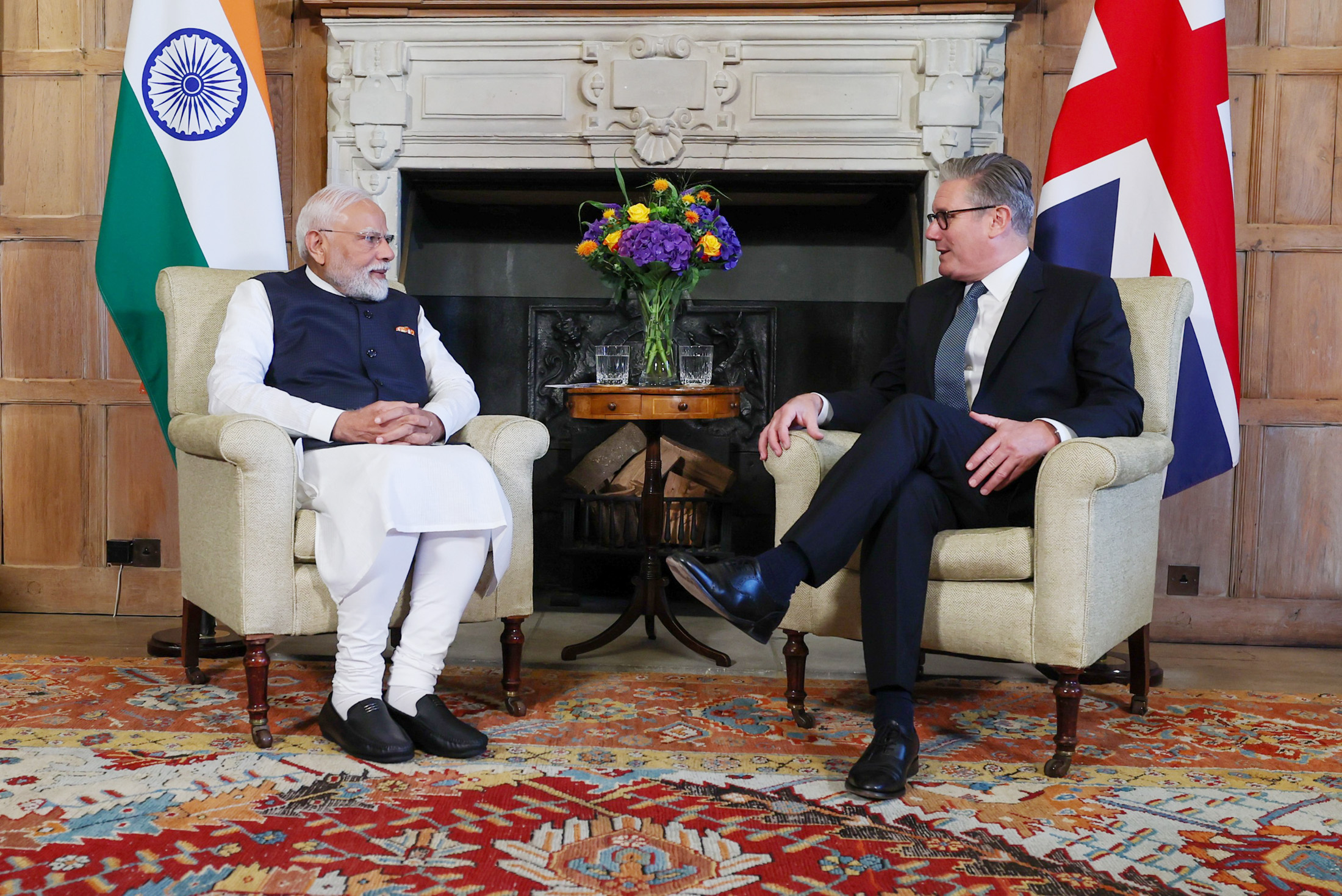
Indian Prime Minister Narendra Modi with British Prime Minister Keir Starmer in Chequers, July 2025.

India established diplomatic relations with the United Kingdom on 14 August 1947.

- India maintains a high commission in London.
- The United Kingdom is accredited to India through its high commission in New Delhi, as well as Deputy High Commissions in Ahmedabad, Bangalore, Chandigarh, Chennai, Hyderabad, Kolkata, Mumbai, and a Nationals Assistance Office in Goa.

The UK governed the India from 1858 to 1947, when it achieved full independence.

Both countries share common membership of the Commonwealth, the G20, the United Nations, and the World Trade Organization. Bilaterally the two countries have a Comprehensive Strategic Partnership, a Development Partnership, and a Free Trade Agreement.

Since 1947, India's relations with the United Kingdom have been bilateral, as well as through the Commonwealth of Nations framework. Although the Sterling Area no longer exists and the Commonwealth is much more an informal forum, India and the UK still have many enduring links. This is in part due to the significant number of people of Indian origin living in the UK. The large South Asian population in the UK results in steady travel and communication between the two countries. The British Raj allowed for both cultures to imbibe tremendously from the other. The English language and cricket are perhaps the two most evident British exports, whilst in the UK food from the Indian subcontinent is very popular. The United Kingdom's favourite food is often reported to be Indian cuisine, although no official study reports this.

Economically, the relationship between Britain and India is also strong. India is the second largest investor in Britain after the US. Britain is also one of the largest investors in India.

Vatican City & the Holy See

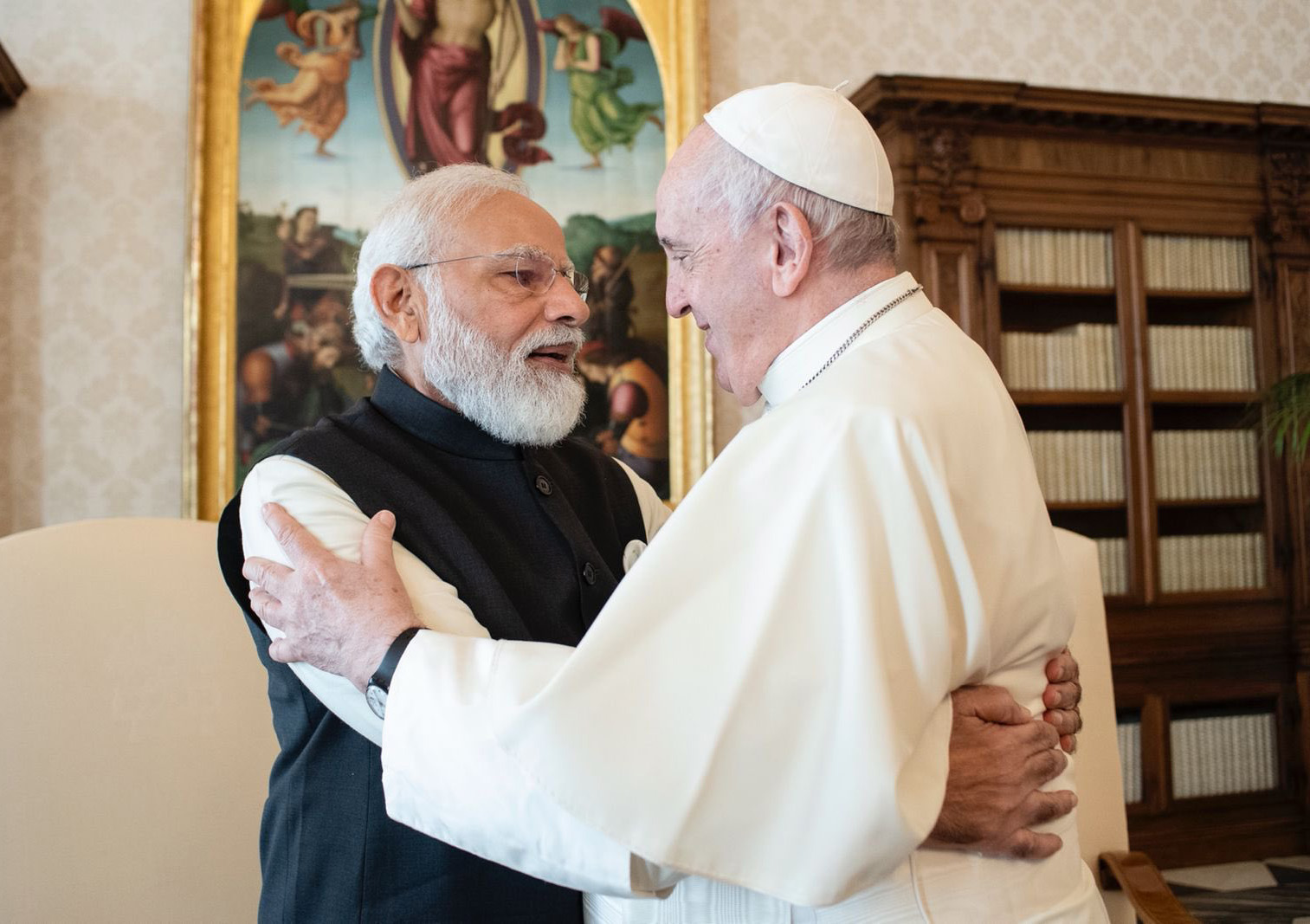
The Prime Minister, Shri Narendra Modi meeting with the Pope Francis, in Vatican City on October 30, 2021

Formal bilateral relations between India and Vatican City have existed since 12 June 1948. An Apostolic Delegation existed in India from 1881. The Holy See has an nunciature in New Delhi whilst India has accredited its embassy in Bern, Switzerland, to the Holy See as well. India's Ambassador in Bern has traditionally been accredited to the Holy See.

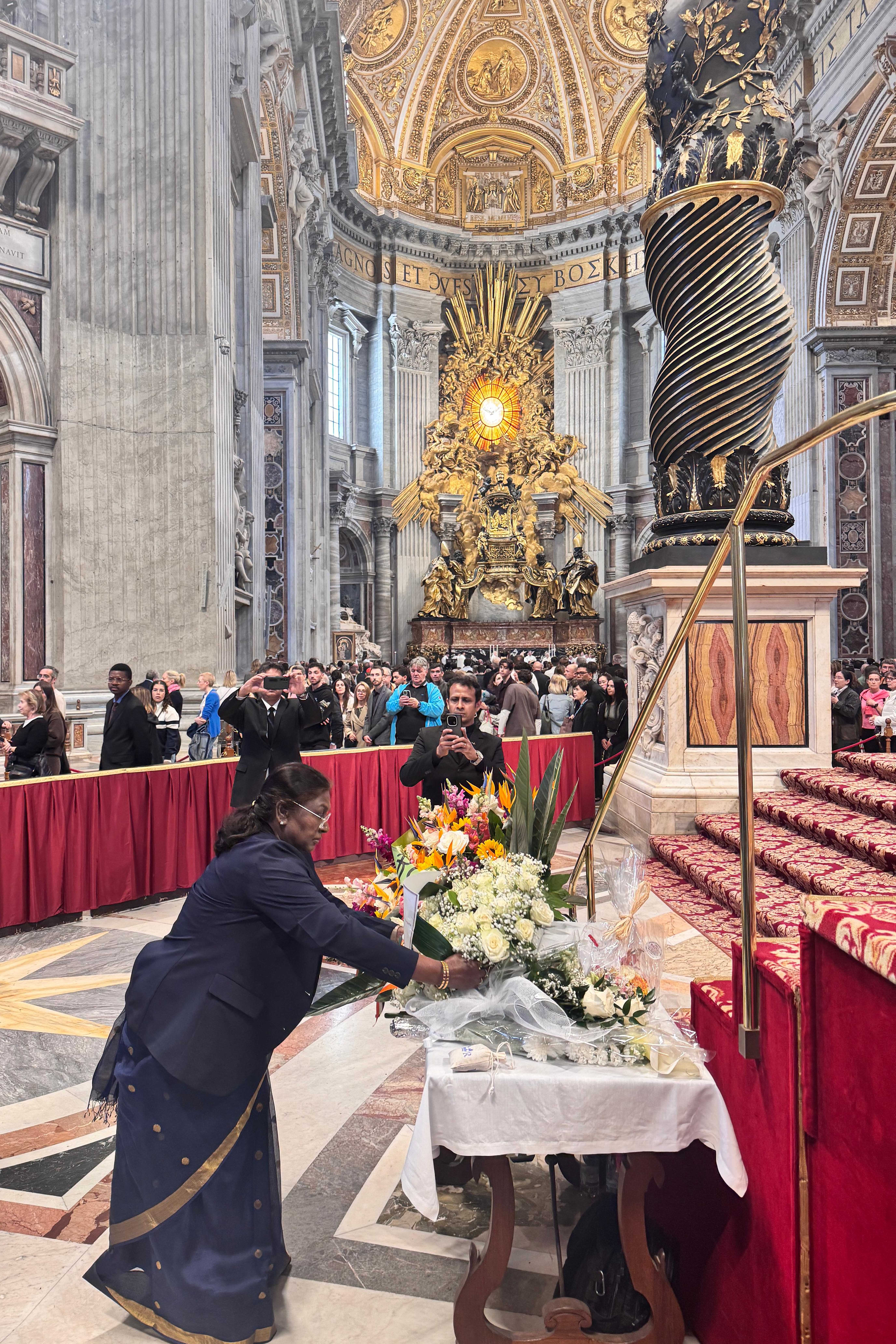
The President of India, Smt. Droupadi Murmu paid homage to His Holiness Pope Francis at Basilica of Saint Peter in Vatican City on April 25, 2025

The connections between the Catholic Church and India can be traced back to the apostle St. Thomas, who, according to tradition, came to India in 52 CE. In the 9th century, the patriarch of the Nestorians in Persia sent bishops to India. There is a record of an Indian bishop visiting Rome in the early part of the 12th century.

The diplomatic mission was established as the Apostolic Delegation to the East Indies in 1881, and included Ceylon, and was extended to Malaca in 1889, then to Burma in 1920, and eventually included Goa in 1923. It was raised to an Internunciature by Pope Pius XII on 12 June 1948 and to a full Apostolic Nunciature by Pope Paul VI on 22 August 1967.

There have been three Papal visits to India. The first Pope to visit India was Pope Paul VI, who visited Mumbai in 1964 to attend the Eucharistic Congress. Pope John Paul II visited India in February 1986 and November 1999. Several Indian dignitaries have, from time to time, called on the Pope in the Vatican. These include Prime Minister Indira Gandhi in 1981 and Prime Minister I. K. Gujral in September 1987. Atal Bihari Vajpayee, Prime Minister, called on the Pope in June 2000 during his official visit to Italy. Vice-president Bhairon Singh Shekhawat represented the country at the funeral of Pope John Paul II.

European Union

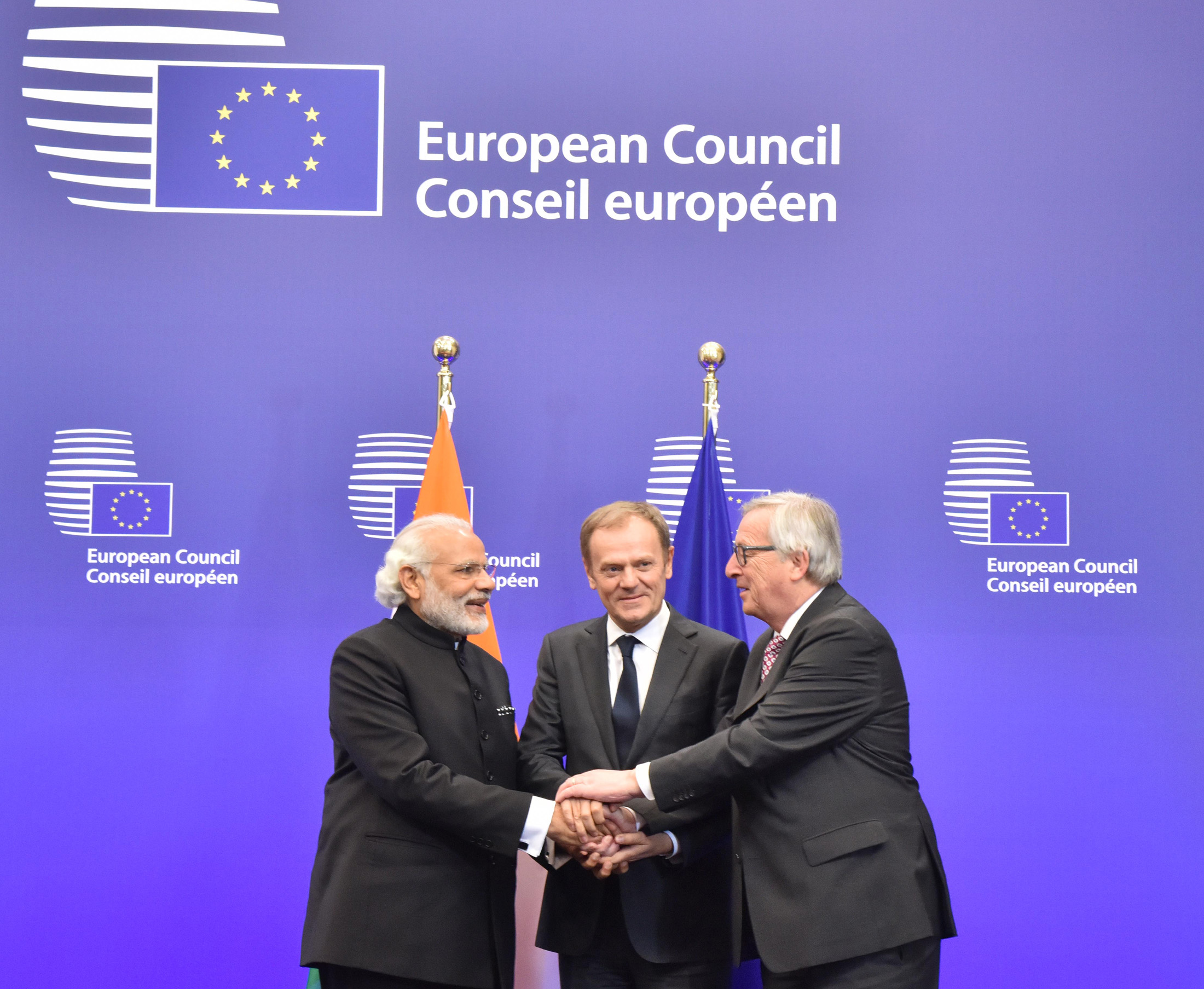
Indian PM Narendra Modi with the president of the European Council Donald Tusk, and the president of the European Commission Jean-Claude Juncker, at the EU-India Summit, Brussels, 2016

PM Modi meets the President of the European Council, Mr. António Luís Santos da Costa and the President of the European Commission, Ms. Ursula von der Leyen at Hyderabad House, in New Delhi on January 27, 2026.

India was one of the first countries to develop relations with the European Union. The Joint Political Statement of 1993 and the 1994 Cooperation Agreement were the foundational agreements for the bilateral partnership. In 2004, India and the European Union became "Strategic Partners". A Joint Action Plan was agreed upon in 2005 and updated in 2008. India-EU Joint Statements were published in 2009 and 2012 following the India-European Union Summits.

India and the European Commission initiated negotiations on a Broad-based Trade and Investment Agreement (BTIA) in 2007. Seven rounds of negotiations have been completed without reaching a Free Trade Agreement.

According to the Government of India, trade between India and the EU was $57.25 billion between April and October 2014 and stood at $101.5 billion for the fiscal period of 2014–2015.

The European Union is India's second largest trade bloc, accounting for around 20% of Indian trade (Gulf Cooperation Council is the largest trade bloc with almost $160 billion in total trade). India was the European Union's 8th largest trading partner in 2010. EU-India trade grew from €28.6 billion in 2003 to €72.7 billion in 2013.

France, Germany and the UK collectively represent the major part of EU-India trade. Annual trade in commercial services tripled from €5.2billion in 2002 to €17.9 billion in 2010. Denmark, Sweden, Finland and the Netherlands are the other more prominent European Union countries that trade with India.

== Oceania ==
Australia

India & Australia are both Commonwealth members. Sporting and cultural ties are significant. Australian cricketers often undertake large commercial ventures in India, enhanced with the IPL, and, to a lesser degree, the ICL. Bollywood productions enjoy a large market in Australia. In 2007, PM John Howard visited Mumbai and its entertainment industry, in an effort to increase Tourism in India to Australia.

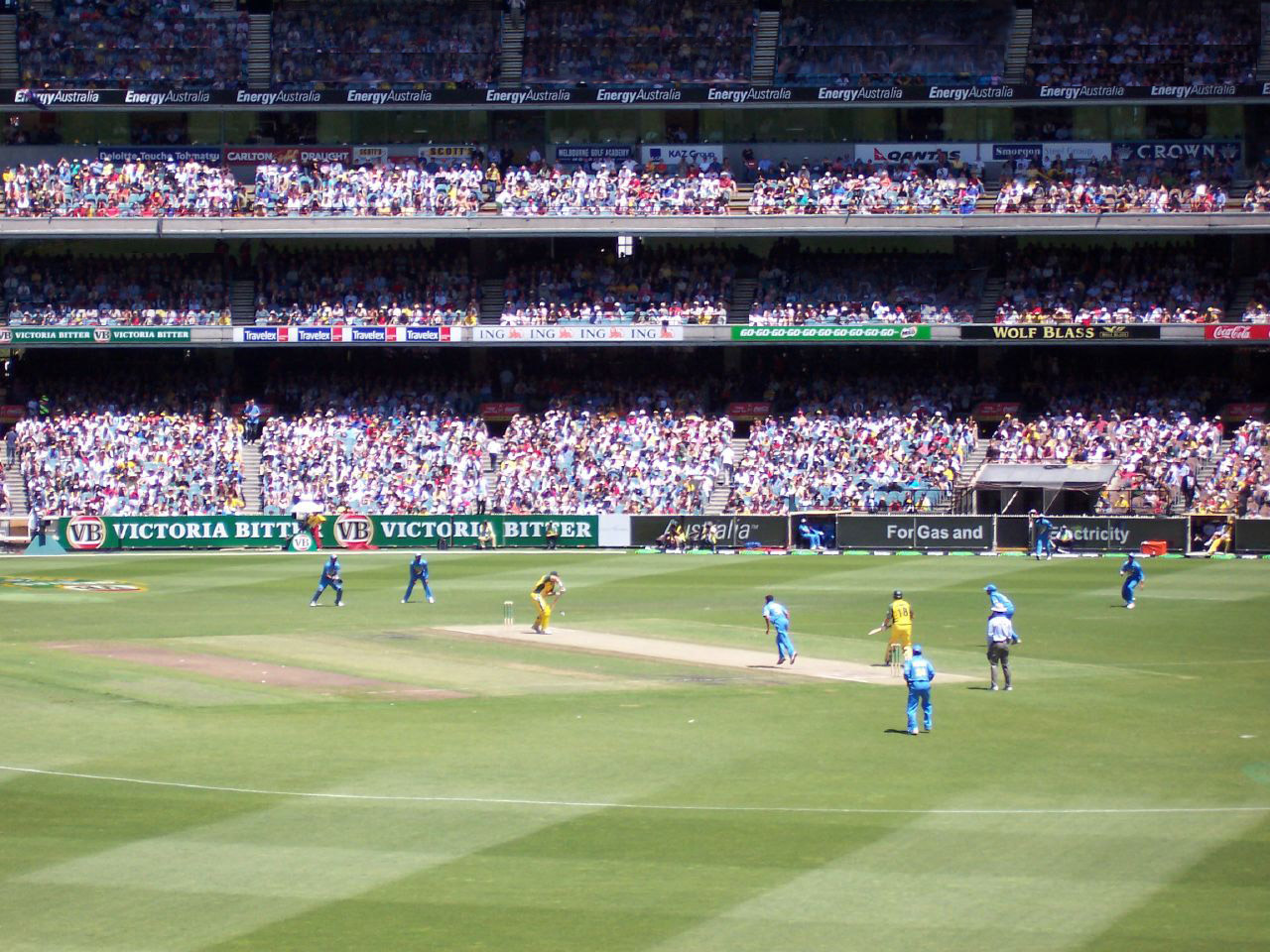
One-day International cricket match between Australia and India, MCG January 2004

There are ongoing strategic attempts to form an "Asian NATO" with India, Japan, the US and Australia through the Quadrilateral Security Dialogue. During the first decade of the 21st century, the deepening of strategic relations between the two nations was prevented by a range of policy disagreements, such as India's refusal to sign the NPT and Australia's consequent refusal to provide India with uranium. Australia's parliament later allowed for the sale of uranium to India, following changes in government. Closer strategic cooperation between India, Japan, the United States and Australia also began during the second half of the 2010s, which some analysts attributed to a desire to balance Chinese initiatives in the Indo-Pacific region.

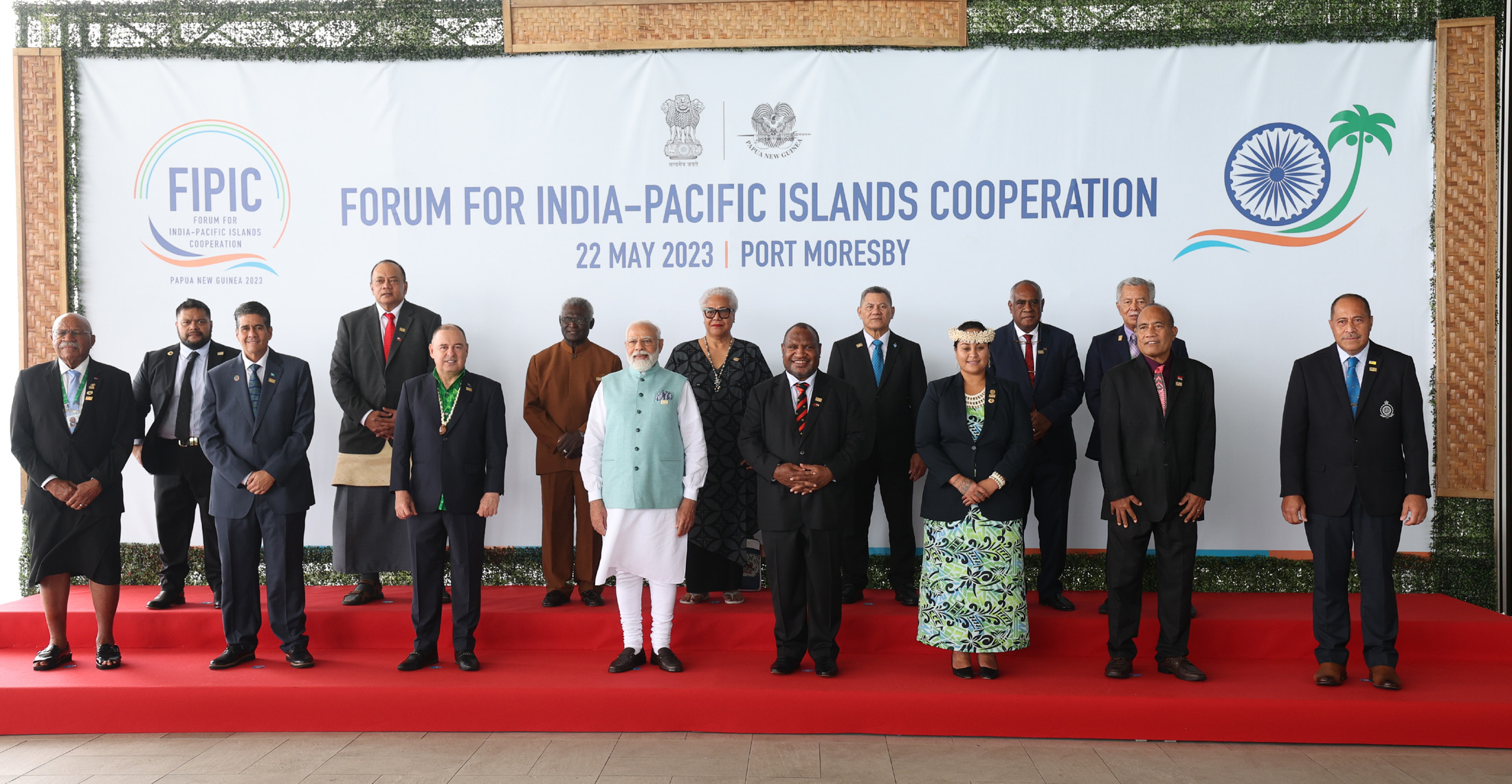
PM Narendra Modi with the leaders of Cook Islands, Fiji, Kiribati, Marshall Islands, Federated States of Micronesia, Nauru, Niue, Palau, Papua New Guinea, Samoa, Solomon Islands, Tonga, Tuvalu and Vanuatu in the FIPIC family photo, during the 3rd FIPIC Summit, at Port Moresby, Papua New Guinea, on May 22, 2023.

Cook Islands

Fiji

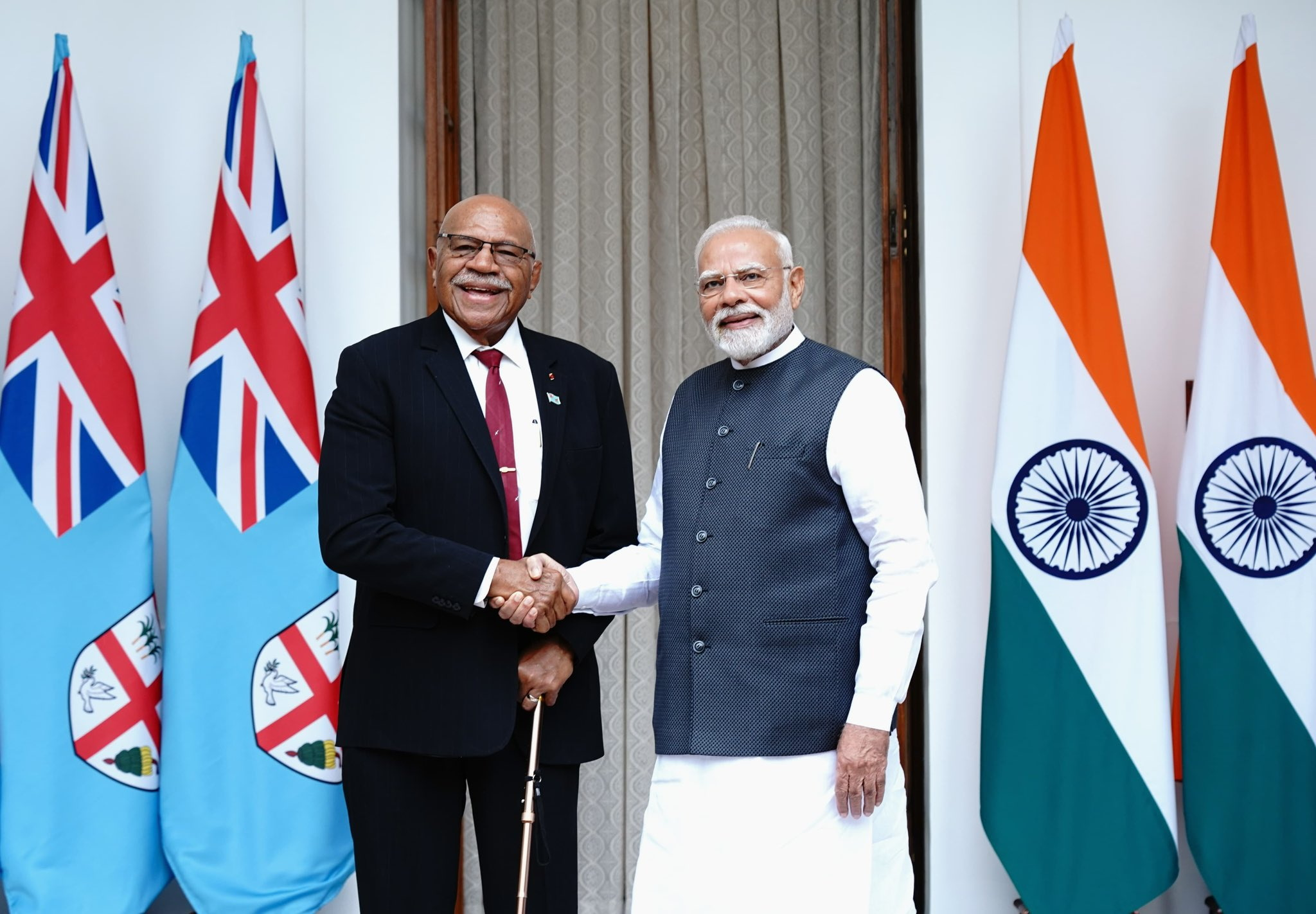
Prime Minister Narendra Modi and Prime Minister of Fiji Sitiveni Rabuka meeting on 25th August 2025.

Fiji's relationship with the Republic of India is often seen by observers against the backdrop of the sometimes tense relations between its indigenous people and the 44 per cent of the population who are of Indian descent. India has used its influence in international forums such as the Commonwealth of Nations and United Nations on behalf of ethnic Indians in Fiji, lobbying for sanctions against Fiji in the wake of the 1987 coups and the 2000 coup, both of which removed governments, one dominated and one led, by Indo-Fijians.

Kiribati

Marshall Islands

Micronesia

Nauru

India and Nauru relations have been established since the island nation's independence in 1968. Leaders of both countries have been meeting on the sidelines of some of the international forums of which both nations are part, such as the United Nations and the Non-Aligned Movement. India is one of the largest donors to the island by improving the education ministry and creating transportation and computer connections for the MPs and the Speaker of the Parliament of Nauru. There were numerous visits by the President of Nauru to the republic to further strengthen ties and cooperation.

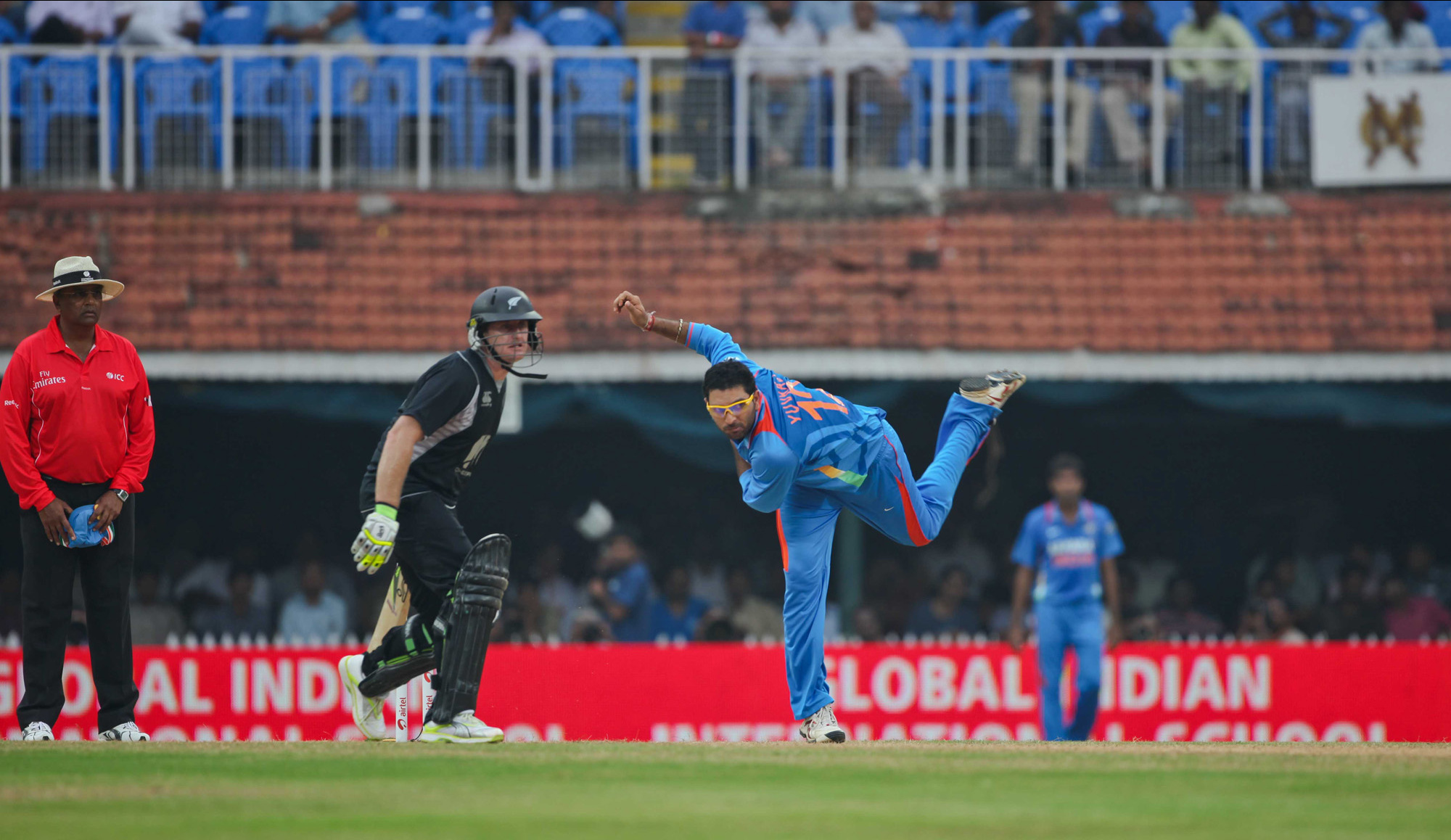
India Vs New Zealand One Day International, 10 December 2010. Cricket is hugely popular in both nations and is seen as a connection between them.

New Zealand

Bilateral relations were established between India and New Zealand in 1952. India has a High Commission in Wellington with an Honorary Consulate in Auckland, while New Zealand has a High Commission in New Delhi along with a Consulate in Mumbai, trade offices in New Delhi and Mumbai and an Honorary Consulate in Chennai.

India–New Zealand relations were cordial but not extensive after Indian independence. More recently, New Zealand has shown interest in extending ties with India due to India's impressive GDP growth.

Niue

Palau

Papua New Guinea

PM Narendra Modimeets the Governor-General of Papua New Guinea, Sir Bob Dadae, in Port Moresby on May 22, 2023.

India and Papua New Guinea established relations in 1975, following PNG's independence from Australia. Since 1975, relations have grown between the two nations. India maintains a High Commission in Port Moresby while Papua New Guinea maintains a High Commission in New Delhi. In the 2010 Fiscal Year, Trade between the two nations grew to US$239 million. PNG has sent numerous military officers and students to be trained and educated in India's academies and universities respectively. In recent years, India and PNG have signed an Economic Partnership Agreement, allowing India to further invest in PNG's infrastructure, telecommunications and educational institutions.

Samoa

Both countries established diplomatic relations in June 1970.

Solomon Islands

Tonga

Tuvalu

Vanuatu

India has its High Commission in Wellington, New Zealand, accredited to Vanuatu.

== De Facto ==
Kosovo

Since its declaration of independence from Serbia, Kosovo sought recognition from the majority of the world's most influential countries, among them India. Indian views regarding the developments followed initial consternation to comment but dismissed giving recognition of statehood. There are almost negligible interactions.

Palestine

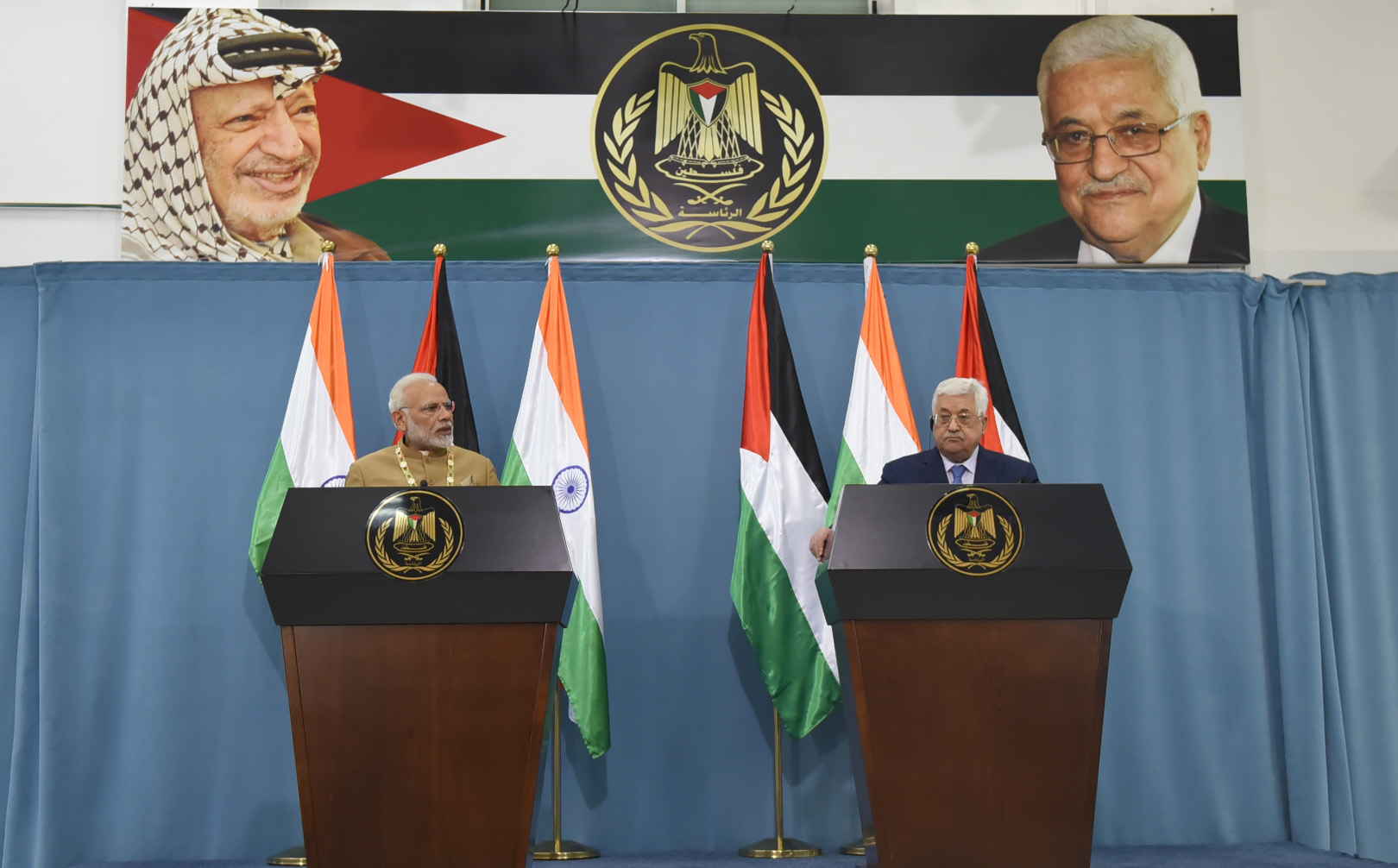
PM, Narendra Modi and the President of the State of Palestine, Mahmoud Abbas, at Ramallah, where Shree Modi received the Grand Collar of the State of Palestine, (the highest civilian honour of the State of Palestine, 2018)

After India achieved its independence in 1947, the country moved to support Palestinian self-determination following the partition of India. In light of a religious partition between India and Pakistan, the impetus to boost ties with Muslim states around the world was a further tie to India's support for the Palestinian cause. Though it started to waver in the late 1980s and 1990s, as the recognition of Israel led to diplomatic exchanges, the ultimate support for the Palestinian cause was still an underlying concern. Beyond the recognition of Palestinian self-determination, ties have been largely dependent upon socio-cultural bonds, while economic relations were neither cold nor warm.

India recognised Palestine's statehood following its declaration on 18 November 1988; although relations were first established in 1974.

PNA president Abbas paid a state visit to India in September 2012, during which India pledged $10 million as aid. Indian officials said it was the third such donation, adding that New Delhi was committed to helping other development projects. India also pledged support to Palestine's bid for full and equal membership of the UN.

Taiwan

India recognised the Republic of China (R.O.C) from 1947 to 1950. On 1 April 1950, India officially recognised the People's Republic of China (P.R.C) as "China" and continued to recognise the PRC's "One China" policy, in which the island of Taiwan is a part of Chinese territory. However, the bilateral relations between India and Taiwan have improved since the 1990s despite both nations not maintaining official diplomatic relations. Taiwan and India maintain non-governmental interaction via the India-Taipei Association and the Taipei Economic and Cultural Centre respectively. In July 2020, the Indian government appointed a top career diplomat, Joint Secretary Gourangalal Das, the former head of the US division in India's Ministry of External Affairs, as its new envoy to Taiwan.

== International organisations ==
India participates in the following international organisations:

- AALCO – Asian–African Legal Consultative Organization
- ADB – Asian Development Bank
- AfDB – African Development Bank (non-regional members)
- AG – Australia Group
- ASEAN Regional Forum
- ASEAN (dialogue partner)
- BIMSTEC – Bay of Bengal Initiative for Multi-Sectoral Technical and Economic Cooperation
- BIS – Bank for International Settlements
- BRICS – Brazil, Russia, India, China and South Africa
- Commonwealth of Nations
- CERN – European Organization for Nuclear Research
- CP – Colombo Plan
- EAS – East Asia Summit
- FAO – Food and Agriculture Organization of the United Nations
- G-4
- G-15
- G-20
- G-24
- G-77
- IAEA – International Atomic Energy Agency
- IBRD – International Bank for Reconstruction and Development (World Bank)
- ICAO – International Civil Aviation Organization
- ICC – International Chamber of Commerce
- ICRM – International Red Cross and Red Crescent Movement
- IDA – International Development Association
- IEA – International Energy Agency
- IFAD – International Fund for Agricultural Development
- IFC – International Finance Corporation
- IFRCS – International Federation of Red Cross and Red Crescent Societies
- IHO – International Hydrographic Organization
- ILO – International Labour Organization
- IMF – International Monetary Fund
- IMO – International Maritime Organization
- IMSO – International Mobile Satellite Organization
- Interpol – International Criminal Police Organization
- IOC – International Olympic Committee
- IOM – International Organization for Migration (observer)
- IORA - Indian Ocean Rim Association
- IPEEC – International Partnership for Energy Efficiency Cooperation
- IPU – Inter-Parliamentary Union
- ISA – International Solar Alliance
- ISO – International Organization for Standardization
- ITSO – International Telecommunications Satellite Organization
- ITU – International Telecommunication Union
- ITUC – International Trade Union Confederation (the successor to ICFTU (International Confederation of Free Trade Unions) and the WCL (World Confederation of Labour))
- LAS – League of Arab States (observer)
- MIGA – Multilateral Investment Guarantee Agency
- MTCR – Missile Technology Control Regime
- NAM – Non-Aligned Movement
- OAS – Organization of American States (observer)
- OPCW – Organisation for the Prohibition of Chemical Weapons
- PCA – Permanent Court of Arbitration
- PIF – Pacific Islands Forum (partner)
- SAARC – South Asian Association for Regional Cooperation
- SACEP – South Asia Co-operative Environment Programme
- SCO – Shanghai Cooperation Organisation (member)
- UN – United Nations
  - UNAIDS- United Nations Programme on HIV/AIDS
  - UNCTAD – United Nations Conference on Trade and Development
  - UNDOF – United Nations Disengagement Observer Force
  - UNESCO – United Nations Educational, Scientific and Cultural Organization
  - UNHCR – United Nations High Commissioner for Refugees
  - UNIDO – United Nations Industrial Development Organization
  - UNIFIL – United Nations Interim Force in Lebanon
  - UNMEE – United Nations Mission in Ethiopia and Eritrea
  - UNMIS – United Nations Mission in Sudan
  - UNOCI – United Nations Operation in Côte d'Ivoire
  - MONUSCO – United Nations Organization Mission in the Democratic Republic of the Congo
- UNWTO – World Tourism Organization
- UPU – Universal Postal Union
- WA – Wassenaar Arrangement
- WCL – World Confederation of Labour
- WCO – World Customs Organization
- WFTU – World Federation of Trade Unions
- WHO – World Health Organization
- WIPO – World Intellectual Property Organization
- WMO – World Meteorological Organization
- WTO – World Trade Organization

=== Commonwealth of Nations ===
India became independent within the British Commonwealth in August 1947 as the Dominion of India after the partition of India into India and the Dominion of Pakistan. King George VI, the last Emperor of India, became the King of India with the Governor-General of India as his viceregal representative.

India became the very first Commonwealth republic on 26 January 1950, as a result of the London Declaration. Staying in the Commonwealth allowed India to maintain contact with the Indian diaspora, much of which was by then dispersed among the former British colonies. It also was arguably meant to avoid an overly strong Pakistan–United Kingdom relationship.

Non-Aligned Movement

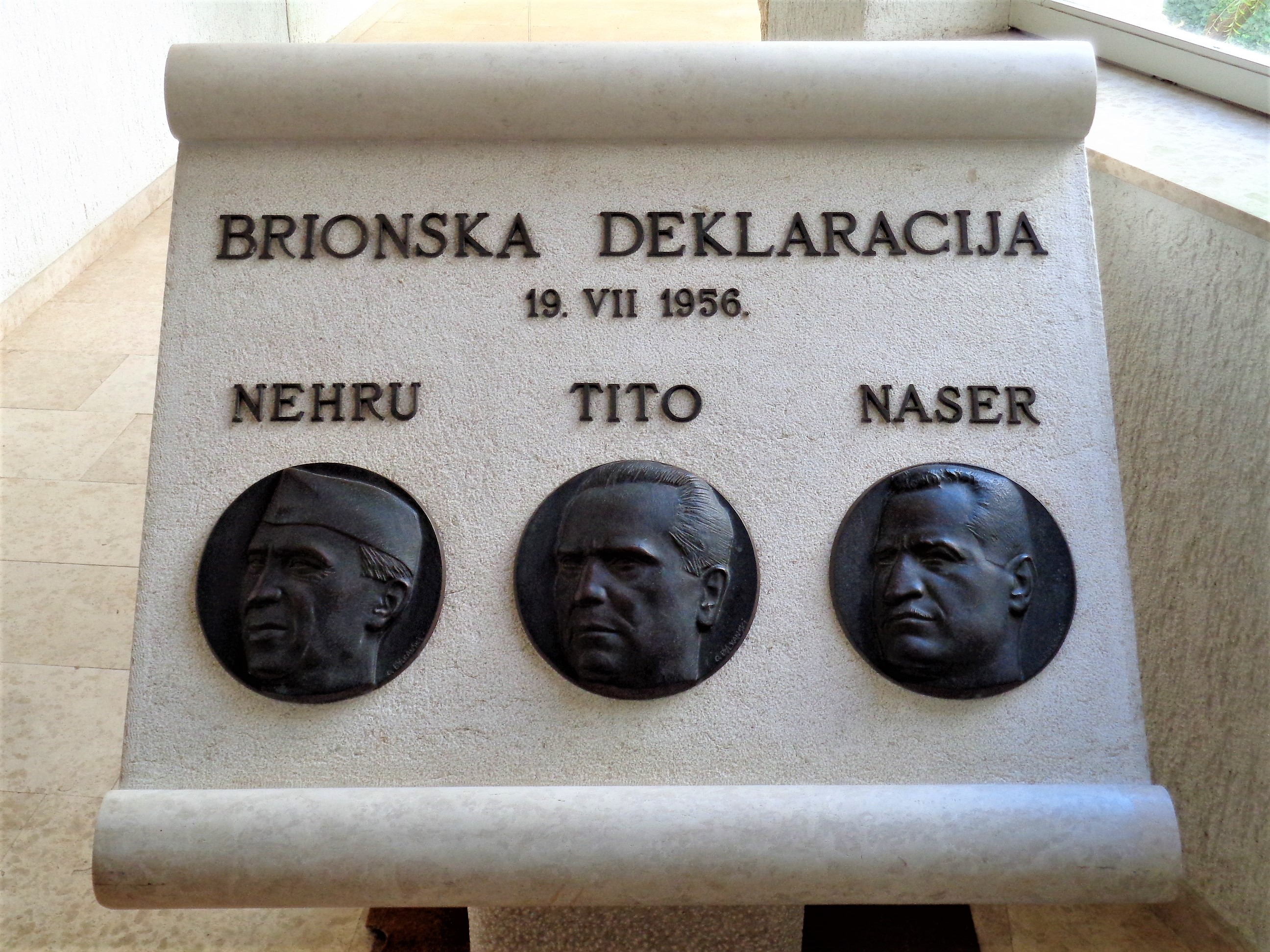
Memorial stone plaque dedicated to the Brijuni Declaration of the Non-Aligned Movement, signed on 19 July 1956, exhibited in the Brijuni Museums, Republic of Croatia

India played an important role in the multilateral movements of colonies and newly independent countries that developed into the Non-Aligned Movement. Nonalignment had its origins in India's colonial experience and the nonviolent Indian independence movement led by the Congress, which left India determined to be the master of its fate in an international system dominated politically by Cold War alliances and economically by Western capitalism and Soviet communism. The principles of nonalignment, as articulated by Nehru and his successors, were the preservation of India's freedom of action internationally through refusal to align India with any bloc or alliance, particularly those led by the United States or the Soviet Union; nonviolence and international cooperation as a means of settling international disputes. Nonalignment was a consistent feature of Indian foreign policy by the late 1940s and enjoyed strong, almost unquestioning support among the Indian elite.

The term "Non-Alignment" was coined by V K Menon in his speech at the UN in 1953, which was later used by Indian prime minister Jawaharlal Nehru during his speech in 1954 in Colombo, Sri Lanka. In this speech, Nehru described the five pillars to be used as a guide for China–India relations, which were first put forth by Chinese Premier Zhou Enlai. Called Panchsheel (five restraints), these principles would later serve as the basis of the Non-Aligned Movement. The five principles were:

1. Mutual respect for territorial integrity and sovereignty
2. Mutual non-aggression
3. Mutual non-interference in domestic affairs
4. Equality and mutual benefit
5. Peaceful co-existence

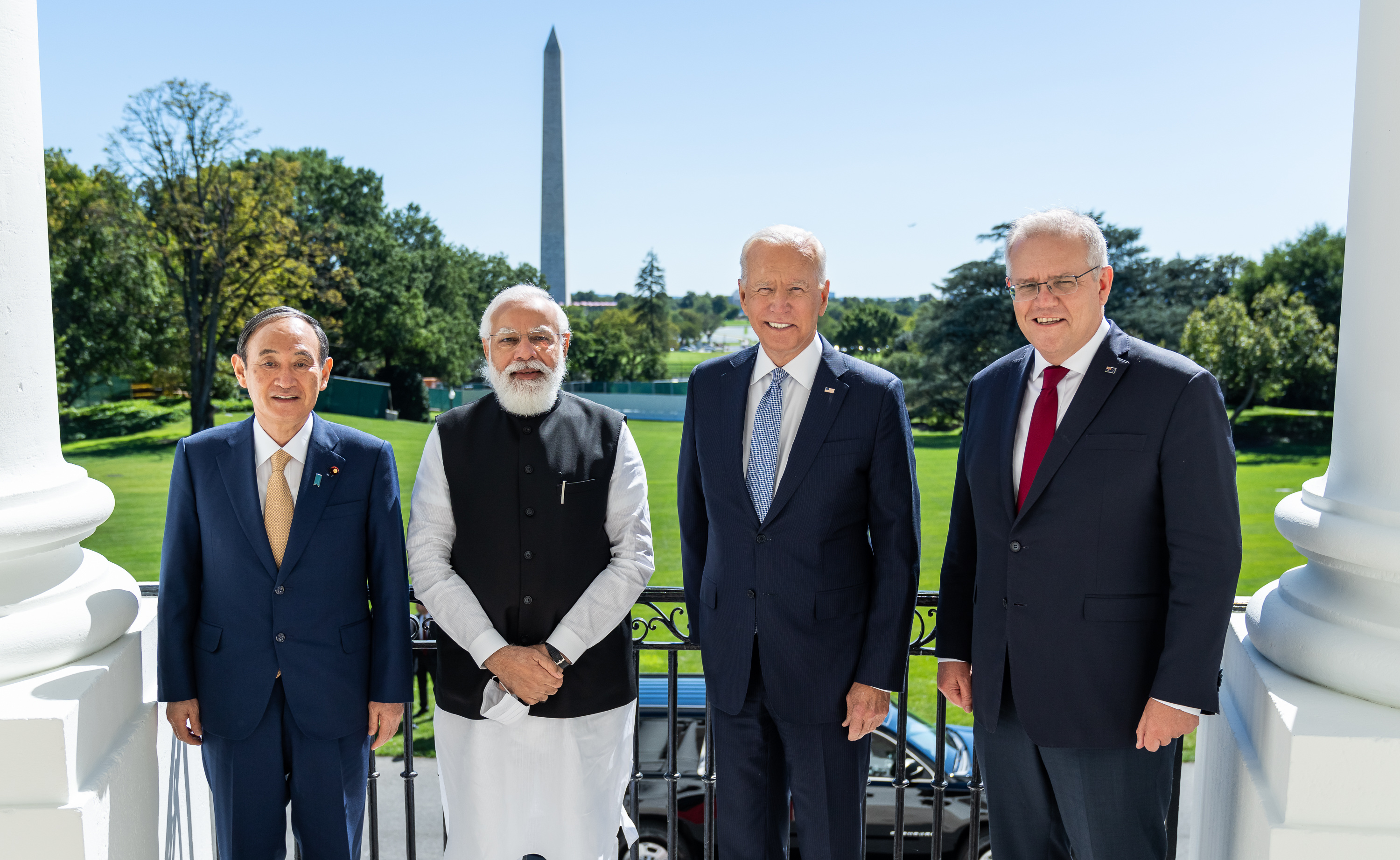
From left to right: Prime Minister of Japan Yoshihide Suga, Prime Minister of India Narendra Modi, President of United States Joe Biden and Prime Minister of Australia Scott Morrison in White House, USA.

Jawaharlal Nehru's concept of nonalignment brought India considerable international prestige among newly independent states that shared India's concerns about the military confrontation between the superpowers and the influence of the former colonial powers. New Delhi used nonalignment to establish a significant role for itself as a leader of the newly independent world in such multilateral organisations as the United Nations (UN) and the Nonaligned Movement. The signing of the Treaty of Peace, Friendship, and Cooperation between India and the Soviet Union in 1971 and India's involvement in the internal affairs of its smaller neighbours in the 1970s and 1980s tarnished New Delhi's image as a nonaligned nation and led some observers to note that in practice, nonalignment applied only to India's relations with countries outside South Asia.

Quad Alliance

The Quadrilateral Security Dialogue (QSD, also known as the Quad) is an informal strategic dialogue between the United States, India, Japan and Australia that is maintained by talks between member countries. The dialogue was initiated in 2007 by Japanese prime minister Shinzo Abe, with the support of American vice-president Dick Cheney, Australian prime minister John Howard and former Indian prime minister Manmohan Singh. The dialogue was paralleled by joint military exercises of an unprecedented scale, titled Exercise Malabar. The diplomatic and military arrangement was widely viewed as a response to increased Chinese economic and military power. On 12 March 2021, the first summit meeting was held virtually between U.S President Joe Biden, Indian prime minister Narendra Modi, Japanese prime minister Yoshihide Suga and Australian prime minister Scott Morrison.

United Nations

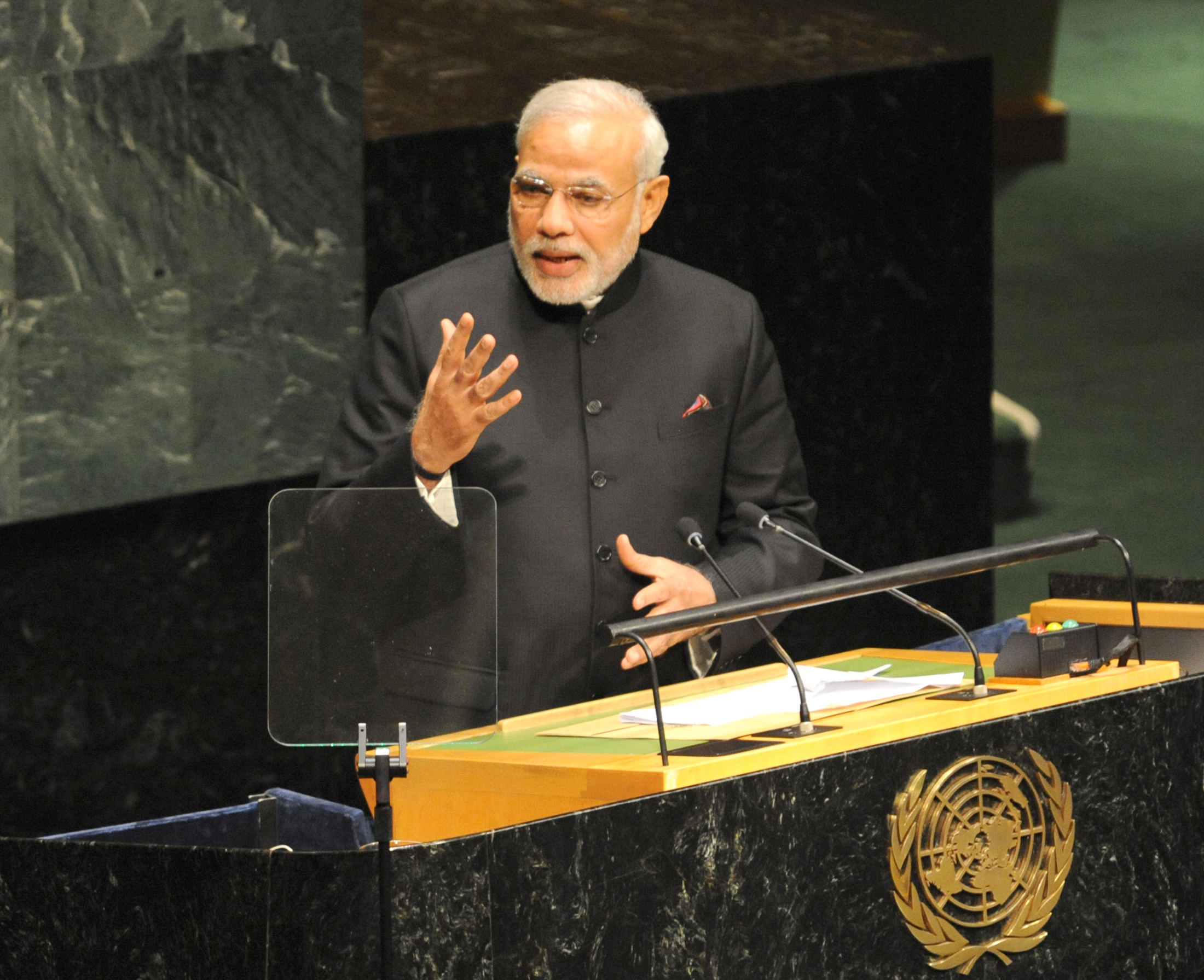
Narendra Modi, The current Prime Minister of India, addressing the 69th UNGA, in 2014

India was among the original members of the United Nations that signed the Declaration by United Nations at Washington on 1 January 1942 and also participated in the United Nations Conference on International Organization in San Francisco from 25 April to 26 June 1945. As a founding member of the United Nations, India strongly supports the purposes and principles of the UN and has made significant contributions to implementing the goals of the Charter and the evolution of the UN's specialised programmes and agencies. India is a charter member of the United Nations and participates in all of its specialised agencies and organisations. India has contributed troops to United Nations peacekeeping efforts in Korea, Egypt and the Congo in its earlier years and in Somalia, Angola, Haiti, Liberia, Lebanon and Rwanda in recent years, and more recently in the South Sudan conflict. India has been a member of the UN Security Council for eight terms (a total of 16 years). India is a member of the G4 group of nations who back each other in seeking a permanent seat on the security council and advocate in favour of the reformation of the UNSC. India is also part of the Group of 77.

World Trade Organization

Described by the WTO's former chief, Pascal Lamy, as one of the organisation's "big brothers", India was instrumental in bringing down the Doha Development Round of talks in 2008. It has played an important role in representing as many as 100 developing nations during WTO summits.

== Former ==
Soviet Union

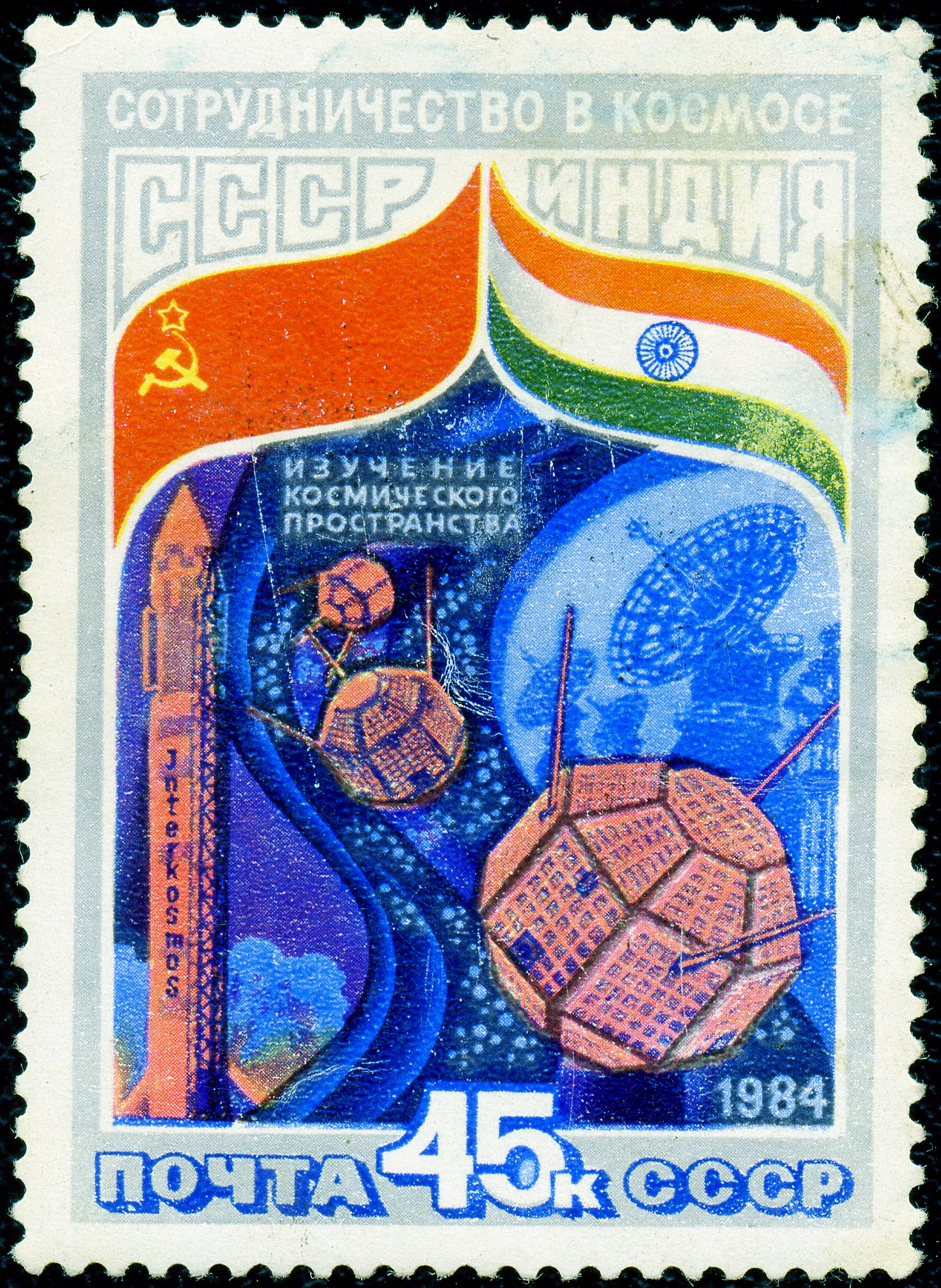
Soviet Stamp celebrating Indo-Soviet friendship & Cooperation

The dissolution of the Soviet Union and the emergence of the Commonwealth of Independent States (CIS) had major repercussions for Indian foreign policy. Substantial trade with the former Soviet Union plummeted after the Soviet collapse and has yet to recover. Longstanding military supply relationships were similarly disrupted due to questions over financing, although Russia continues to be India's largest supplier of military systems and spare parts.

The relationship with the USSR was tested (and proven) during the 1971 war with Pakistan, which led to the subsequent liberation of Bangladesh. Soon after the victory of the Indian Armed Forces, one of the foreign delegates to visit India was Admiral S.G. Gorshkov, Chief of the Soviet Navy. During his visit to Mumbai (Bombay), he came on board INS Vikrant. During a conversation with Vice Admiral Swaraj Prakash, Gorshkov asked the Vice Admiral, "Were you worried about a battle against the American carrier?" He answered himself: "Well, you had no reason to be worried, as I had a Soviet nuclear submarine trailing the American task force all the way into the Indian Ocean."

Yugoslavia

India had formal relations with the Socialist Federal Republic of Yugoslavia until 1992 with the Breakup of Yugoslavia.

== Border disputes ==
India's territorial disputes with neighbouring Pakistan and the People's Republic of China have played a crucial role in its foreign policy. India is also involved in minor territorial disputes with neighbouring Bangladesh, Nepal and Maldives. India currently maintains two staffed stations in Antarctica but has made some unofficial territorial claims, which are yet to be clarified.

India is involved in the following border disputes:

Nepal

Kalapani village of India is claimed by Nepal and Susta village in Nawalparasi district of Nepal is claimed by India. The dispute between India and Nepal involves about 75 km^{2} (30 sq mi) of area in Kalapani, where China, India, and Nepal meet. Indian forces occupied the area in 1962 after China and India fought their border war. Three villages are located in the disputed zone: Kuti [Kuthi, 30°19'N, 80°46'E], Gunji, and Knabe. India and Nepal disagree about how to interpret the 1816 Sugauli treaty between the British East India Company and Nepal, which delimited the boundary along the Maha Kali River (Sarda River in India). The dispute intensified in 1997 as the Nepali parliament considered a treaty on the hydroelectric development of the river. India and Nepal differ as to which stream constitutes the source of the river. Nepal regards the Limpiyadhura as the source; India claims the Lipu Lekh. Nepal has reportedly tabled an 1856 map from the British India Office to support its position. The countries have held several meetings about the dispute and discussed jointly surveying to resolve the issue. Although the Indo-Nepali dispute appears to be minor, it was aggravated in 1962 by tensions between China and India. Because the disputed area lies near the Sino-Indian frontier, it gains strategic value.

Pakistan

Indus and tributaries

- The unresolved Kashmir conflict and the status of Kashmir with India: Pakistan claims that it is a disputed territory with India; meanwhile, Pakistan claims its side of the disputed territory and calls it "Azad Kashmir".
- Dispute over Sir Creek and the maritime boundary regarding the Rann of Kachchh area of the southern tip of Sindh.
- Water-sharing problems with Pakistan over the Indus River (Wular Barrage). (Indus Waters Treaty)

China

- India claims Aksai Chin and Trans-Karakoram Tract, as part of Ladakh.
- China claims most of Arunachal Pradesh, a contested disputed territory of north-east India by not recognising the McMahon Line.

Two regions are claimed by both India and China. Aksai Chin is in the disputed territory of Ladakh, at the junction of India, Tibet and Xinjiang. India claims the 38,000-square-kilometre territory, currently administered by China after the Sino-Indian War. India also considers the cession of Shaksam Valley to China by Pakistan as illegal and a part of its territory. Arunachal Pradesh is a state of India in the country's northeast, bordering on Bhutan, Burma and China's Tibet, though it has been under Indian administration since the 1914, China claims the 90,000-square-kilometre area as South Tibet. Also, the boundary between the North Indian states of Himachal Pradesh and Uttarakhand with China's Tibet is not properly demarcated, with some portions under the de facto administration of India.

== Diplomatic relations with India through philately ==
List of countries commemorating anniversaries of diplomatic relations with India through philately

Year	Country	Anniversary Milestone	Type	Sub type	Image	Date of issue
1972	Soviet Union	25th Anniversary	Postal Stationery	Unilateral Issue		1972
2000	China	50th Anniversary	Postal Stationery	Unilateral Issue		1 Apr
2002	Japan	50th Anniversary	Stamp	Unilateral Issue		26 Apr
2003	South Korea	30th Anniversary	Stamp	Joint Issue	•	10 Dec
2003	South Africa	10th Anniversary	Stamp	Unilateral Issue		16 Oct
2004	Bulgaria	50th Anniversary of Diplomatic Relations	Postal Stationary	Unilateral Issue		2004
2005	China	55th Anniversary of Diplomatic Relations	Postmark	Unilateral Issue		29 Apr
2007	Japan	Japan - India Friendship	Stamp	Unilateral Issue		23 May
2008	Ethiopia	60th Anniversary	Stamp	Unilateral Issue		30 Dec
2009	Philippines	60th Anniversary	Stamp	Joint Issue		16 Nov
2010	Cuba	50th Anniversary	Stamp	Unilateral Issue		10 Feb
2012	Israel	20th Anniversary	Stamp	Joint Issue		5 Nov
2012	Germany	60th Anniversary	Postmark	Unilateral Issue		6 Dec
2013	Russia	60th Anniversary	Postal Stationery	Unilateral Issue		2013
2013	Peru	50th Anniversary	Stamp	Unilateral Issue		19 Mar
2013	Kazakhstan	20th Anniversary	Stamp	Unilateral Issue		2 Jul
2014	Bulgaria	60th Anniversary	Postal Stationery	Unilateral Issue		2014
2014	Nepal	Nepal India Friendship	Postmark	Unilateral Issue		3 Aug
2014	Myanmar	The Five Principles of Peaceful Co-existence by Myanmar, China & India	Stamp + Postal Stationery	Unilateral Issue		2014
2016	Oman	60th Anniversary	Stamp	Unilateral Issue		5 Apr
2017	Moldova	25th Anniversary	Postal Stationery	Unilateral Issue		2017
2017	Russia	70th Anniversary	Postal Stationery	Unilateral Issue		2017
2017	Belarus	25th Anniversary	Stamp	Joint Issue		12 Sep
2018	Brazil	70th Anniversary	Stamp	Unilateral Issue		2 Oct
2018	Bhutan	50th Anniversary	Stamp	Unilateral Issue		21 Feb
2018	Georgia	25th Anniversary	Stamp	Unilateral Issue		14 Jun
2018	Mauritius	50th Anniversary	Stamp	Unilateral Issue		18 Aug
2018	Serbia	70th Anniversary	Stamp	Joint Issue		15 Sep
2019	Indonesia	70th Anniversary	Stamp (Personalized)	Unilateral Issue		2019
2019	Colombia	60th Anniversary	Stamp	Unilateral Issue		28 Jan
2019	Afghanistan	Friendship	Stamps	Unilateral Issue		2019
2020	China	70th Anniversary	Postal Stationery	Unilateral Issue		1 Apr
2020	Cuba	60th Anniversary of Diplomatic Relations	Postmark	Unilateral Issue		16 Nov
2020	Mongolia	65th Anniversary	Stamp	Unilateral Issue		24 Dec
2021	Bangladesh	50th Anniversary	Stamp	Joint Issue		27 Mar
2021	Germany	70th Anniversary	Stamp	Joint Issue		10 Jun
2021	Senegal	60th Anniversary	Stamp	Unilateral Issue		5 Nov
2021	Tajikistan	75th Anniversary of India's Independence	Stamp	Unilateral Issue		16 Sep
2022	Iraq	Iraqi - India relations	Stamp	Unilateral Issue		17 Feb
2022	Cuba	75th Anniversary of India's Independence	Postmark	Unilateral Issue		27 Jun
2022	United Arab Emirates	75th Anniversary of India's Independence	Stamp	Joint Issue		30 Jun
2022	Belarus	30th Anniversary	Postal Stationery	Unilateral Issue		3 Aug
2022	Egypt	75th Anniversary of India's Independence	Stamp	Unilateral Issue		18 Aug
2022	Peru	75th Anniversary of India's Independence	Stamp	Unilateral Issue		26 Aug
2022	Andorra	75th Anniversary of India's Independence	Stamp	Unilateral Issue		3 Oct
2022	Moldova	75th Anniversary of India's Independence	Postmark	Unilateral Issue		7 Oct
2022	Serbia	75th Anniversary of India's Independence	Postmark	Unilateral Issue		29 Nov
2022	Cyprus	75th Anniversary of India's Independence	Stamp (Personalized)	Unilateral Issue		29 Dec
2023	Kyrgyzstan	30th Anniversary of Diplomatic Relations	Stamp	Unilateral Issue		30 Jan
2023	Kyrgyzstan	30th Anniversary of Diplomatic Relations	Stamp - Kyrgyz Express Post	Unilateral Issue		30 Jan
2023	Luxembourg	75 Years of Friendship Between Luxembourg and India	Miniature Sheet	Joint Issue		15 Mar
2023	Uzbekistan	75 Years of India's Independence	Miniature Sheet	Unliateral Issue		7 Aug
2023	Vietnam	50th Anniversary of Diplomatic Relations	Stamps	Joint Issue		16 Oct
2023	Mauritius	75th Anniversary of Diplomatic Relations	Stamps	Joint Issue		2 Nov
2023	Sri Lanka	100 years of Establishment of the Assistant High Commission of India in Kandy	Stamp (Personalized)	Unilateral Issue		7 Dec
2023	Oman	Celebrating Friendship	Miniature Sheet & Stamps	Joint Issue		15 Dec
2024	Romania	75th Anniversary of Diplomatic Relations	Stamps	Joint Issue		17 Sep
2024	Peru	60 years of Diplomatic Relations	Postmark	Unliateral Issue		14 Dec
2025	Portugal	50th Anniversary of Re-establishment of Diplomatic Relations	Miniature Sheet	Joint Issue		7 Apr
2025	Maldives	60 years of Diplomatic Relations	Miniature Sheet	Joint Issue		25 Jul
2025	Philippines	75th Anniversary of Diplomatic Relations	Miniature Sheet	Joint Issue		5 Aug
2025	Mongolia	75th Anniversary of Diplomatic Relations	Miniature Sheet	Joint Issue		14 Oct
2026	Laos	70th Anniversary of Diplomatic Relations	Miniature Sheet & Stamp	Unilateral Issue		20 Mar

[top]

== See also ==
- India and the United Nations
- India and the Non-Aligned Movement
- Cold War in Asia#India, 1947–1991
- List of diplomatic missions in India
- List of diplomatic missions of India
- List of diplomatic visits to India
- List of Republic of India extradition treaties
- Research and Analysis Wing
- Visa policy of India
- Visa requirements for Indian citizens
